= 2014 Renfrew County municipal elections =

Local election in Ontario, Canada

Elections were held in Renfrew County, Ontario on October 27, 2014 in conjunction with municipal elections across the province.

== Renfrew County Council ==
County council has no direct elections; its membership is made up of the mayors and reeves of the lower-tier municipalities of the county, including the reeves (not the mayors) or Arnprior, Deep River, Laurentian Valley, Renfrew and Whitewater Region. Therefore, elections in those municipalities determine the members of council for the new term.

Position	Elected
Mayor of Admaston Bromley	Michael Donohue
Reeve of Arnprior	Walter Stack (acclaimed)
Mayor of Bonnechere Valley	Jennifer Murphy
Reeve of Brudenell, Lyndoch and Raglan	Garry Gruntz
Reeve of Deep River	Glenn Doncaster (acclaimed)
Mayor of Greater Madawaska	Glenda McKay
Reeve of Head, Clara and Maria	Jim Gibson
Mayor of Horton	Bob Kingsbury
Mayor of Killaloe, Hagarty and Richards	Janice Visneskie Moore
Mayor of Laurentian Hills	John Reinwald
Reeve of Laurentian Valley	Debbie Robinson (acclaimed)
Mayor of Madawaska Valley	Kim Love
Mayor of McNab/Braeside	Tom Peckett
Mayor of North Algona Wilberforce	Deborah Farr
Mayor of Petawawa	Robert Sweet (acclaimed)
Reeve of Renfrew	Peter Emon
Reeve of Whitewater Region	Terry Millar

== Admaston Bromley ==
Mayoral Candidate	Vote	%
Michael Donohue	565	48.41
Raye-Anne Briscoe (X)	351	30.08
Jack Patrick Kelly	251	21.51

== Arnprior ==
Mayoral Candidate	Vote	%
David Reid (X)	Acclaimed	

== Bonnechere Valley ==
Mayoral Candidate	Vote	%
Jennifer Murphy (X)	1,827	84.86
Kipston Smith	326	15.14

== Brudenell, Lyndoch and Raglan ==
Reeve Candidate	Vote	%
Garry Gruntz	618	49.36
Michael McCloskey	335	26.76
Norman Lentz (X)	299	23.88

== Deep River ==
Mayoral Candidate	Vote	%
Joan Lougheed	1,787	84.09
David Thompson (X)	338	15.91

== Greater Madawaska ==
Mayoral Candidate	Vote	%
Glenda McKay	1,432	66.79
John Pratt	712	33.21

== Head, Clara and Maria ==
Reeve Candidate	Vote	%
Jim Gibson	148	56.49
Tammy Stewart (X)	114	43.51

== Horton ==
Mayoral Candidate	Vote	%
Bob Kingsbury	649	42.75
Margaret Whyte	478	31.49
Angela Burgess	391	25.76

== Killaloe, Hagarty and Richards ==
Mayoral Candidate	Vote	%
Janice Visneskie Moore (X)	808	39.55
Linda Gavin	662	32.40
Isabel O'Reilly	573	28.05

== Laurentian Hills ==
Mayoral Candidate	Vote	%
John Reinwald	512	54.64
Dick Rabishaw (X)	425	45.36

== Laurentian Valley ==
Mayoral Candidate	Vote	%
Steve Bennett	Acclaimed	

== Madawaska Valley ==
Mayoral Candidate	Vote	%
Kim Love	2,218	62.85
David Shulist (X)	1,311	37.15

== McNab/Braeside ==
Mayoral Candidate	Vote	%
Tom Peckett	1,476	45.43
Aldene Styles	1,112	34.23
Mary Campbell (X)	661	20.34

== North Algona-Wilberforce ==
Mayoral Candidate	Vote	%
Deborah Farr	945	45.70
Harold Weckworth (X)	655	31.67
Kevin Clarke	299	14.46
John R. Keuhl	169	8.17

== Petawawa ==
Petawawa had the lowest turnout out of all municipalities in Ontario, where the councils were not acclaimed. Only 15.81% of voters bothered to cast ballots.

Mayoral Candidate	Vote	%
Robert Sweet (X)	Acclaimed	

== Renfrew ==
Mayoral Candidate	Vote	%
Don Eady	1,282	38.08
Tom Anderson	927	27.53
James Miller	732	21.74
W. R. Callum Scott	426	12.65

== Whitewater Region ==
Mayoral Candidate	Vote	%
Hal Johnson	964	30.26
Joey Trimm	927	29.10
Jim Labow (X)	785	24.64
Doug Shields	510	16.01
