= 2018 Renfrew County municipal elections =

Local election in Ontario, Canada

Elections were held in Renfrew County, Ontario on October 22, 2018 in conjunction with municipal elections across the province.

== Renfrew County Council ==
County council has no direct elections; its membership is made up of the mayors and reeves of the lower-tier municipalities of the county (including the reeves - rather than mayors - of Deep River, Laurentian Valley, Renfrew and Whitewater Region), while Arnpror elects a separate councillor for county council. Therefore, elections in those municipalities determine the members of council for the new term.

Position	Elected
Mayor of Admaston Bromley	Michael Donohue (acclaimed)
Arnprior County Councillor	Dan Lynch (acclaimed)
Mayor of Bonnechere Valley	Jennifer Murphy (acclaimed)
Mayor of Brudenell, Lyndoch and Raglan	Sheldon Keller
Reeve of Deep River	Suzanne D'Eon
Mayor of Greater Madawaska	Brian Hunt
Mayor of Head, Clara and Maria	Debbi Grills
Mayor of Horton	David M. Bennett
Mayor of Killaloe, Hagarty and Richards	Janice Visneskie Moore
Mayor of Laurentian Hills	John Reinwald
Reeve of Laurentian Valley	Debbie Robinson (acclaimed)
Mayor of Madawaska Valley	Steve Bennett
Mayor of McNab/Braeside	Thomas Peckett
Mayor of North Algona Wilberforce	James Brose
Mayor of Petawawa	Robert Sweet
Reeve of Renfrew	Peter Emon (acclaimed)
Reeve of Whitewater Region	Michael Moore

== Admaston Bromley ==
Mayoral Candidate	Vote	%
Michael Donohue (X)	Acclaimed	

== Arnprior ==
Mayoral Candidate	Vote	%
Walter Stack	1,921	66.06
Gabriel Flowers	987	33.94

== Bonnechere Valley ==
Mayoral Candidate	Vote	%
Jennifer Murphy (X)	Acclaimed	

== Brudenell, Lyndoch and Raglan ==
Mayoral Candidate	Vote	%
Sheldon Keller (X)	694	66.28
Michael John McCloskey	353	33.72

== Deep River ==
Mayoral Candidate	Vote	%
Suzanne D'Eon	1,368	67.09
Larry Dumoulin	398	19.52
Anne Hutton	259	12.70
Benjamin Kolaczek	14	0.69

== Greater Madawaska ==
Mayoral Candidate	Vote	%
Brian Hunt	945	49.95
Lois Thomson	561	29.65
Glenda McKay (X)	386	20.40

== Head, Clara and Maria ==
Mayoral Candidate	Vote	%
Debbi Grills	227	74.92
Robert Reid (X)	76	25.08

== Horton ==
Mayoral Candidate	Vote	%
David M. Bennett	794	54.9
Robert Kingsbury (X)	652	45.1

== Killaloe, Hagarty and Richards ==
Mayoral Candidate	Vote	%
Janice Visneskie Moore (X)	951	52.25
David Mayville	869	47.75

== Laurentian Hills ==
Mayoral Candidate	Vote	%
John Reinwald (X)	562	73.66
Dick Rabishaw	201	26.34

== Laurentian Valley ==
Mayoral Candidate	Vote	%
Steve Bennett (X)	2,219	64.94
Danny Janke	1,198	35.06

== Madawaska Valley ==
Mayoral Candidate	Vote	%
Kim Love (X)	1,617	51.94
Elser Lee Faith Archer	1,125	36.14
Andrey Kaminski	371	11.92

== McNab/Braeside ==
Mayoral Candidate	Vote	%
Thomas Peckett (X)	1,446	56.05
Lou Laventure	1,134	43.95

== North Algona Wilberforce ==
Mayoral Candidate	Vote	%
James Brose	668	36.30
Nora Shay	475	25.82
John Kuehl	458	24.89
Deborah Farr (X)	239	12.99

== Petawawa ==
Mayoral Candidate	Vote	%
Robert Sweet (X)	2,257	60.32
Dan Criger	1,485	39.68

== Renfrew ==
Mayoral Candidate	Vote	%
Don Eady (X)	2,117	75.45
Callum Scott	689	24.55

== Whitewater Region ==
Mayoral Candidate	Vote	%
Michael Moore	1,637	54.17
Hal Johnson (X)	1,385	45.83
