= Malotte Lake =

Lake in Renfrew County, Ontario, Canada

- lac Malotte
- Location in Southern Ontario
- Location: Renfrew County, Ontario
- Coordinates: 45°19′32″N 76°58′36″W
- Part of: Saint Lawrence River drainage basin
- Primary outflows: Malotte Creek
- Basin countries: Canada
- Max. length: 460 m (1,510 ft)
- Max. width: 120 m (390 ft)
- Surface elevation: 362 m (1,188 ft)

Malotte Lake (French: lac Malotte) is a lake in Greater Madawaska, Renfrew County in Eastern Ontario, Canada. It is in the Saint Lawrence River drainage basin and is the source of Malotte Creek.

The lake has two unnamed inflows: one at the northwest, and one at the southeast. The primary outflow is Malotte Creek at the southwest. It flows via Black Donald Creek, Black Donald Lake, the Madawaska River, and the Ottawa River to the Saint Lawrence River.

== See also ==
- List of lakes in Ontario
