= Centennial Lake Provincial Nature Reserve =

Provincial park in Ontario, Canada

- IUCN category Ia (strict nature reserve)
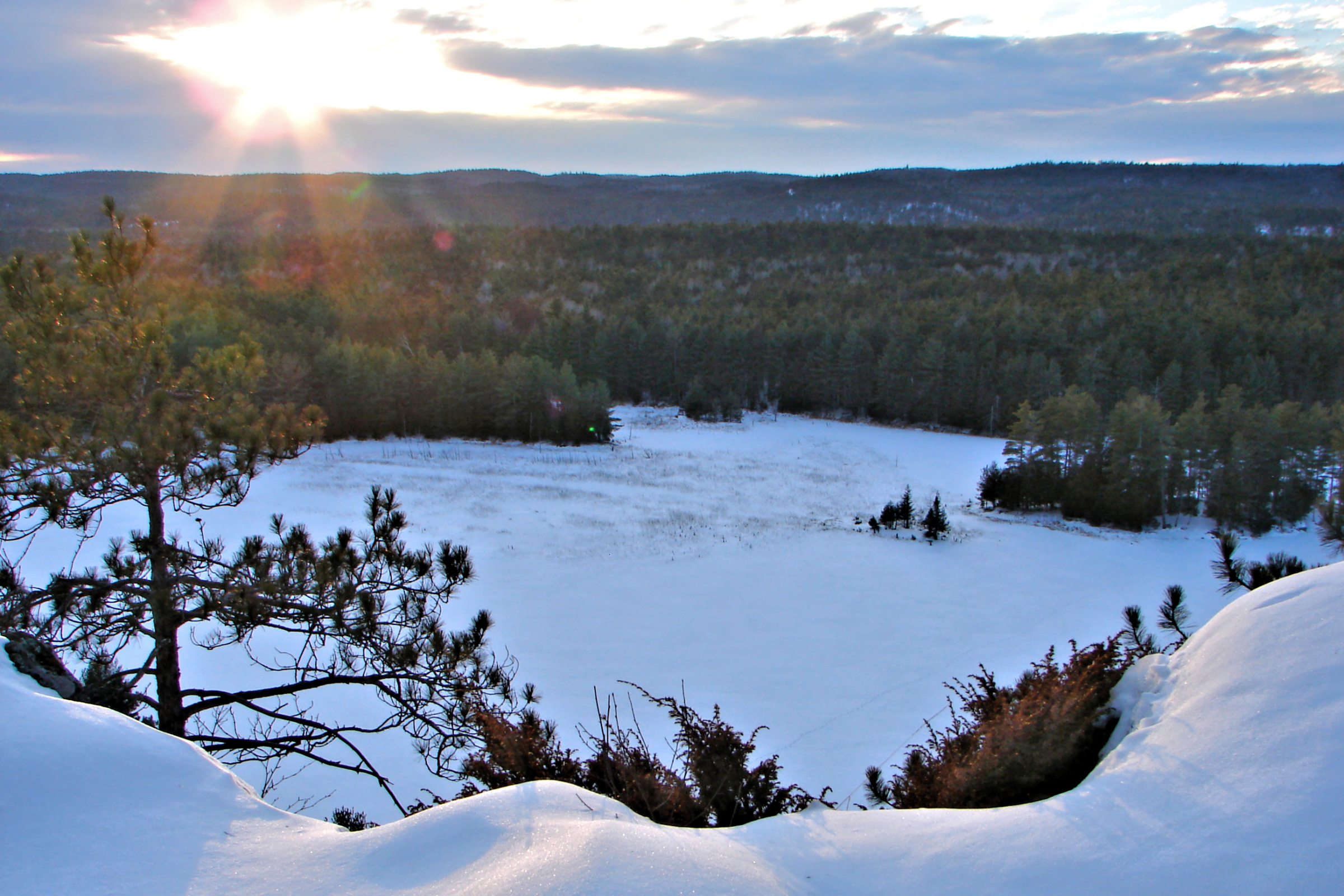
- Oakhill Lake

- Location within Southern Ontario
- Location: Greater Madawaska, Ontario, Canada
- Coordinates: 45°14′08″N 76°59′27″W
- Area: 530 ha (1,300 acres)
- Created: 1989
- Operator: Ontario Parks
- Website: www.ontarioparks.com/park/centenniallake

The Centennial Lake Provincial Nature Reserve (also known as Centennial Lake Provincial Park) is a provincial park located in the municipality of Greater Madawaska, Renfrew County, in Eastern Ontario, Canada. The 530-hectare (1,300-acre) reserve was created in 1989 and is managed by Ontario Parks.

The park consists of 5 non-contiguous parts. The majority of the park is a section of land north of Black Donald Lake surrounding Oakhill Lake and bordered on the east by the Black Donald Creek; another part is the largest island in Black Donald Lake, and the remaining 3 parts are portions of three smaller islets in the same lake.

The park protects unusual geological features and many rare plant species, including the Purple cliffbrake (Pellaea atropurpurea). It is a non-operating park, meaning there are no facilities or services.

== Fauna ==
Bird species spotted in the reserve include:

- Bald eagle (Haliaeetus leucocephalus)
- Black-capped chickadee (Poecile atricapillus)
- Blue jay (Cyanocitta cristata)
- Common raven (Corvus corax)
- Downy woodpecker (Dryobates pubescens)
- Hairy woodpecker (Dryobates villosus)
- Trumpeter swan (Cygnus buccinator)
- White-breasted nuthatch (Sitta carolinensis)
- Wild turkey (Meleagris gallopavo)

== See also ==
- Centennial Lake (Renfrew County) - nearby namesake lake
