= Tooeys Lake =

Lake in Renfrew County, Ontario, Canada

- lac Tooeys
- Location in Southern Ontario
- Location: Renfrew County, Ontario
- Coordinates: 45°20′34″N 77°01′35″W
- Part of: Saint Lawrence River drainage basin
- Primary outflows: Tooeys Creek
- Basin countries: Canada
- Max. length: 490 m (1,610 ft)
- Max. width: 140 m (460 ft)
- Surface elevation: 329 m (1,079 ft)

Tooeys Lake (French: lac Tooeys) is a lake in Greater Madawaska, Renfrew County in Eastern Ontario, Canada. It is in the Saint Lawrence River drainage basin and is the source of Tooeys Creek.

The lake has three unnamed inflows: one at the northwest, a second at the northeast, and a third at the east. The primary outflow is Tooeys Creek at the southeast, the site of a rest area adjacent to Ontario Highway 41. Tooeys Creek flows via Black Donald Creek, Black Donald Lake, the Madawaska River, and the Ottawa River to the Saint Lawrence River.

== See also ==
- List of lakes in Ontario
