= Tuohey =

Tuohey is an Irish surname and may refer to

- Adrian Tuohey (born 1993), Irish hurler
- Alan Tuohey (1918–1985), Australian rugby player
- Mark Tuohey, American attorney

== See also ==
- Toohey (disambiguation)
- Tuohy, a surname
