= List of numbered roads in Renfrew County =

List of county roads

This is a list of numbered county roads in Renfrew County, Ontario, Canada.

Number	Local Name(s)	Western/Southern Terminus	Eastern/Northern Terminus	Major Communities	Comments
Renfrew County Road 1	Madawaska Boulevard; Madawaska Street; Elgin Street West; River Road	County Road 4	City of Ottawa Road 117 (Madawaska Boulevard)	Arnprior, Braeside, Sand Point	Historical route of Highway 17
Renfrew County Road 2	Daniel Street; White Lake Road	County Road 52	County Road 1	Arnprior, White Lake	
Renfrew County Road 3	Usborne Street	County Road 54	County Road 1	Braeside	Usborne Street continues east of River Road
Renfrew County Road 4	Storyland Road; Queen's Line	County Road 7	Highway 17	Chenaux	
Renfrew County Road 5	Stone Road	Highway 60	Highway 132	Douglas	
Renfrew County Road 6	Lochwinnoch Road; Gillan Road	Highway 60	County Road 63	Renfrew	
Renfrew County Road 7	Foresters Falls Road	Highway 17	Kohlsmith Road	Foresters Falls	
Renfrew County Road 8	Cobden Road; Main Street	Highway 60	Highway 17	Cobden	
Renfrew County Road 9	Bulger Road	Highway 41	Highway 60	Lake Dore	
Renfrew County Road 10	Point Church Drive; Letts Cemetery Road	Highway 41	Highway 60	Lake Dore	Replaced (in part) by Highway 134 (precursor to Highway 41)
Renfrew County Road 10	Division Street; Baskin Drive W	Cty Rd 1/Elgin Street W	Cty Rd 2/Daniel Street S	Arnprior	
Renfrew County Road 12	Westmeath Road	County Road 21	County Road 50	Westmeath	
Renfrew County Road 13	Mountain Road	Highway 41	Highway 17	Micksburg	
Renfrew County Road 14	Witt Road	County Road 26	County Road 56	Alice Township	Witt Road continues east to Highway 41
Renfrew County Road 15	Division Street	Highway 417	County Road 1	Arnprior	
Renfrew County Road 16	Victoria Street	County Road 51	County Road 25	Petawawa	
Renfrew County Road 17	Paquette Road; Old Hwy 17	Highway 17	Pembroke Street West (Pembroke City Limits)	Petawawa	Replaced by County Road 51 and County Road 55 in late 1990s
Renfrew County Road 19	Mud Lake Road; Boundary Road	County Road 35	County Road 24	Pembroke	
Renfrew County Road 20	Castleford Road; Bruce Street	Highway 60	County Road 1	Renfrew	
Renfrew County Road 21	Beachburg Road	County Road 40	County Road 7	Beachburg	
Renfrew County Road 22	Hyndford Road	Highway 41	County Road 5	Hyndford	
Renfrew County Road 23	Highland Road	County Road 2	Robertson Line (Lanark County limits)	Waba	Continues as Lanark County Road 20 (Waba Road) and City of Ottawa Road 20 (Kinburn Sideroad) to Dunrobin Road
Renfrew County Road 24	White Water Road	Highway 41	County Road 40	Stafford Township, Pembroke Township	
Renfrew County Road 25	Laurentian Drive	County Road 16	County Road 51	Petawawa	
Renfrew County Road 26	Doran Road	County Road 51	County Road 14	Petawawa	
Renfrew County Road 28	Barron Canyon Road	Petawawa Township limits	County Road 26	Petawawa Township	
Renfrew County Road 29	Drive-In Road; Mackay Street; Town Line Road	Highway 148	Highway 41	Pembroke	
Renfrew County Road 30	Lake Dore Road	Highway 60	Highway 41	Golden Lake	
Renfrew County Road 31	Lookout Road	County Road 12	County Road 49	Westmeath Township	
Renfrew County Road 34	Norton Road; Whelan Road	County Road 508	Highway 132	Admaston Township, Bagot Township	
Renfrew County Road 35	Jean Avenue	County Road 19	County Road 36	Pembroke	
Renfrew County Road 36	TV Tower Road	County Road 42	County Road 58	Pembroke	
Renfrew County Road 37	Murphy Road	Highway 17	County Road 51	Petawawa	
Renfrew County Road 40	Greenwood Road	Highway 148	Highway 17	Greenwood	Historical route of Highway 17
Renfrew County Road 41	Haley Road; Godfrey Road	Highway 17	Highway 60	Haley Station	Renumbered as County Road 61 in late 1990s
Renfrew County Road 42	Forest Lea Road	Highway 17	County Road 51	Pembroke, Forest Lea	
Renfrew County Road 45	Russett Drive; Campbell Drive	County Road 63	County Road 2	McNab Township	
Renfrew County Road 48	Magnesium Road	County Road 653	County Road 4	Ross Township	Magnesium Road continues to Kerr Line
Renfrew County Road 49	La Passe Road	County Road 21	County Road 50	La Passe	La Passe Road continues north to Bromley Line
Renfrew County Road 50	Gore Line	County Road 12	County Road 49	Westmeath, La Passe	
Renfrew County Road 51	Pembroke Street West; Petawawa Boulevard	County Road 55	Pembroke Street West (Pembroke City Limits)	Pembroke, Petawawa	
Renfrew County Road 52	Raglan Street South; Burnstown Road	Highway 60	County Road 2	Renfrew, Burnstown, White Lake	
Renfrew County Road 54	McLean Drive	Highway 17	County Road 3	Glasgow Station	
Renfrew County Road 55	Paquette Road	Highway 17	County Road 51	Petawawa	
Renfrew County Road 56	Woito Station Road	County Road 14	Highway 41	Wilberforce Township	
Renfrew County Road 58	Round Lake Road; Bruham Avenue; Trafalgar Road	Highway 60	County Road 51	Pembroke, Alice, Bonnechere Provincial Park, Round Lake Centre	Formerly part of Highway 62 and Highway 148
Renfrew County Road 59	Herrick Drive	Highway 417	County Road 1	Arnprior	Formerly part of Highway 15; downloaded to Town of Arnprior in 2004
Renfrew County Road 61	Haley Road; Godfrey Road	Highway 17	Highway 60	Haley Station	Formerly County Road 41 until late 1990s
Renfrew County Road 62	Combermere Road; John Street; Bay Street	Highway 60	Schweig Road (Hastings County limits)	Barry's Bay, Combermere	Formerly part of Highway 62; continues as Hastings County Road 62 (Peterson Colonization Road) to Maynooth
Renfrew County Road 63	Flat Rapids Road; Stewartville Road; Anderson Road; Miller Road	County Road 6	County Road 45	Stewartville	
Renfrew County Road 64	Opeongo Road	County Road 512	Highway 41	Grattan Township, Sebastopol Township	Opeongo Road continues in County Roads 512 and 66
Renfrew County Road 65	Centennial Lake Road	County Road 71	County Road 508	Brougham Township, Matawachan Township	
Renfrew County Road 66	Wilno South Road; Opeongo Road	Highway 60	County Road 512	Wilno	Opeongo Road continues from junction to Highway 60 near Krezel Road
Renfrew County Road 67	Simpson Pit Road	County Road 58	Highway 60	Round Lake Centre, Hagarty Township	
Renfrew County Road 68	Rockingham Road; Letterkenny Road	County Road 515	County Road 512	Radcliffe Township, Brudenell Township	Letterkenny Road continues south from junction to Quadeville
Renfrew County Road 69	Dunn Street; Siberia Road	Highway 60	Hastings County limits	Barry's Bay, Jones Township	continues as Hastings County Road 69 (Kamaniskeg Lake Road) to Peterson Colonization Road
Renfrew County Road 70	Ruby Road; Kokomis Road	County Road 512	Highway 60	Killaloe, South Algona Township, Golden Lake	
Renfrew County Road 71	Matawatchan Road	Highway 41	County Road 65	Griffith, Camel Chute	Matawatchan Road continues south to Vennachar
Renfrew County Road 72	Ridge Road	Highway 17	County Road 73; Deep River Road; Hillcrest Ave	Deep River	Assumed by Renfrew County on April 1, 2014.
Renfrew County Road 73	Deep River Road	County Road 72; Ridge Road; Hillcrest Ave	Highway 17	Deep River	Assumed by Renfrew County on April 1, 2014. Deep River Road continues north to Beach Ave
Renfrew County Road 508	Calabogie Road	County Road 65	Highway 17	Calabogie, Burnstown	Formerly Secondary Highway 508
Renfrew County Road 511	Lanark Road	County Road 508	Lanark County limits	Calabogie	Formerly Secondary Highway 511; continues as Lanark County Road 511 (Lanark Road) to Perth
Renfrew County Road 512	Foymount Road; Opeongo Road; Brudenell Road; Queen Street	Highway 60	Highway 41	Killaloe, Lake Clear, Eganville	Formerly Secondary Highway 512
Renfrew County Road 514	Schutt Road	County Road 515	Highway 28	Raglan Township	Formerly Secondary Highway 514
Renfrew County Road 515	Palmer Road; Quadeville Road	County Road 62	County Road 512	Combermere, Palmer Rapids, Quadeville	Formerly Secondary Highway 515
Renfrew County Road 517	Dafoe Road	County Road 62	Coulas Road (Hastings County limits)	Combermere	Formerly Secondary Highway 517; continues as Hastings County Road 517 to Boulter Road
Renfrew County Road 635	Swisha Road	Quebec border (Rapides-des-Joachims bridge)	Highway 17	Rolphton	Formerly Secondary Highway 635
Renfrew County Road 653	Chenaux Road	Highway 17	Quebec border (Portage-du-Fort bridge)	Haley Station, Chenaux	Formerly Secondary Highway 653; continues as Quebec Route 301
Former Route
