= Malotte Creek =

- Location of the mouth of the creek in Southern Ontario

Location
- Country: Canada
- Province: Ontario
- Region: Eastern Ontario
- County: Renfrew
- Municipality: Greater Madawaska

Physical characteristics
- Source: Malotte Lake
  - coordinates: 45°19′25″N 76°58′34″W
  - elevation: 362 m (1,188 ft)
- Mouth: Black Donald Creek
  - coordinates: 45°16′47″N 76°59′51″W
  - elevation: 263 m (863 ft)

Basin features
- River system: Saint Lawrence River drainage basin

Malotte Creek is a stream in Greater Madawaska, Renfrew County in Eastern Ontario, Canada. It is in the Saint Lawrence River drainage basin and is a left tributary of Black Donald Creek.

== Course ==
Malotte Creek begins at Malotte Lake and flows southwest. It gradually veers south, passes under Malotte Creek Road, and reaches its mouth at Black Donald Creek. Black Donald Creek flows via Black Donald Lake, the Madawaska River, and the Ottawa River to the Saint Lawrence River.
