= Tooey =

Tooey or Tooeys may refer to:

== People ==
- Carl Spaatz (1891–1974), US Air Force general
- Jim Tooey (born 1954), American actor
- Colonel Tooey, tour boat operator who established a colony of feral rhesus macaque in Silver Springs
- Tooey Courtemanche, CEO of Procore

=== Fictional characters ===
- Tooey, character in Weebleville
- Tooey Brown, character in Leave It to Beaver
- Tooey Ookami, character in Molly of Denali

== Places ==
- Tooeys Creek, stream in Renfrew County, Ontario, Canada
- Tooeys Lake, lake in Renfrew County, Ontario, Canada

== See also ==
- Tooheys Brewery, Australian brewery
- Tuohy (disambiguation)
