= Doorly =

Doorly is a surname. Notable people with the surname include:

- Edward Doorly (1868–1950), Irish Roman Catholic bishop
- Eleanor Doorly (1880–1950), British writer
- Henry Doorly (1879–1961), American journalist, newspaper editor and publisher
- Stokely Doorly (1882–1954), Trinidad and Tobago clergyman
- Wiltshire Doorly (died 1932), Trinidad and Tobago clergyman

== See also ==
- Mount Doorly, a mountain of Victoria Land, Antarctica
- Doorley, a surname
