= Stoughtons Creek =

- Location of the mouth of the creek in Southern Ontario

Location
- Country: Canada
- Province: Ontario
- Region: Eastern Ontario
- County: Renfrew
- Municipality: Greater Madawaska

Physical characteristics
- Source: Bagot Long Lake
  - coordinates: 45°14′41″N 76°38′50″W
  - elevation: 195 m (640 ft)
- Mouth: Calabogie Lake
  - coordinates: 45°16′10″N 76°42′18″W
  - elevation: 155 m (509 ft)

Stoughtons Creek is a stream in Greater Madawaska, Renfrew County in Eastern Ontario, Canada. The creek is in the Saint Lawrence River drainage basin.

The creek begins at Bagot Long Lake and flows northwest to Dempseys Lake. It then heads west and reaches its mouth at the northeast of Calabogie Lake. Calabogie Lake flows via the Madawaska River and the Ottawa River to the Saint Lawrence River.
