= Tooeys Creek =

Stream in Renfrew County, Ontario, Canada

- Location of the mouth of the creek in Southern Ontario

Location
- Country: Canada
- Province: Ontario
- Region: Eastern Ontario
- County: Renfrew
- Municipality: Greater Madawaska

Physical characteristics
- Source: Tooeys Lake
  - coordinates: 45°20′28″N 77°01′25″W
  - elevation: 329 m (1,079 ft)
- Mouth: Black Donald Creek
  - coordinates: 45°19′19″N 77°02′17″W
  - elevation: 302 m (991 ft)

Basin features
- River system: Saint Lawrence River drainage basin

Tooeys Creek is a stream in Greater Madawaska, Renfrew County in Eastern Ontario, Canada. It is in the Saint Lawrence River drainage basin and, together with an unnamed stream, combines to form Black Donald Creek.

== Course ==
Tooeys Creek begins at the southeast end of Tooeys Lake and flows southwest, exiting the lake at the site of a rest area on Ontario Highway 41. It passes back and forth underneath the highway, then reaches its mouth at the source confluence of Black Donald Creek south of the highway. Black Donald Creek flows via Black Donald Lake, the Madawaska River, and the Ottawa River to the Saint Lawrence River.
