= Doorley =

Doorley is a surname. Notable people with the surname include:

- James Doorley, Irish businessman
- Joseph A. Doorley Jr. (1930-2022), Irish-American lawyer and politician
- Sandra Doorley, American lawyer

== See also ==
- Dooley
- Doorley Creek, a river of Renfrew County, Ontario, Canada
- Doorly, a surname
