= Calabogie Lake =

Reservoir lake in Ontario, Canada

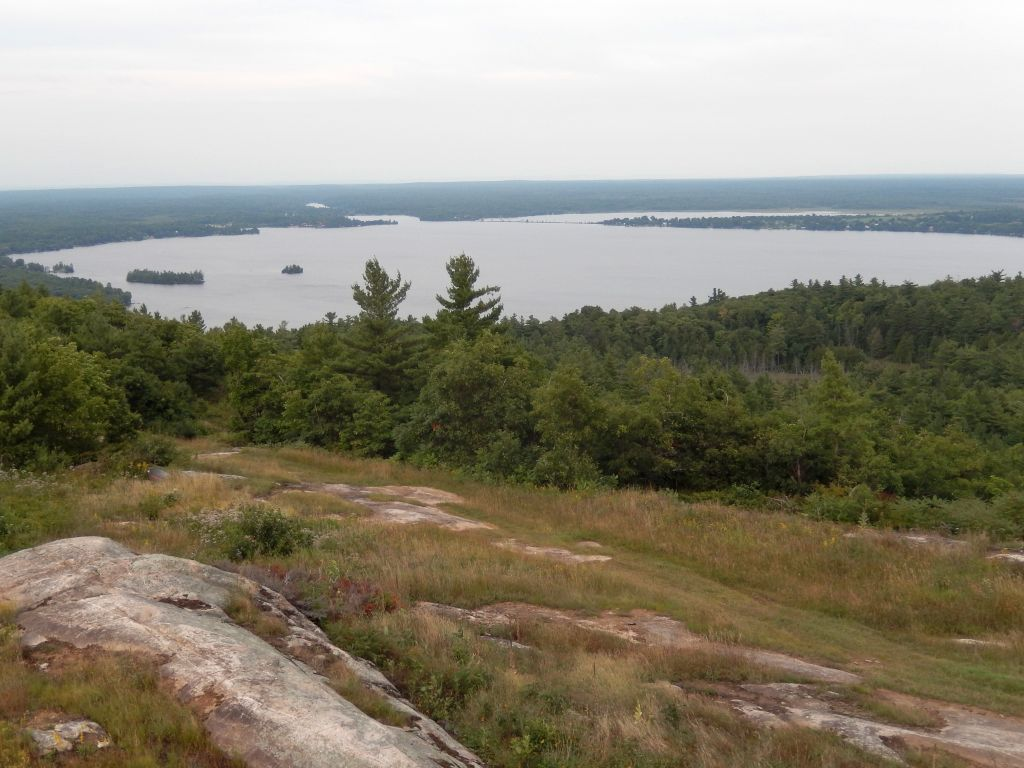
- Calabogie Lake seen from Calabogie Peaks

- Location in Southern Ontario
- Location: Renfrew County, Ontario
- Coordinates: 45°16′38″N 76°44′34″W
- Part of: Saint Lawrence River drainage basin
- Primary inflows: Madawaska River
- Primary outflows: Madawaska River
- Basin countries: Canada
- Max. length: 6.5 km (4.0 mi)
- Max. width: 4.0 km (2.5 mi)
- Surface elevation: 155 m (509 ft)

Calabogie Lake (/ˌkæləˈboʊɡi/ KAL-ə-BOH-ghee) is a reservoir lake in the municipality of Greater Madawaska, Renfrew County, in Eastern Ontario, Canada. It is part of the Saint Lawrence River drainage basin, and is located on the Madawaska River system, in the geographic townships of Bagot and Blythfield.

The original natural lake expanded to its current dimensions upon the completion of the Calabogie Station dam and generating station (now owned and operated by Ontario Power Generation) during World War I.

The communities of Calabogie, Grassy Bay and Barryvale are on the lake. Renfrew County Road 511 crosses the lake in Calabogie near the river mouth, and Renfrew County Road 508 runs along the northwest shore.

== Tributaries ==
Clockwise from the mouth

- Stoughtons Creek
- Madawaska River
- Constant Creek
