= Twohig =

Twohig is a modern variant surname and Anglicisation of the pre 10th century Gaelic ‘O’Tuathaigh’ meaning ‘descendant of the chief’ who ruled over the ‘Tuath’ or tribal territory. The first recorded spelling of this name is that of Teag O’Tuathaigh in the Annals of the Four Masters, in 1447. Church register recordings of Twohig date back to 1610.

Twohig is related to Tuohy. Notable people with the surname include:

- Edward Twohig, 20th century Canadian politician
- Edward Twohig, (born 1969), Artist-Printmaker, Author, Curator & Educator.
- John Twohig (1806-1891), Irish born Texan banker.
- Fiachra Twohig (born 2004), Irish footballer
