= Touhey =

Touhey is a surname. Notable people with the surname include:

- Bill Touhey (1906–1999), Canadian ice hockey player
- Michael J. Touhey (1844–1904), American politician
- Patsy Touhey (1865–1923), American comedian
- Peyton Touhey, fictional character

== See also ==
- Touhy (disambiguation)
