= Black Donald Creek =

- Location of the mouth of the creek in Southern Ontario

Location
- Country: Canada
- Province: Ontario
- Region: Eastern Ontario
- County: Renfrew
- Municipality: Greater Madawaska

Physical characteristics
- Source confluence: Confluence of an unnamed creek with Tooeys Creek
  - coordinates: 45°19′19″N 77°02′17″W
  - elevation: 302 m (991 ft)
- Mouth: Black Donald Lake on the Madawaska River
  - coordinates: 45°13′34″N 76°57′32″W
  - elevation: 248 m (814 ft)

Basin features
- River system: Saint Lawrence River drainage basin
- Tributaries
  - left: Malotte Creek
  - right: Doorley Creek

Black Donald Creek is a stream in Greater Madawaska, Renfrew County in Eastern Ontario, Canada. It is in the Saint Lawrence River drainage basin and is a left tributary of the Madawaska River at Black Donald Lake.

== Course ==
Black Donald Creek begins at the confluence of an unnamed creek with Tooeys Creek just east of Ontario Highway 41. It flows south as the road diverges to the west, takes in the right tributary Doorley Creek, and continues south. The creek takes in the left tributary Malotte Creek, passes along the eastern boundary of Centennial Lake Provincial Nature Reserve, flows under Renfrew County Road 65, and reaches its mouth at the north shore of Black Donald Lake on the Madawaska River. The Madawaska River flows via the Ottawa River to the Saint Lawrence River.

== Tributaries ==
- Malotte Creek (left)
- Doorley Creek (right)
- Tooeys Creek (source confluence)
