= Doorley Creek =

- Location of the mouth of the creek in Southern Ontario

Location
- Country: Canada
- Province: Ontario
- Region: Eastern Ontario
- County: Renfrew
- Municipality: Greater Madawaska

Physical characteristics
- Source confluence: Confluence of two unnamed creeks
  - coordinates: 45°18′13″N 77°03′45″W
  - elevation: 347 m (1,138 ft)
- Mouth: Black Donald Creek
  - coordinates: 45°17′35″N 77°01′09″W
  - elevation: 275 m (902 ft)

Basin features
- River system: Saint Lawrence River drainage basin

Doorley Creek is a stream in Greater Madawaska, Renfrew County in Eastern Ontario, Canada. It is in the Saint Lawrence River drainage basin and is a right tributary of Black Donald Creek.

== Course ==
Doorley Creek begins at the confluence of two unnamed creeks just north of Ontario Highway 41. It flows southeast under the highway, then under the local Doorley Creek Road; from this point to its mouth, it is paralleled by the road. The creek turns south, then again southeast, and reaches its mouth at Black Donald Creek. Black Donald Creek flows via Black Donald Lake, the Madawaska River, and the Ottawa River to the Saint Lawrence River.
