= Ontario Highway 148 =

Ontario provincial highway

Highway 148
- Highway 148 highlighted in red

Route information
- Maintained by the Ministry of Transportation of Ontario
- Length: 7.0 km (4.3 mi)
- Existed: September 10, 1982–present

Major junctions
- West end: Highway 41 south (MacKay Street) in Pembroke
- East end: R-148 at L'Isle-aux-Allumettes

Location
- Country: Canada
- Province: Ontario

Highway system
- Ontario provincial highways; Current; Former; 400-series
← Highway 144	→ Highway 400
Former provincial highways
Highway 169 →

King's Highway 148, commonly referred to as Highway 148, is a provincially maintained highway in Ontario, Canada. The highway acts as an extension of Route 148 in Quebec, once connecting it with Highway 17, the Trans-Canada Highway, near Pembroke. It was shortened to its present terminus in 1997, and now connects downtown Pembroke to the provincial border. It follows a route that was once part of Highway 17 and Highway 62 until the Pembroke Bypass opened in 1982.

The 7.0-kilometre (4.3 mi) route of Highway 148 takes it along the Ontario shoreline of the Ottawa River from the outskirts of Pembroke to the opposite shore at L'Isle-aux-Allumettes, where it crosses the river into Quebec. The section within Pembroke is locally maintained under a Connecting Link agreement.

== Route description ==
Highway 148 within Pembroke

Highway 148 connects Pembroke to the Quebec border at L'Isle-aux-Allumettes, a distance of 5 km (3.1 mi). It originally connected to Highway 17 west of Pembroke, and was 15.1 km (9.4 mi) long. Its length was truncated on April 1, 1997, when the province downloaded responsibility for the portion from Highway 17 to Boundary Street. At that time, the connecting link status of Highway 148 through Pembroke itself was revised, and the current signed terminus of the highway is now Mackay Street, which was formerly Highway 41. Approximately 11,400 vehicles drive along Highway 148 on an average day, with just under half that many crossing from or into Quebec.

Provincial control of Highway 148 begins at the Pembroke boundary, approximately 60 m (200 ft) northwest of Angus Campbell Drive. From there, the route travels southeast through the urban-rural fringe of the city, passing east of two large shopping complexes. After passing west of the community of Pleasant View, the route enters a rural area and curves south alongside farmland.

At a four-way stop with channelized right turn lanes, drivers must turn to remain on the highway. To the south is Renfrew County Road 40, which continues to Highway 17 at the southern end of the Pembroke Bypass. Highway 148 continues east, crossing the Ottawa Valley Railway and the entrance to Hazley Bay before entering the community of Cotnam Island. The highway curves northeast and crosses the Ottawa River, entering Quebec midspan.

== History ==
Animation of highway routes near Pembroke, from 1936 to now

Highway 148 ends at the Ottawa River, where it crosses into Quebec

Highway 148 follows the route of what was the northernmost section of Highway 62, prior to the opening of the Pembroke Bypass. Highway 17 was also signed concurrently with Highway 62 between Trafalgar Road and Renfrew County Road 40, as it followed the Ottawa River in the Pembroke area at that time. On September 10, 1982, the Pembroke Bypass was ceremoniously opened to traffic, diverting Highway 17 to the west. In the process, Highway 62 was truncated at the new bypass; the removed section was redesignated Highway 148, giving it the same number as the route in Quebec that it served to connect with the Trans-Canada Highway. Highway 148 was 14.4 km (8.9 mi) long. Its length was truncated on April 1, 1997, when the province downloaded responsibility for the portions between Highway 17 and Highway 41 to the Town of Pembroke and County of Renfrew. The Pembroke Connecting Link agreement shares the responsibility for Highway 41 northeast of Highway 17 and for Highway 148 from Highway 41 to Cedar Lane between the province and the town.

== Major intersections ==
The following table lists the major junctions along Highway 148, as noted by the Ministry of Transportation of Ontario.

Division	Location	km	mi	Destinations	Notes
Renfrew	Laurentian Valley	−8.1	−5.0	County Road 58 west (Round Lake Road) Highway 17 / TCH – North Bay, Ottawa	Former Highway 148 western terminus; formerly Highway 62 west; former Highway 148 follows Renfrew County Road 58 east
Pembroke		−2.9	−1.8	County Road 58 ends County Road 35 west (Boundary Road) / Trafalgar Road	County Road 58 eastern terminus; former Highway 148 follows Trafalgar Road
Pembroke		−2.1	−1.3	Pembroke Street	Former Highway 148 follows Pembroke Street; to County Road 51
Pembroke		0.0	0.0	Highway 41 south (Mackay Street)	Beginning of Highway 148 portion of Pembroke Connecting Link agreement
Pembroke		2.0	1.2	Cedar Lane	End of Pembroke Connecting Link agreement
Renfrew	Laurentian Valley	3.5	2.2	County Road 29 (Drive In Road)	
Renfrew	Laurentian Valley	5.2	3.2	County Road 40 (Greenwood Road) – Ottawa	
Ottawa River		7.0	4.3	Allumettes Bridge	
Ottawa River		7.0	4.3	R-148 east – Gatineau	Continuation into Quebec
1.000 mi = 1.609 km; 1.000 km = 0.621 mi: Closed/former
