= Head, Clara and Maria =

- Township (lower-tier)
- United Townships of Head, Clara and Maria
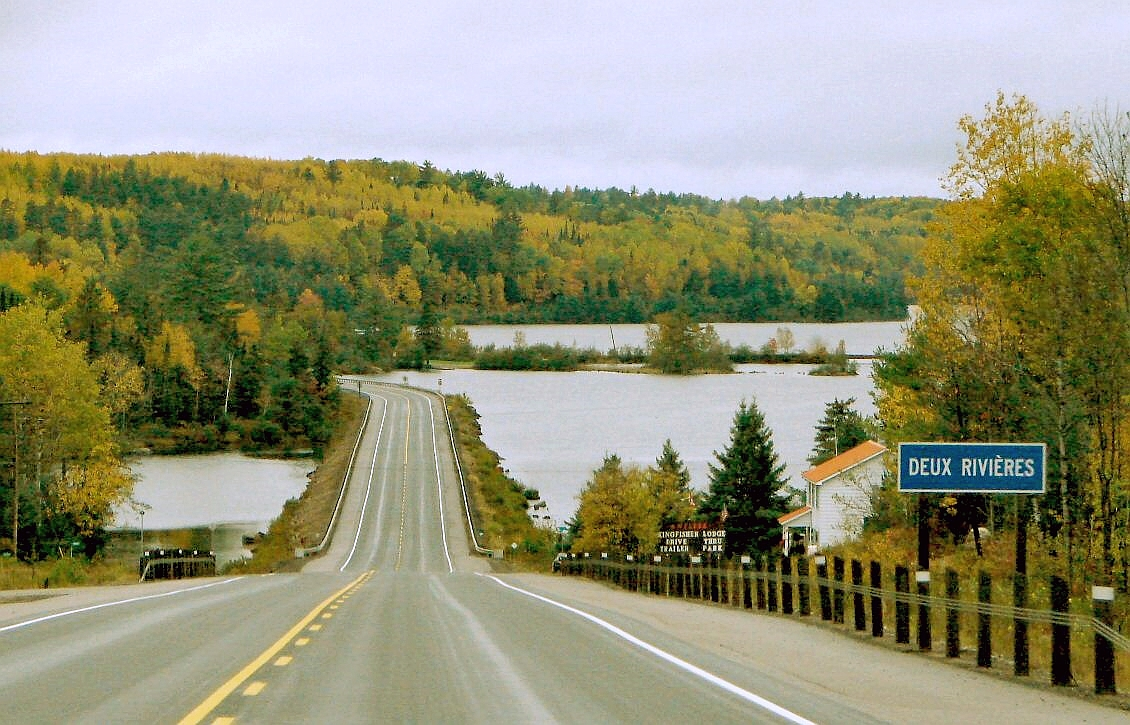
- Highway 17 and Ottawa River at Deux-Rivières

- Location within Renfrew County Location within Southern Ontario
- Coordinates: 46°10′N 78°00′W
- Country: Canada
- Province: Ontario
- County: Renfrew
- Incorporated: 1878

Government
  - Mayor: Debbi Grills

Area
  - Land: 719.20 km^{2} (277.68 sq mi)

Population (2021)
  - Total: 267
  - Density: 0.4/km^{2} (1.0/sq mi)
- Time zone: UTC-5 (EST)
  - Summer (DST): UTC-4 (EDT)
- Postal codes: Bissett Creek: K0J 1E0; Deux Rivières: K0J 1R0; Mackey: K0J 2B0; Stonecliffe: K0J 2K0
- Area codes: 613, 705
- Website: www.townshipsof headclaramaria.ca

Head, Clara and Maria, officially the United Townships of Head, Clara and Maria, is a municipality and incorporated township in Renfrew County in eastern Ontario, Canada, It is on the Ottawa River and on the northern edge of Algonquin Park.

Virtually all the communities (Deux-Rivières, Bissett Creek, Stonecliffe and Mackey) and activities are along Highway 17; the rest of the township is largely crown land, which is mostly wilderness. Property taxes are the lowest in Renfrew County.

== History ==
The township of Head was named in honour of Sir Edmund Walker Head, 8th Baronet who served as Lieutenant-Governor of New Brunswick 1847-1854 and Governor-General of Canada 1854-1861. The township of Maria was named in honour of his wife, Lady Anna Maria Head (Nee Yorke) (1808-1890).

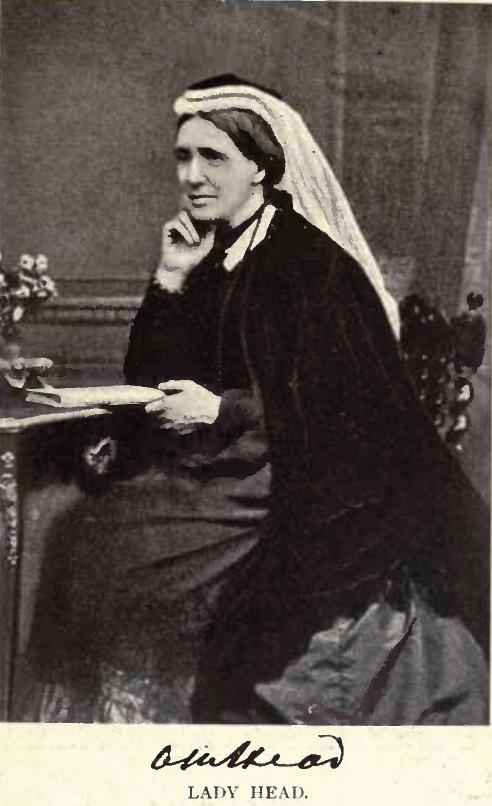
Lady Anna Maria Head (née Yorke)

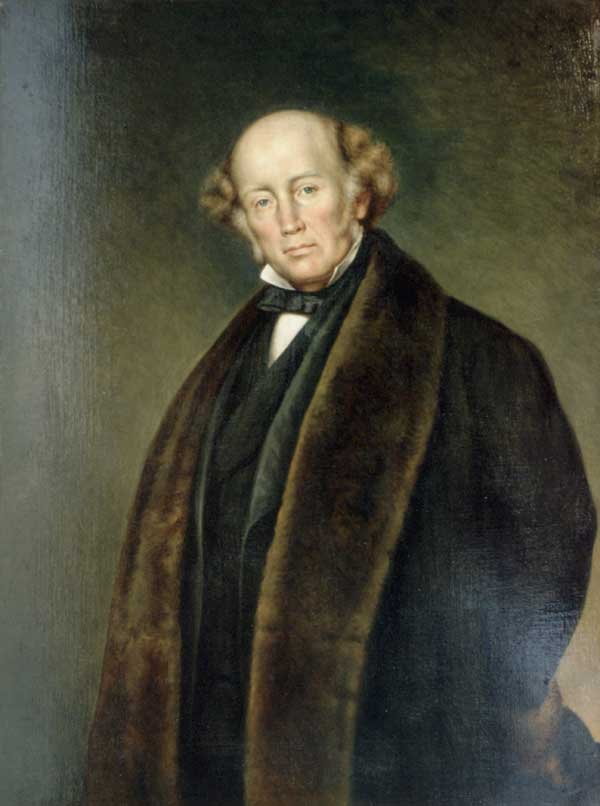
Sir Edmund Walker Head, 8th Baronet

== Geography ==
Head, Clara and Maria is bordered on the north by the Ottawa River and on the south by Algonquin Provincial Park. Trans Canada Highway 17 runs through the four hamlets which make up this municipality.

The municipality has numerous with lakes and rivers, providing fishing, hunting, hiking, canoeing, and snowmobiling opportunities.

=== Communities ===
The township includes the communities of Aylen, Bissett Creek, Deux-Rivières, Mackey and Stonecliffe.

Deux-Rivières provides access to Algonquin Park via Brent Road. Stonecliffe is home to the municipal office and is near Driftwood Provincial Park.

== Demographics ==
In the 2021 Census of Population conducted by Statistics Canada, Head, Clara and Maria had a population of 267 living in 116 of its 133 total private dwellings, a change of 7.7% from its 2016 population of 248. With a land area of 719.2 km^{2} (277.7 sq mi), it had a population density of 0.4/km^{2} (1.0/sq mi) in 2021.

Historical census populations – Head, Clara and Maria

| Year | Pop. | ±% |
|---|---|---|
| 1921 | 488 | — |
| 1931 | 536 | +9.8% |
| 1941 | 620 | +15.7% |
| 1951 | 645 | +4.0% |
| 1956 | 549 | −14.9% |
| 1961 | 549 | +0.0% |

| Year | Pop. | ±% |
|---|---|---|
| 1966 | 554 | +0.9% |
| 1971 | 474 | −14.4% |
| 1976 | 433 | −8.6% |
| 1981 | 372 | −14.1% |
| 1986 | 293 | −21.2% |
| 1991 | 256 | −12.6% |

| Year | Pop. | ±% |
|---|---|---|
| 1996 | 294 | +14.8% |
| 2001 | 228 | −22.4% |
| 2006 | 228 | +0.0% |
| 2011 | 235 | +3.1% |
| 2016 | 248 | +5.5% |
| 2021 | 267 | +7.7% |

Source: Statistics Canada

Mother tongue (2021):

- English as first language: 92.5 %
- French as first language: 5.7 %
- English and French as first languages: 0 %
- Other as first language: 1.9 %

== Local government ==
List of former reeves:

- Jim Donnelly (1864)
- James Dunlop (1887–1902)
- W. P. Dunlop (1904–1909)
- Henery Beauchamp (1912–1916)
- J.E. Jennings (1917–1924)
- James E. Carey (1930–1936)
- D. A. Francoeur (1937–1950)
- George Clouthier (1951)
- Leslie J. Donnelly (1952–1964)
- Art Yates (1965–1968, 1971–1974)
- Loretta Boissonneault (1969–1970)
- Wyman Jennings (1975)
- Grant Horricks (1976–1980)
- Percy Watts (1981–1985)
- Ernie Boudreau (1986–1991)
- Lita Therrien (1992–1997)
- Colleen Clarriere (1998)
- William Crowshaw (1999–2006)
- Tammy Lea Stewart (née Sonnenburg) (2006–2014)
- Jim Gibson (2014–2017)
- Robert James Reid (2017–2018)
- Debbi Grills (2018–present)

== Transportation ==
Highway 17 is the main road connecting the community to destinations to the northwest and west. Ontario Northland Motor Coach Services operates an intercity bus route from Ottawa to Sudbury along Highway 17.

== Notable people ==
- Michael James Heney, a railroad contractor known for his work on the first two railroads built in Alaska, the White Pass and Yukon Route and the Copper River and Northwestern Railway, was born in Stonecliffe.

== See also ==
- List of francophone communities in Ontario
- List of townships in Ontario
