= Centennial Lake (Renfrew County) =

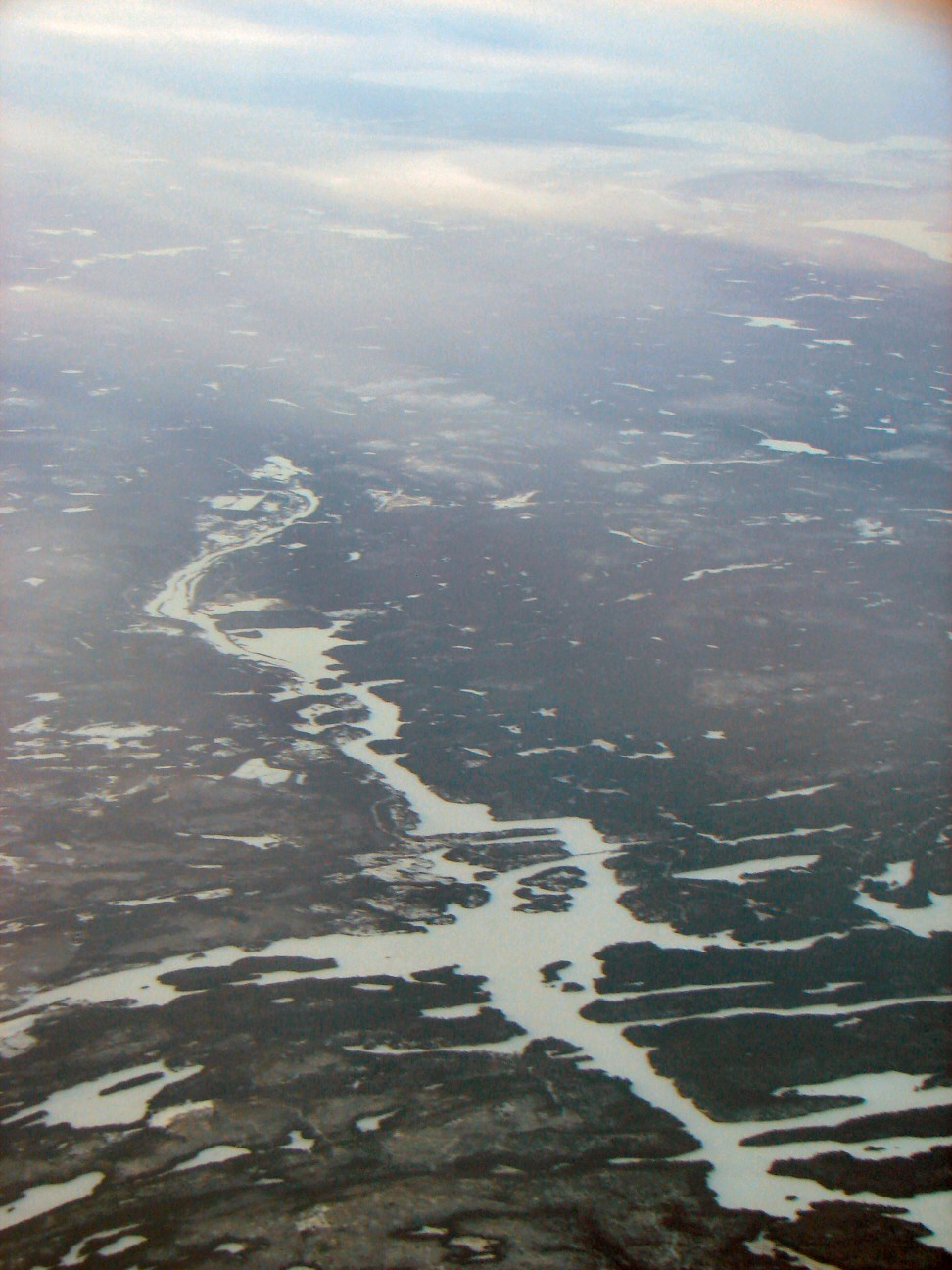
- Centennial Lake, looking northwest towards Griffith

- Location in Southern Ontario
- Location: Renfrew County & Frontenac County, Ontario
- Coordinates: 45°09′22″N 77°03′09″W
- Type: Reservoir
- Part of: Saint Lawrence River drainage basin
- Primary inflows: Madawaska River, Mackie Creek
- Primary outflows: Madawaska River
- Basin countries: Canada
- First flooded: 1966
- Surface elevation: 248 metres (814 ft)

Centennial Lake is a reservoir lake in the Township of Greater Madawaska, Renfrew County, and the Township of North Frontenac, Frontenac County, in Eastern Ontario, Canada. It is on the Madawaska River and is part of the Saint Lawrence River drainage basin.

The lake is L-shaped, with the downstroke oriented northwest/southeast, and the cross stroke oriented northeast–southwest. All but a tiny tip at the south end of the lake, the crux of the "L", is in the Township of Greater Madawaska, Renfrew County. The major inflow, at Camel Chute at the northwest, is the Madawaska River. A second primary inflow is Mackie Creek at the south, controlled by a weir dam. The major outflow is also the Madawaska River, which flows directly into Black Donald Lake at the northeast. The Madawaska River then flows via the Ottawa River to the Saint Lawrence River and thence to the Atlantic Ocean. Renfrew County Road 65 crosses the northwest arm of the lake over a long, low, concrete bridge.

== History ==
Centennial Lake, and Black Donald Lake adjacent downstream, were created by the construction of the Mountain Chute Generating Station and dam and an associated embankment dam in 1965–1966. Black Donald Lake subsumed the previous White Fish Lake and drowned the former mining community of Black Donald Mines, whose graphite mine by then had been exhausted. The reservoir took six months to fill and flooded 8,500 acres (3,440 ha).

The lake is primarily used for recreation, tourism and cottages.

A forest fire on the south side of the lake forced some evacuations in June 2023.

== Tributaries ==
Clockwise from the inflow of the Madawaska River

- Morrow Creek
- Mackie Creek
- Colton Creek
- Glenfield Creek

== See also ==
- List of lakes in Ontario
