= Toohey =

Toohey may refer to:

- Toohey (surname)
- Tooheys, Australian brewery
- Toohey Mountain, in Australia
