= Calabogie Peaks =

Canadian ski resort

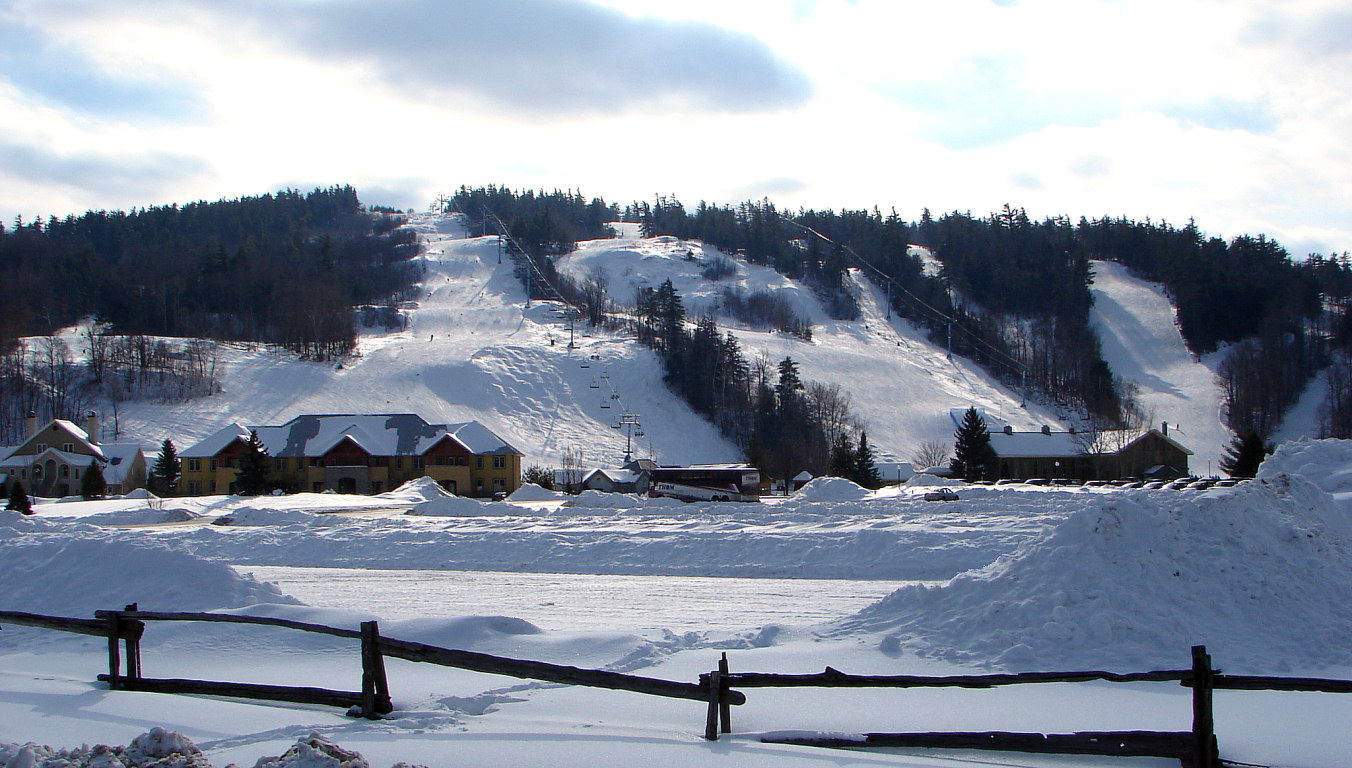

- Location within Southern Ontario
- Location: Dicksons Mountain
- Nearest city: Ottawa
- Coordinates: 45°16′30″N 76°46′55″W
- Vertical: 232 m (761 ft)
- Top elevation: 386 m (1,266 ft)
- Base elevation: 154 m (505 ft)
- Skiable area: 28 ha (69 acres)
- Trails: 24
- Longest run: 2,121.7 m (6,961 ft)
- Lift system: 2 Doppelmayr quad chairlift 1 carpet lift
- Lift capacity: 6,300 passengers/hr
- Terrain parks: 1
- Snowfall: 203 centimetres (80 in)
- Snowmaking: 95%
- Website: www.calabogie.com

Calabogie Peaks is a ski resort in the municipality of Greater Madawaska, Renfrew County in Eastern Ontario, Canada. It is located 80 kilometres (50 mi) west of Ottawa, and was founded in 1969. Although the resort is named after the nearby community of Calabogie and Calabogie Lake, the mountain is called Dicksons Mountain. Calabogie Peaks Resort offers the highest vertical drop among public ski hills in Ontario, 238 metres (781 ft). In addition to the beginner hill, Calabogie offers the longest beginner trail in Ontario, as well as plenty of intermediate and expert runs.

== Resort facilities ==
The resort features 2 chairlifts and 1 carpet lift. As of 2022, there were 24 trails recorded, all of which are historically named after Calabogie.

The resort consists of 3 levels of difficulty for runs: beginner, intermediate and expert. In 2016, it was documented the mountain consisted of 30% beginner runs, 45% intermediate runs, and 25% expert runs. The longest run as of 2016 was recorded to be 2.1 km long.

In 2016, the Top Hut was introduced to provide a shelter for guests at the top of the mountain. In the winter, the Top Hut provides guest with warmth from a wood stove, while in the summer the Top Hut provides guests with shelter from the sun.

== Seasonal activities ==
Calabogie Peaks offers year-round activities to bring in tourists from all areas.

Summer activities at the Peaks include bike trails, hiking trails, the beach front, boat rentals, the Boathouse Bar & Grill, a 9-hole golf course, chair-lift rides up the mountain on October weekends for fall colours, as well as annual festivals. During the summer, the Calabogie Peaks hosts the Blues & Ribs Fest as well as the Mountain Man Music Festival. Both events occur within the July and August months. In the past, the Calabogie Peaks also hosted the Wake Surf nationals.

Winter activities at the Peaks include downhill skiing or snowboarding the mountain, cross-country skiing, ice skating, ice fishing, snowmobiling and snowshoeing.

== Accommodations ==
Calabogie Peaks offers tourists 2 options for onsite lodging: guests can stay at the Calabogie Peaks Hotel or stay in the Mountain Lodges. The Dickson Manor hotel includes an outdoor hot-tub, indoor swimming pool, fitness room, complimentary parking, wireless internet, tennis courts and Canthooks, a casual fine dining restaurant.

== History ==
Facilities for skiing were first established on the mountain in 1969. The mountain was originally opened with T-bars to get to the mountain top. In 1976, Calabogie Peaks opened its first chairlift. Growth at Calabogie Peaks occurred in 1986 when the Murphy family and other investors expanded the hill. The accommodations as well as the lodge were added with the help of Murphy and the investors. The current beach area was originally primarily a wetland but in 1986 a beachfront was added along with a 9-hole golf course to reinvent the business and turn it into a 4-season resort. Construction occurred in the years of 2000 and 2004 to introduce a larger chairlift and the Calabogie Peaks Hotel, a boutique hotel. In 2009-2011, a new snowmaking system was installed and Calabogie Peaks grew rapidly through restructured and redefined mountain trails. Currently, the ownership of Calabogie Peaks is still held within the bloodline of Murphy's family, with Paul Murphy being the current owner.

Currently there is no racing program offered at Calabogie.

== Wedding and conference ==
Calabogie Peaks offers a venue for business meetings and caters to weddings year round inside the resort as well as outside. Weddings can take place inside the reception halls, along the beachfront or at the base of the hill.

== Snow school ==
Ski programs are offered to all ages. Beginning with the Skiwee Program guests are invited to take lessons through the Calabogie Peaks. The options vary, guests are invited to take group lessons or private lessons at their own choice Also offered at the resort are the certification courses, Canadian Ski Instructors Association ("CSIA"), the Canadian Association of Snowboard Instructors ("CASI"), and the Canadian Ski Coaches Federation ("CSCF").

== Surrounding area ==
Calabogie Peaks is located within a small town called Calabogie in the township of Greater Madawaska. Calabogie is known for its lake that borders the communities of Calabogie, Grassy Bay and Barryvale. Calabogie is primarily a cottage town, visited most frequently in the months of the summer. Throughout the summer, Calabogie brings in tourists for its golf courses, the Calabogie Highlands 18-hole course along Calabogie Lake as well as the 9-hole golf course offered at Calabogie Peaks. Calabogie Motorsports Park is open during the spring-fall months and is known as the longest race track within Canada, recognized as a world-class facility, the Park offers a 3.14 mile track. Another outdoor attraction within Calabogie involves the existing trails behind the ski hill, trails such as Eagles Nest, Skyline trail and Manitou trail are open year-round. Calabogie has a small selection of family owned restaurants and two general stores for pit stops and gas fill ups. In 2014, the Calabogie Brewing Company opened its doors as the first micro brewery within Greater Madawaska.

== Real estate ==
There are premium properties sold down the road from the Calabogie Peaks through Barrett Chute properties. Property pricing varies according to view, nature and waterfront. Barrett Chute is surrounded with thousands of acres of Crown (publicly owned) land.

== See also ==
- Mount Pakenham
- Camp Fortune
- List of ski areas and resorts in Canada
