= Stokely Doorly =

Trinidadian archdeacon (1882–1954)

Charles Stokely Doorly, OBE (20 June 1882 – 23 December 1954) was Archdeacon of Trinidad North from 1943 until his death.

Doorley was educated at Selwyn College, Cambridge and ordained in 1908. After curacies in Kettering and San Fernando he was at Queen's Royal College from 1911: eventually becoming its Principal in 1938.

His elder brother was a master mariner and author.
