= Norcan Lake =

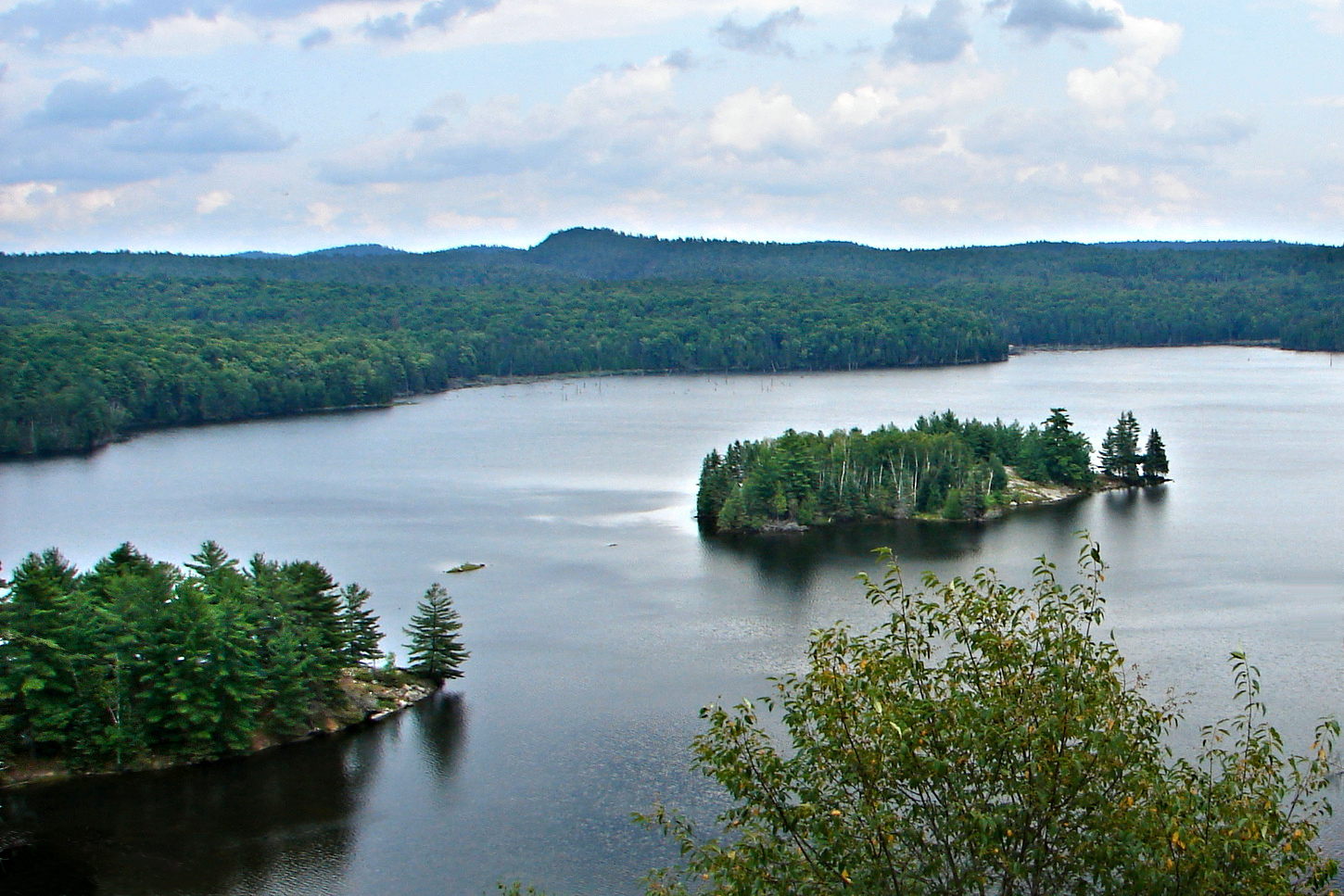

- Location in Southern Ontario
- Location: North Frontenac, Ontario
- Coordinates: 45°09′41″N 76°52′00″W
- Type: Reservoir
- Primary inflows: Madawaska River
- Primary outflows: Madawaska River
- Basin countries: Canada
- Max. length: 8 km (5.0 mi)
- Max. width: 1 km (0.62 mi)
- Surface elevation: 194 m (636 ft)

Norcan Lake is a reservoir lake in the municipality of North Frontenac, Frontenac County in Eastern Ontario, Canada. It is on the Madawaska River system, is part of the Saint Lawrence River drainage basin, and is located in geographic townships of North Canonto Township and South Canonto Township.

The lake was formed when land flooded upon the completion of the Barrett Chute dam and generating station in 1943.

== Tributaries ==
Clockwise from the mouth

- Reddys Creek
- Norcan Creek
- Juniper Creek
- Madawaska River

== See also ==
- List of lakes in Ontario
