= Touhy =

Touhy may refer to:

== People with the surname ==
- John Touhy (1919–1983), American politician
- Patrick L. Touhy (1839–1911), American businessman
- Roger Touhy (1898–1959), Irish American mob boss

== Places ==
- Touhy Avenue, road in Illinois
- Touhy, Nebraska, an unincorporated community, United States

== Other uses ==
- Touhy process, a legal framework established in the case against Roger Touhy

== See also ==
- Tuohy (disambiguation)
