= Quadeville, Ontario =

Quadeville
- unincorporated community
- Location within Ontario
- Coordinates: 45°18′56″N 77°22′45″W
- Country: Canada
- Province: Ontario
- County: Renfrew County
- Municipality: Brudenell, Lyndoch and Raglan
- Settled: 1868
- Named: 1893 (Straytay)
- Renamed (incorrectly): 1907 (Quadville)
- Renamed (correctly): 1922 (Quadeville)
- Founder: Quade family

Population
  - Total: 300

Quadeville is a rural community in eastern Ontario, located approximately 60 kilometres southwest of Renfew, Ontario.

The community has a population of around 300 people, a general store, a community centre, and the Quadeville Pentecostal Church.

The settlement was founded in 1867 and named Strathtay, before being renamed at Quadville and then Quadeville.

The community is a tourist attraction for visitors keen to a see a cabin that is rumoured to be once owned by American gangster Al Capone. The cabin was built by August Kauffeldt in 1942.

== History ==
Quadeville was settled by the German immigrant Quade family in 1868. The settlement was named as Strathtay in 1893.

The Quade family built a gristmill, a saw mill, a sash and door factory, and the Lutheran Church.

In 1907, residents requested that the town be renamed as Quadeville, in honour of August Frederick Quade, the son of the first settler. The paperwork was returned with the typographical error of Quadville. The spelling was formally corrected in 1921 to Quadeville.

The Quadeville East Mine was opened in 1926. Between 2 and 4 tones of beryl were initially mined. A further 2,020 kg of beryl were mined in 1927. The Quadeville West Mine (4.5km west of Quadeville) was opened in 1935 by Renfrew Minerals Limited to mine for beryl, but the amount mined was low. The mining company later mined 612 tones of feldspar. From 1948, Canadian Veryllium Mines and Alloys Limited mined beryl and feldspar. In the 2000s, the company mined rose quartz. The East Mine is now known as the Beryl Pit and the West Mine is now known as the Rose Quartz Quarry. Both are owned by Aquarose company.

The town was formally named Quadeville in 1948.

Quadeville residents Lila Yuke and her two children Ivan Yuke (aged 10) and Barbara Yuke (aged 13) drowned in Cameron Lake on 15 July 1953.

Robert Quade, the son of the first settler in Quadeville, was killed in Quadeville by a car driven by Gerald Kauffeldt in August 1965.

In October 2026, a teenager pled guilty to sexually assaulting an eight year old girl the prior year in the community.
