= Wiltshire Doorly =

Wiltshire Stokely Doorly was Archdeacon of Trinidad from 1929 to 1931.

Doorley was ordained in 1878. After a curacy at Holy Trinity, Trinidad he was Rector of St Paul, San Fernando; and it's Rural Dean from 1895 to 1929.

An Honorary Canon of Holy Trinity Cathedral, Trinidad from 1894, he died on 20 September 1932.

His son was a master mariner and author.
