= Toohey (surname) =

Toohey is a surname of Irish origin. Notable people with the surname include:

- Alex Toohey (born 2004), Australian basketball player
- Cynthia Toohey (1934–2021), American politician
- James Toohey (prospector) (1827–1883), Irish-Australian land owner of the early colony of Brisbane
- John Peter Toohey (1879–1946), American writer and publicist
- John Toohey (judge) (1930–2015), Australian judge and Justice of the High Court of Australia
- John Toohey (politician) (1839–1903), Irish-born Australian politician and brewer
- Meghan Toohey, folk-rock singer/songwriter
- Peter Toohey (born 1954), Australian cricketer

Fictional characters:

- Ellsworth Toohey, character in Ayn Rand's novel The Fountainhead
