= Sand Point, Ontario =

Community in the township of McNab/Braeside, Ontario, Canada

Coordinates: 45°29′15″N 76°26′05″W

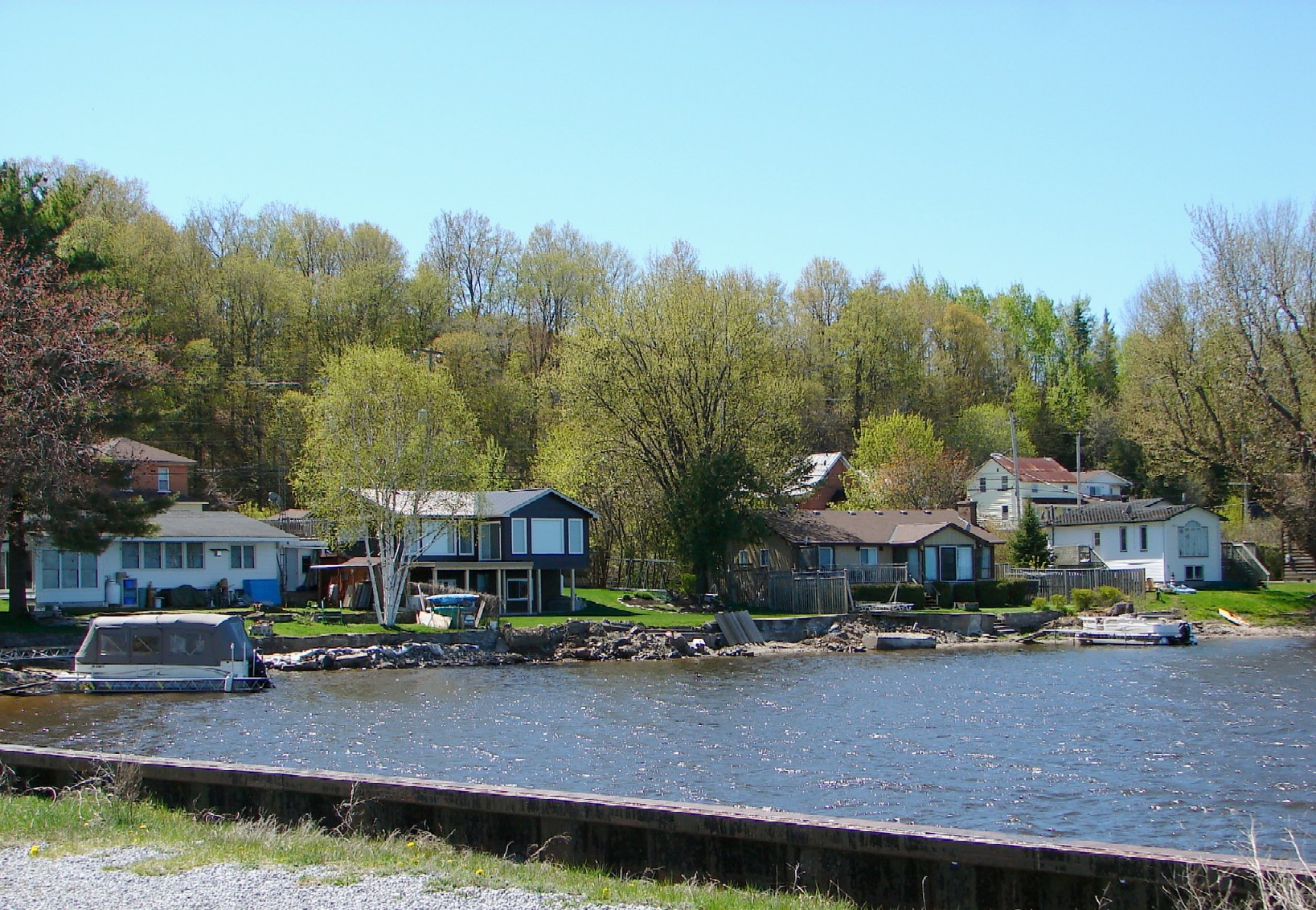
Sand Point

Sand Point is a community in the township of McNab/Braeside, Ontario, Canada, along the Ottawa River, roughly six miles to the west of Arnprior on the River Road. In September 1865 an extension of the Brockville and Ottawa Railway opened to Sand Point making it the terminus. Senator Asa Belknap Foster built an extension from Sand Point to Renfrew that opened 4 December 1872, subsequently acquired by the Canadian Pacific Railway. At one point Sand Point contained a hotel, a dance hall, a general store, and a post office.

== Sand Point Ferry Norvic ==
For decades Sand Point was the Ontario terminus of the Sand Point, Ontario-Norway Bay, Quebec ferry which provided access to the CPR and Arnprior. From 1923 to 1963 the eight car ferry, Norvic, landed at the Norway Bay Wharf. The Norvic was originally owned by Colonel Courtney, and her father-in-law James Young, both of Ottawa, with Dudley Gamble as manager. The ferry was sold in 1963 to Mr. Charles Bond of the Bond Marina at Manotick, Ontario. Mr. Gamble who owned the ferry paid the wharfage fees charged each year by the federal government. Gamble died in 1966. The ferry has been revived as a tour boat in the 1000 Islands system. The boat was the successor to the old Norway Belle destroyed by ice when it was pushed off the Norway Bay wharf in 1919. The "Norvic" derived its name from its home harbor, Norway Bay, and its builders, Vicker's Marine of Montreal. Seventy two feet long with a beam of twenty two feet, solid steel hull with diesel engine, built in 1922.Some of the captains who sailed the Norvic were Captains Charier and Fleming, Dudley Gamble, the Bailey brothers, Jack, George and Lincoln and Jim McKnight.

The Norvic, had a distinct and unique bow and stern shape. In approximately 2003, the distinct hull of the boat was sited as the base of a refurbished yacht tied up at a marina on the Ottawa River near Rideau Falls. The boat was refurbished by Ottawa developer Bill Teron and relaunched in 1989.

== Sand Point Golf Club ==
In 1924 several Arnprior residents began construction of a golf course and club on the hill above Sand Point where it remains a mainstay of the community. In 2018 the golf club was sold, and renamed as "Sand Point Golf Club".

== Algonquin Trail ==
In 2018 the former railbed was converted into a recreational multi use trail for pedestrians, snowmobiles, horses and ATVs. The trail connects Arnprior with Renfrew, Ontario via Braeside, Sand Point and Castleford. Users are advised to limit their speeds to 20 km/h when going through Sand Point by a new sign installed in 2020

== Rhoddy's Bay ==
Rhoddy's Bay just west of Sand Point along the River Road is a popular summer cottage destination with great beaches and sandy river bottoms.

There is a Little Free Library on Sullivan's Point in the community. This small structure is open to anyone to donate, and borrow books within Rhoddy's Bay

== Rail accident ==
On February 9, 1904, Canadian Pacific train 7 collided head on with Canadian Pacific train 8 about two miles west of Sand Point. Thirteen people were killed:

- Joseph Jackson, engineer, Ottawa
- W. Mullen, newsagent, Montreal
- Robert Thompson, express messenger, Montreal
- John O'Toole, baggageman, Ottawa
- Ernest Dubois, firefighter, Hochelaga
- Nelson Robertson, express manager, Montreal
- Joseph Chalu
- Dolphis Seguin
- J. Carriere
- M. LeBrun
- William Pouilotte, Whitney, Ontario
- two unidentified persons
