= Braeside, Ontario =

Coordinates: 45.465818°N 76.406965°W

Braeside is an unincorporated community in Ontario, Canada. It is recognized as a designated place by Statistics Canada.

== Demographics ==
In the 2021 Census of Population conducted by Statistics Canada, Braeside had a population of 203 living in 86 of its 89 total private dwellings, a change of 6.8% from its 2016 population of 190. With a land area of 1.85 km^{2} (0.71 sq mi), it had a population density of 109.7/km^{2} (284.2/sq mi) in 2021.

== See also ==
- List of communities in Ontario
- List of designated places in Ontario
