= Tuohy =

Tuohy (/ˈtuːi/) is an Irish surname, derived from the Gaelic "Ó Tuathaigh", meaning "descendant of Tuathach", a personal name referring to a ruler or chieftain.

Notable people with the surname include:

- Dan Tuohy (born 1985), Irish rugby player
- Denis Tuohy (born 1937), television broadcaster, actor, newsreader, and journalist
- Edward Tuohy (1908–1959), inventor of the Tuohy needle
- John S. Tuohy, brigadier general in the United States Air Force
- Katelyn Tuohy (born 2002) high school distance running record holder
- Leigh Anne Tuohy (born 1960), American businesswoman and interior decorator, portrayed in the film The Blind Side
- Liam Tuohy (footballer) (born 1933), Irish footballer and manager
- Owen Tuohy (1921–2007), Irish fencer
- Patrick Tuohy (1894–1930), Irish painter
- Sean Tuohy (born c. 1960), American sports commentator, restaurateur and former college basketball player, husband of Leigh Anne Tuohy
- Tom Tuohy (1917–2008), noted for putting out a major fire in Britain's worst nuclear accident
- William Tuohy, American Pulitzer Prize–winning journalist and author
- Zach Tuohy (born 1989), Australian rules football player

== See also ==
- Tooey (disambiguation)
- Touhy (disambiguation)
