= McNab/Braeside =

- Township (lower-tier)
- Township of McNab/Braeside
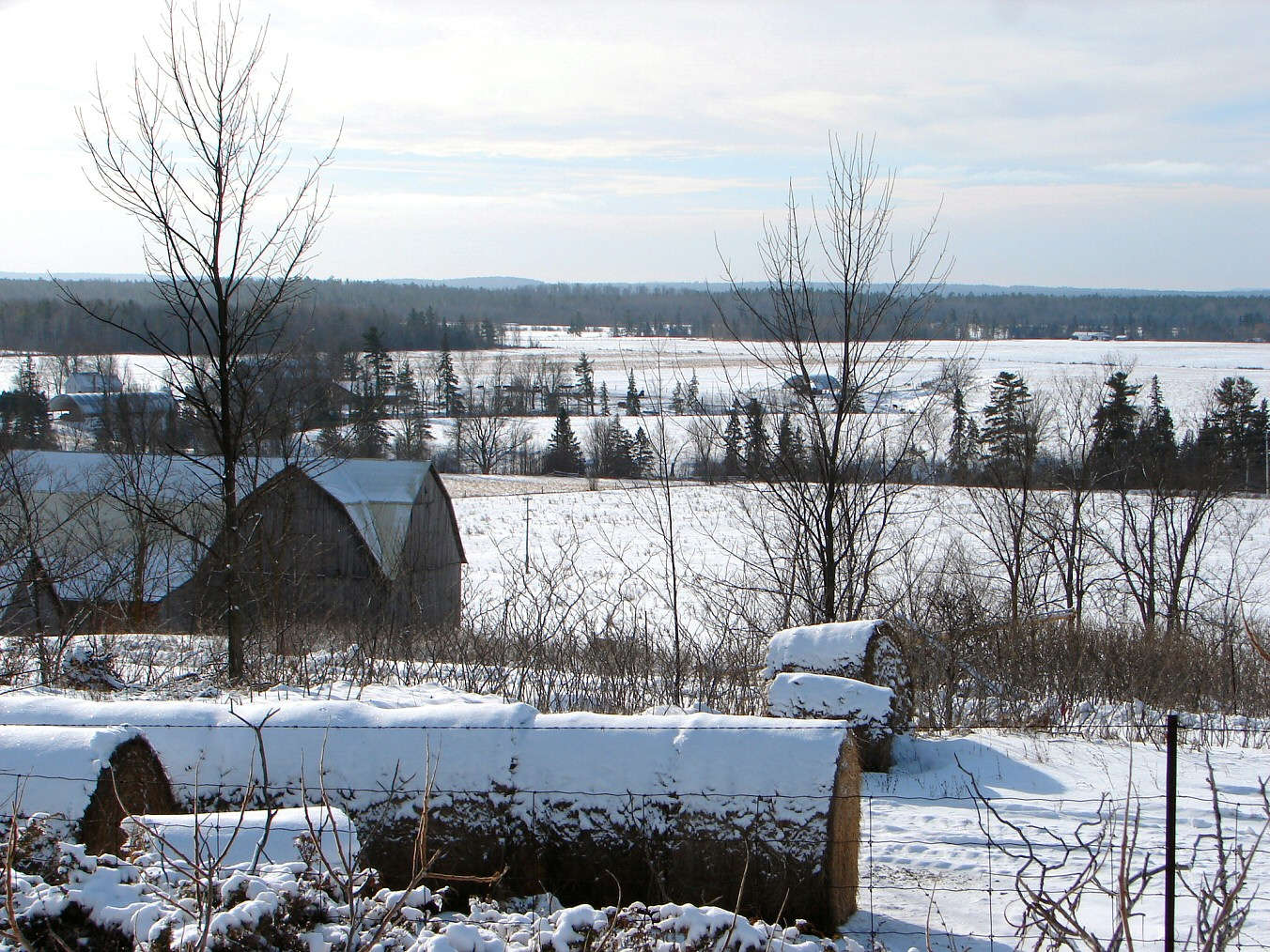
- Countryside near Braeside.
- Motto: "Where Nature Awaits"
- Location within Renfrew County Location within Southern Ontario
- Coordinates: 45°27′N 76°30′W
- Country: Canada
- Province: Ontario
- County: Renfrew
- Incorporation: January 1, 1998

Government
  - Type: Township
  - Mayor: Lori Hoddinott

Area
  - Land: 255.28 km^{2} (98.56 sq mi)

Population (2021)
  - Total: 7,591
  - Density: 29.7/km^{2} (77/sq mi)
- Time zone: UTC−5 (EST)
  - Summer (DST): UTC−4 (EDT)
- Area codes: 613, 343
- Website: www.mcnabbraeside.com

McNab/Braeside is a township in eastern Ontario, Canada, on the south shore of Chats Lake (part of the Ottawa River), straddling the lower Madawaska River in Renfrew County. The township was created on January 1, 1998, when the Village of Braeside amalgamated with McNab Township.

== History ==
McNab township was created in 1825, comprising roughly 80,000 acres of unsettled land, covering the current Town of Arnprior and Township of McNab/Braeside. It was granted by the government ("Family Compact") to Archibald 13th Laird of McNab (1779-1860), who had fled from his debts in Scotland. He promised to settle it with Highland clansmen, and the first group of eighty-four settlers arrived the same year, 1825. McNab ruled with an iron fist over the Scottish settlers. Only after eighteen years of petitions, court battles, and appeals was his grip loosened when the government finally began issuing Crown grants to the settlers. His feudal powers removed, the Laird eventually sold his lands to the government and returned to Europe in 1852, never to return.

Braeside was named in 1872 by W.J. McDonald probably for Braeside, Greenock in Inverclyde, Scotland.

== Communities ==
In addition to the main town of Braeside, the township also comprises the communities of Burnstown, Clay Bank, Clay Valley, Dewars, Glasgow Station, Goshen, Lochwinnoch (partially), Lundys Corners, Pine Grove, Sand Point, Stewartville, Rhoddy’s Bay, Waba and White Lake.

Burnstown village is located about 53 miles (85 km) from downtown Ottawa using Highway 417.

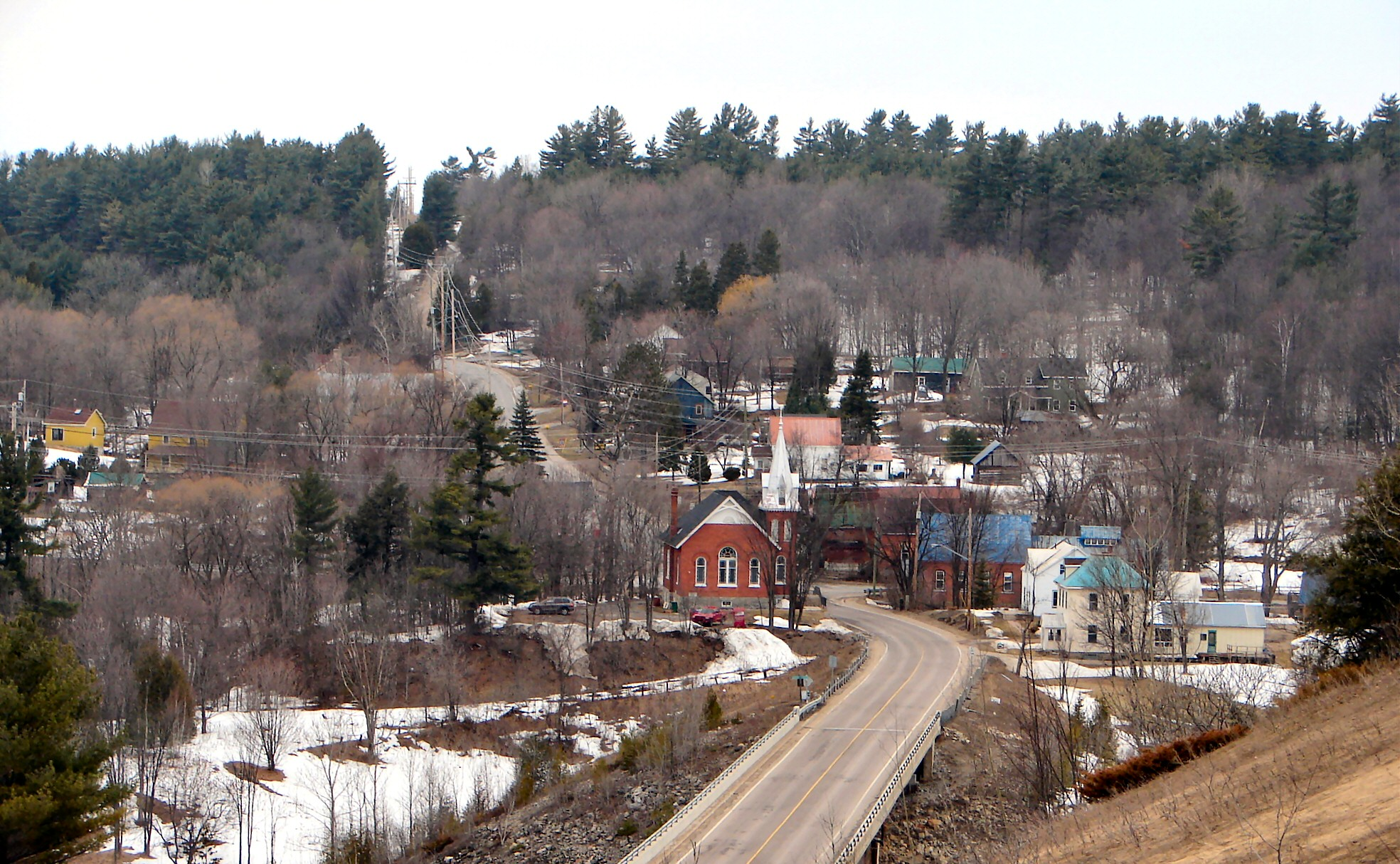
Burnstown

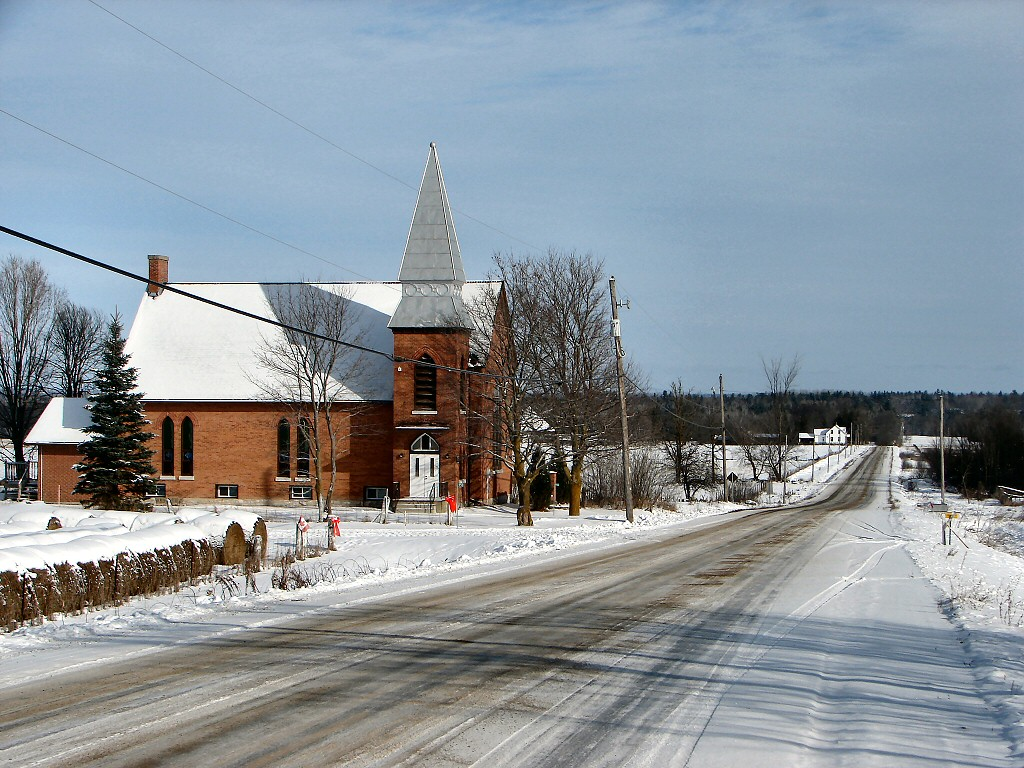
Lochwinnoch

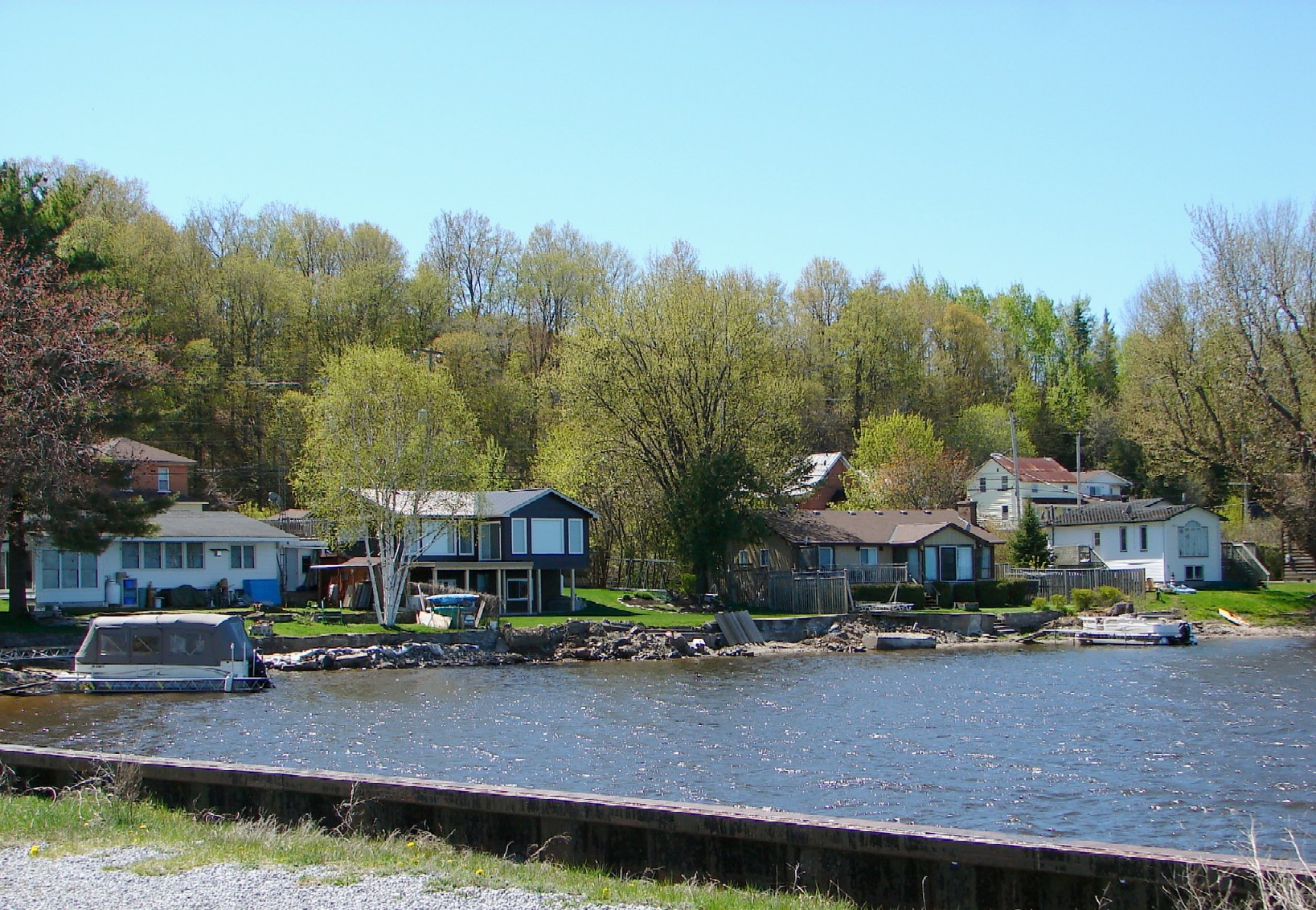
Sand Point

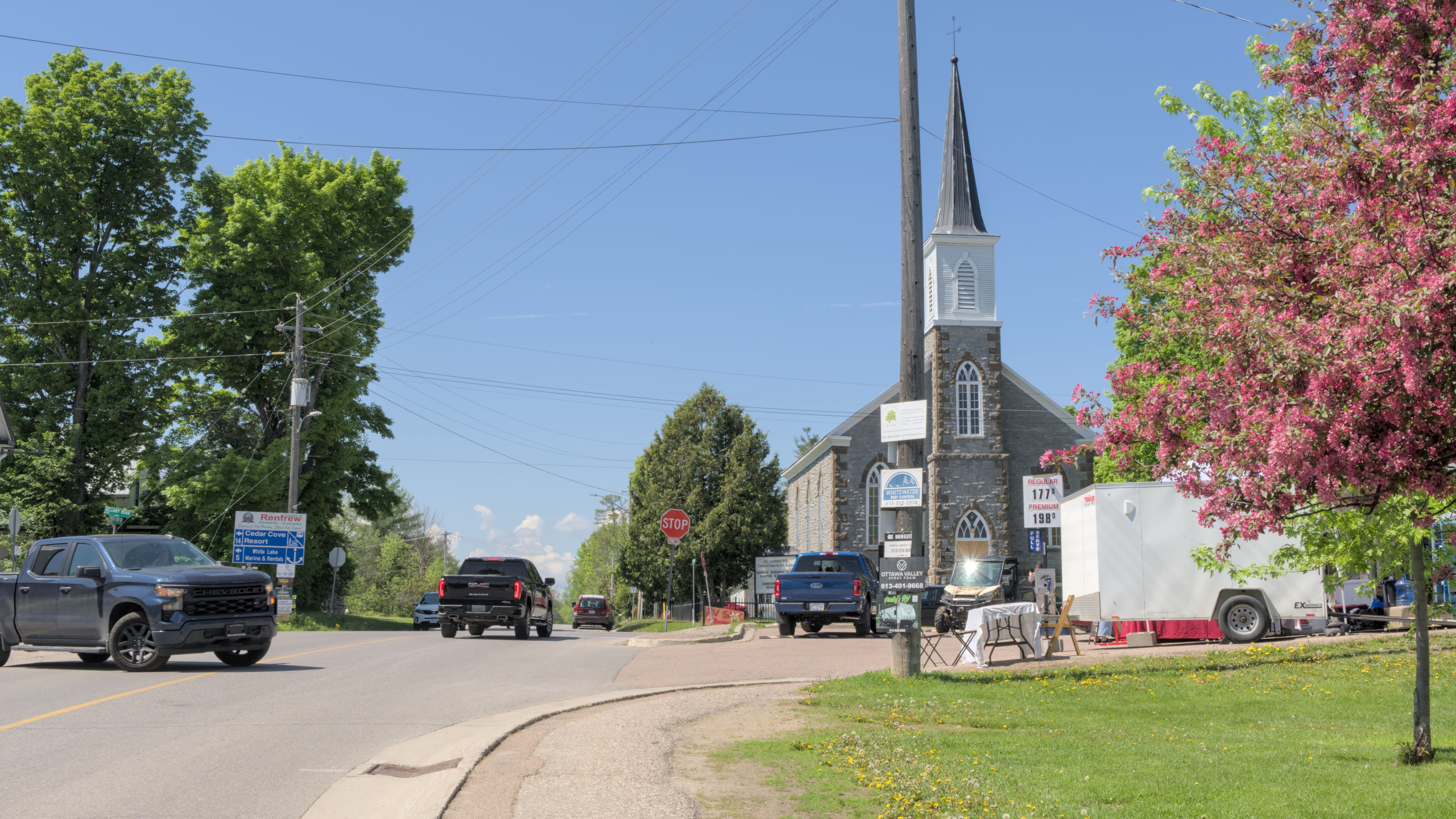
White Lake

== Demographics ==
In the 2021 Census of Population conducted by Statistics Canada, McNab/Braeside had a population of 7,591 living in 3,036 of its 3,235 total private dwellings, an increase of 5.8% from its 2016 population of 7,178. With a land area of 255.28 km^{2} (98.56 sq mi), it had a population density of 29.7/km^{2} (77.0/sq mi) in 2021.

Historical census populations – McNab/Braeside

Year	Pop.	±%
1996	6,480	—
2001	6,843	+5.6%
2006	7,222	+5.5%

Year	Pop.	±%
2011	7,371	+2.1%
2016	7,178	−2.6%
2021	7,591	+5.8%

Source: Statistics Canada

Canada census – McNab/Braeside community profile

	2021	2016	2011
Population	7,591 (+5.8% from 2016)	7,178 (-2.6% from 2011)	7,371 (2.1% from 2006)
Land area	255.28 km^{2} (98.56 sq mi)	255.76 km^{2} (98.75 sq mi)	255.74 km^{2} (98.74 sq mi)
Population density	29.7/km^{2} (77/sq mi)	28.1/km^{2} (73/sq mi)	28.8/km^{2} (75/sq mi)
Median age	48.0 (M: 46.8, F: 48.4)	47.5 (M: 46.9, F: 48.1)
Private dwellings	3,235 (total) 3,036 (occupied)	3,125 (total) 2,884 (occupied)	3,061 (total)
Median household income	$99,000	$81,067

References: 2021 2016 2011

== Local government ==
List of former mayors:

- Mary M. Campbell (2006–2014)
- Tom Peckett (2014–2022)
- Mark MacKenzie (2022–2025)
- Lori Hoddinott (2025–present)

In December 2023, the township's council voted to suspend Mayor Mackenzie's pay for 60 days following a report by the integrity commissioner that found Mackenzie had threatened and intimidated both staff and council colleagues. On April 16, 2024, Mackenzie decided to suspend himself for 60 days, stating he is no longer comfortable being the face of the township.

== Notable people ==
- D'Alton Corry Coleman (1879–1956), president of the Canadian Pacific Railway
- Dean Letourneau (born 2006), ice hockey player

== See also ==
- List of townships in Ontario
