= Renfrew County Council =

Renfrew County Council is the governing body of the upper-tier municipality of Renfrew County in Ontario, Canada. This 17-member body is responsible for the government providing services to a population of 97,000.

== Election ==
Members of council are indirectly elected, as the council is made up the reeves and mayors of the lower-tier municipalities within Renfrew County, including the reeves (rather than mayors) of Arnprior, Deep River, Renfrew, Laurentian Valley and Whitewater Region. The head of County Council is styled as "Warden" and like in all other municipalities in Ontario, has "weak mayor" powers. The Warden is selected by vote of council, and is therefore doubly indirectly elected.

== Current council ==
Position	Officeholder
Mayor of Admaston Bromley	Michael Donohue
Reeve of Arnprior	Walter Stack
Mayor of Bonnechere Valley	Jennifer Murphy*
Mayor of Brudenell, Lyndoch and Raglan	Sheldon Keller
Reeve of Deep River	Glenn Doncaster
Reeve of Greater Madawaska	Glenda McKay
Mayor of Head, Clara and Maria	Robert Reid
Mayor of Horton	Robert Kingsbury
Mayor of Killaloe, Hagarty and Richards	Janice Visneskie Moore
Mayor of Laurentian Hills	John Reinwald
Reeve of Laurentian Valley	Debbie Robinson
Mayor of Madawaska Valley	Kim Love
Mayor of McNab/Braeside	Tom Peckett
Mayor of North Algona Wilberforce	Deborah Farr
Mayor of Petawawa	Bob Sweet
Reeve of Renfrew	Peter Emon
Reeve of Whitewater Region	Terry Millar

*Warden of County Council
