= Brudenell, Lyndoch and Raglan =

- Township (lower-tier)
- Township of Brudenell, Lyndoch and Raglan
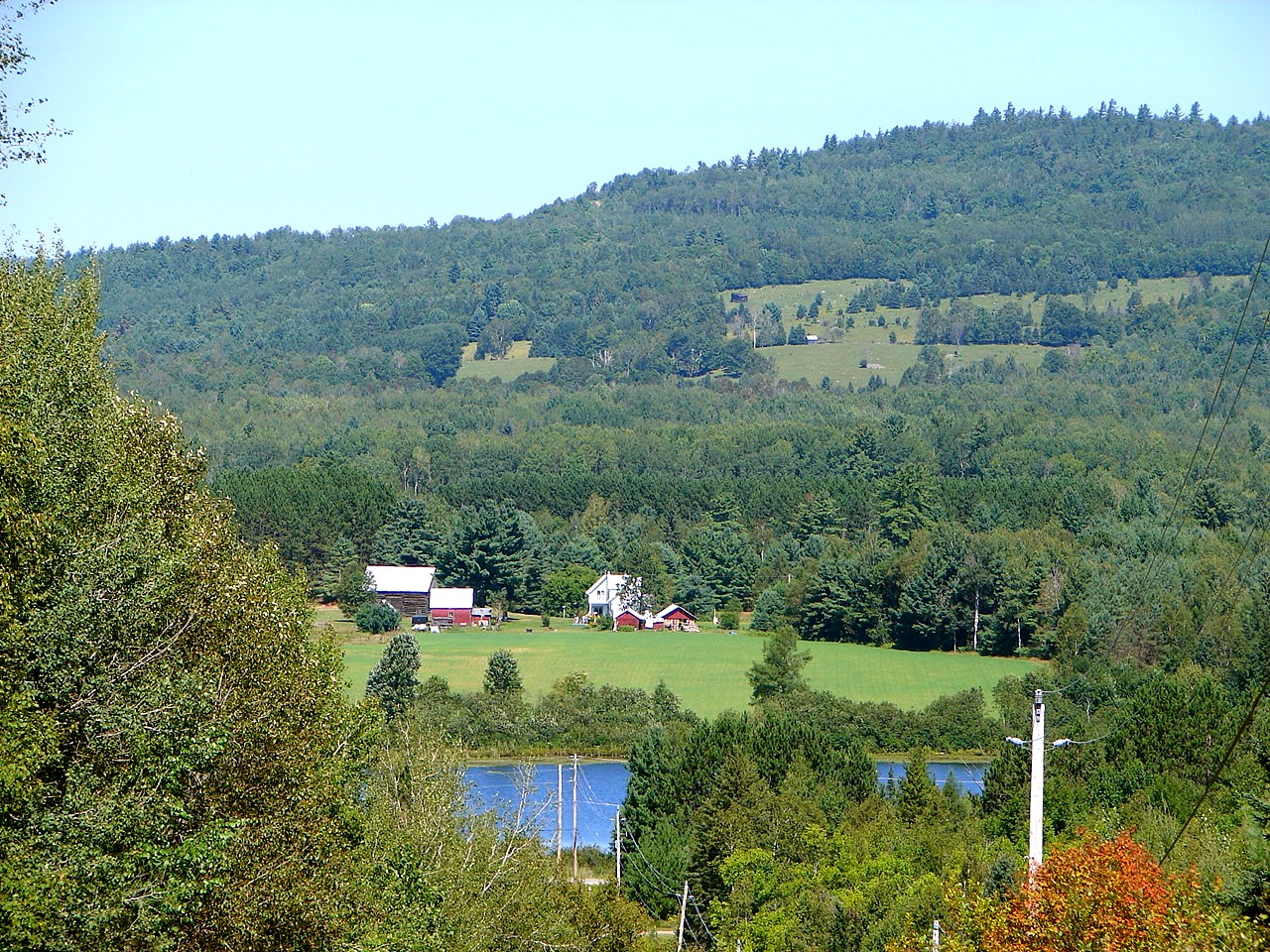
- Near Latchford Bridge

- Location within Renfrew County Location within Southern Ontario
- Coordinates: 45°19′N 77°24′W
- Country: Canada
- Province: Ontario
- County: Renfrew
- Established: January 1, 2000

Government
  - Mayor: Valerie Jahn
  - Federal riding: Algonquin—Renfrew—Pembroke
  - Prov. riding: Renfrew—Nipissing—Pembroke

Area
  - Land: 701.29 km^{2} (270.77 sq mi)

Population (2021)
  - Total: 1,552
  - Density: 2.2/km^{2} (5.7/sq mi)
- Time zone: UTC-5 (EST)
  - Summer (DST): UTC-4 (EDT)
- Postal Code FSA: K0J
- Area codes: 613, 343
- Website: www.blrtownship.ca

Brudenell, Lyndoch and Raglan is a township in Renfrew County, Ontario, Canada. It was formed on January 1, 1999, through the merger of Brudenell and Lyndoch Township with Raglan Township.

== Communities ==
The township comprises the smaller communities of Bruceton, Brudenell, Copp, Hardwood Lake, Harriets Corners, Jewellville, Latchford Bridge, Letterkenny, Lost Nation, Palmer Rapids, Quadeville, Rockingham, Schutt, Wingle and Wolfe.

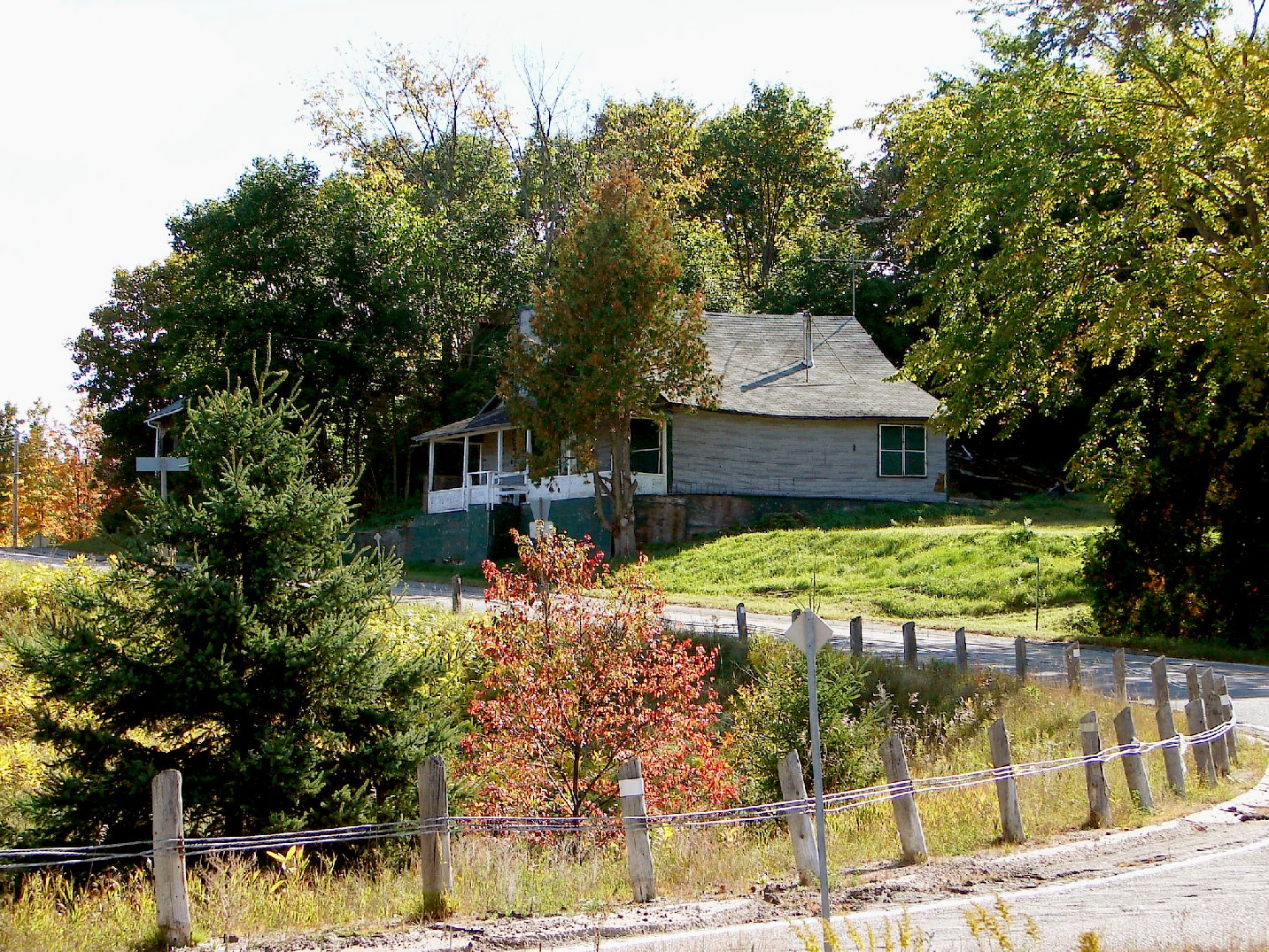
Brudenell

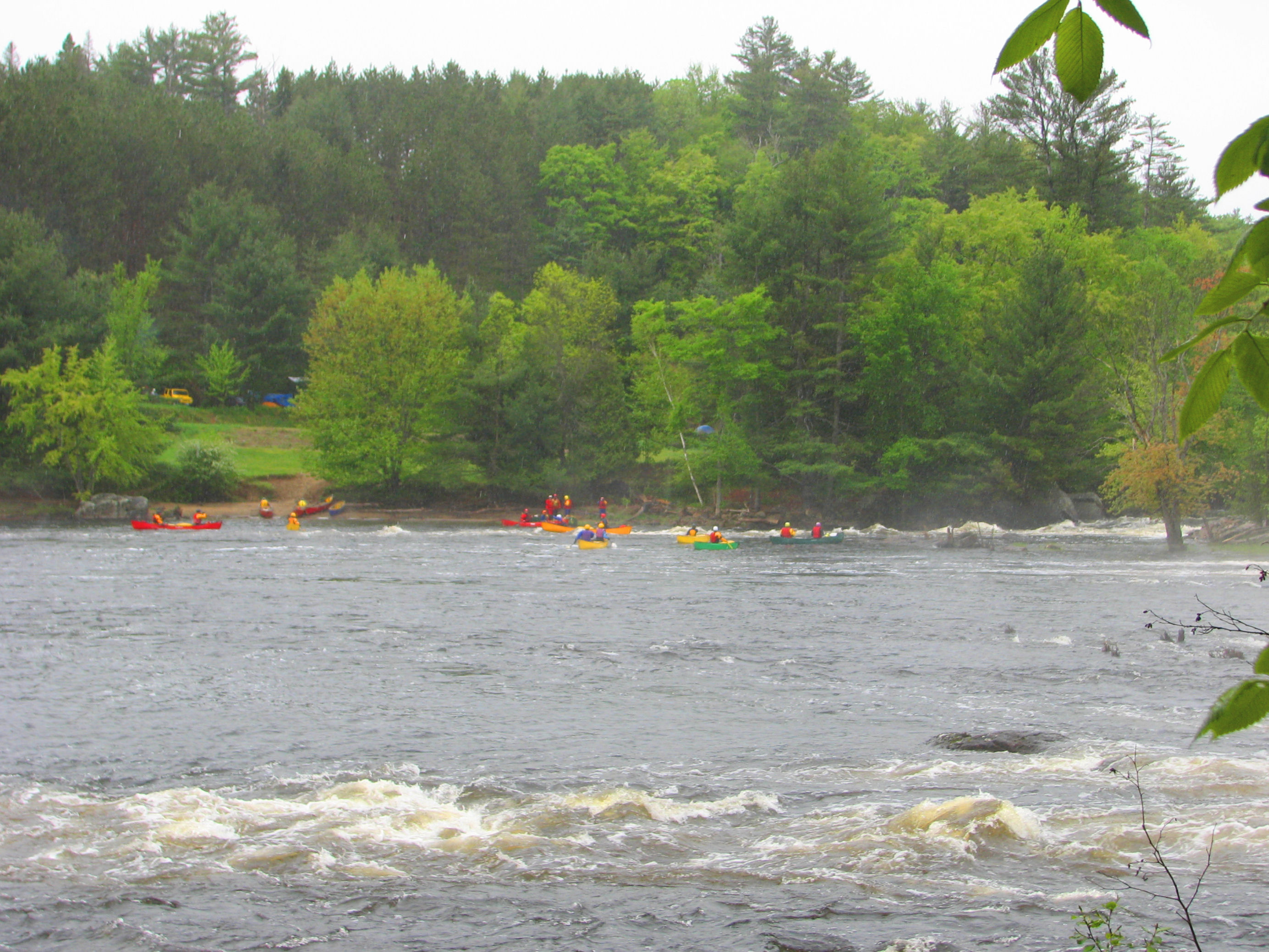
The Madawaska River at Palmer Rapids.

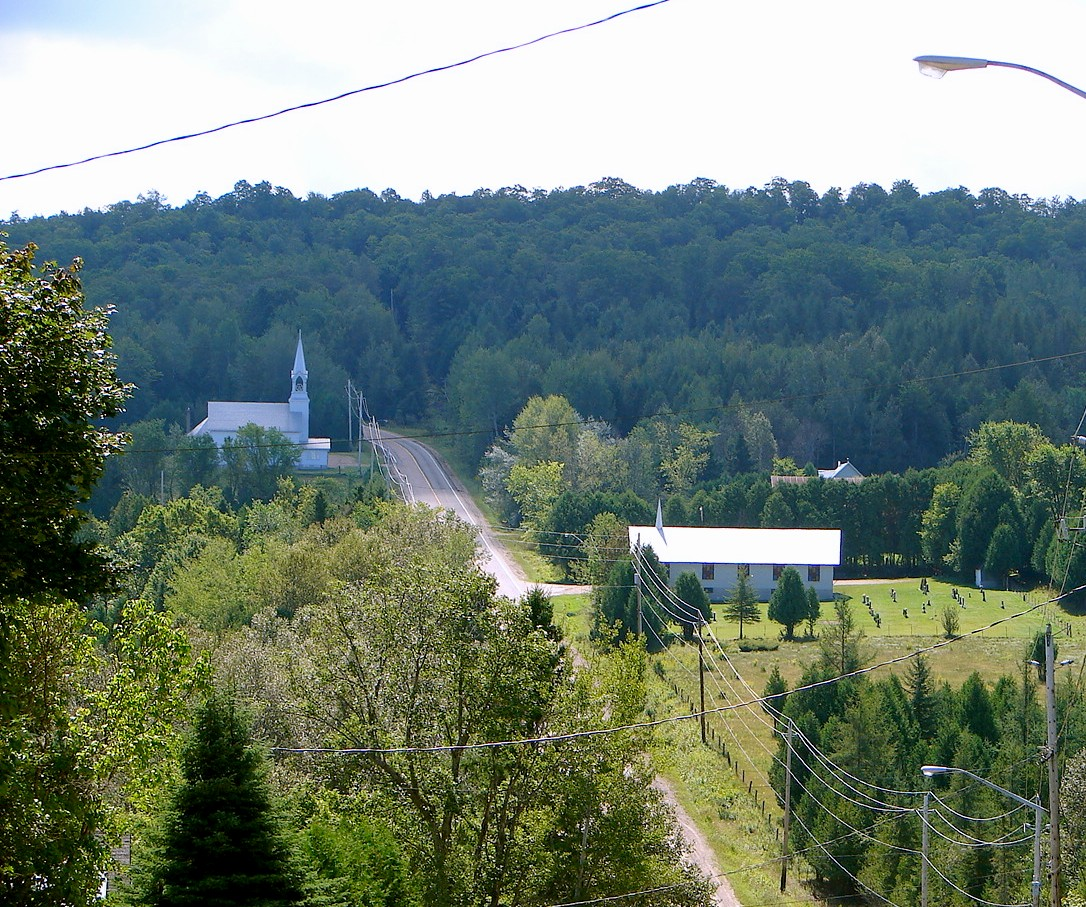
Schutt

== Demographics ==
In the 2021 Census of Population conducted by Statistics Canada, Brudenell, Lyndoch and Raglan had a population of 1,552 living in 694 of its 998 total private dwellings, a change of 3.3% from its 2016 population of 1,503. With a land area of 701.29 km^{2} (270.77 sq mi), it had a population density of 2.2/km^{2} (5.7/sq mi) in 2021.

Canada census – Brudenell, Lyndoch and Raglan community profile

	2021	2016	2011
Population	1,552 (+3.3% from 2016)	1,503 (-9.3% from 2011)	1,658 (10.8% from 2006)
Land area	701.29 km^{2} (270.77 sq mi)	706.24 km^{2} (272.68 sq mi)	705.83 km^{2} (272.52 sq mi)
Population density	2.2/km^{2} (5.7/sq mi)	2.1/km^{2} (5.4/sq mi)	2.3/km^{2} (6.0/sq mi)
Median age	55.6 (M: 56.0, F: 55.6)	53.5 (M: 54.0, F: 52.8)
Private dwellings	998 (total) 694 (occupied)	963 (total)	1031 (total)
Median household income	$62,000	$51,072

References: 2021 2016 2011

Mother tongue (2021):

- English as first language: 92.3%
- French as first language: 1.6%
- English and French as first language: 0%
- Other as first language: 5.2%

Historical census populations – Brudenell, Lyndoch and Raglan
Year	Pop.	±%
2001	1,565	—
2006	1,497	−4.3%
2011	1,658	+10.8%
2016	1,502	−9.4%
2021	1,552	+3.3%
Source: Statistics Canada

Historical census populations – Brudenell and Lyndoch Township

Year	Pop.	±%
1921	1,069	—
1931	1,032	−3.5%
1941	1,179	+14.2%
1951	1,073	−9.0%
1956	983	−8.4%
1961	999	+1.6%
1966	907	−9.2%

Year	Pop.	±%
1971	843	−7.1%
1976	825	−2.1%
1981	818	−0.8%
1986	759	−7.2%
1991	778	+2.5%
1996	791	+1.7%

Source: Statistics Canada

Historical census populations – Raglan Township

Year	Pop.	±%
1921	836	—
1931	772	−7.7%
1941	788	+2.1%
1951	789	+0.1%
1956	723	−8.4%
1961	734	+1.5%
1966	642	−12.5%

Year	Pop.	±%
1971	700	+9.0%
1976	787	+12.4%
1981	832	+5.7%
1986	848	+1.9%
1991	837	−1.3%
1996	820	−2.0%

Source: Statistics Canada

== Notable stories ==
"Al Capone's Hideout", an Upper Madawaska Theatre Group production, is a musical comedy based on the story of Al Capone's stay in the area in 1942, when he and his gang allegedly hid out near Quadeville, Ontario.

== See also ==
- List of townships in Ontario
