= Black Donald Lake =

- Location in Southern Ontario
- Location: Renfrew County & Frontenac County, Ontario
- Coordinates: 45°13′01″N 76°56′23″W
- Type: Reservoir
- Part of: Saint Lawrence River drainage basin
- Primary inflows: Madawaska River, Black Donald Creek, Little Black Donald Creek
- Primary outflows: Madawaska River
- Basin countries: Canada
- First flooded: 1966
- Max. length: 12 kilometres (7.5 mi)
- Max. width: 5.5 kilometres (3.4 mi)
- Surface area: 34.4 square kilometres (13.3 sq mi)
- Average depth: 45.7 metres (150 ft)
- Surface elevation: 248 metres (814 ft)
- Settlements: Black Donald

Black Donald Lake is a reservoir lake in the Township of Greater Madawaska, Renfrew County, and the Township of North Frontenac, Frontenac County, in Eastern Ontario, Canada. It is on the Madawaska River and is part of the Saint Lawrence River drainage basin.

The major inflow, at the west, is the Madawaska River, which arrives directly from Centennial Lake at the same elevation as Black Donald Lake. Secondary inflows are Black Donald Creek and Little Black Donald Creek at the centre north. The major outflow is also the Madawaska River, which flows over the dam at the Ontario Power Generation Mountain Chute Generating Station (hydroelectric) to Norcan Lake at the southeast. Norcan Lake drains via the Madawaska River to the Ottawa River to the Saint Lawrence River and thence to the Atlantic Ocean.

The settlement of Black Donald appears in the Natural Resources Canada Place names database and displays as being located on the southeast shore of the lake at the intersection of Chimo Road South and Far Side Lane. In fact, there is no town of Black Donald, at that location or anywhere else. The town of Black Donald was flooded after the construction of Mountain Chute dam and no longer exists.

From the outflow of the lake almost to the major inflow of the Madawaska River from Centennial Lake, Black Donald Lake forms the boundary between Greater Madawaska, Renfrew County and North Frontenac, Frontenac County.

== History ==
Black Donald Lake and Centennial Lake adjacent upstream were created by the construction of the Mountain Chute Generating Station and dam and an associated embankment dam in 1965–1966. Black Donald Lake subsumed the previous White Fish Lake and drowned the former mining community of Black Donald Mines, whose graphite mine by then had been exhausted. The reservoir took six months to fill and flooded 8,500 acres (3,440 ha).

The lake is primarily used for recreation, tourism and cottages.

== Transportation ==
Renfrew County Road 65 skirts the northern and eastern shores of the lake.

Renfrew/Black Donald Lake Water Aerodrome is a water aerodrome on the north shore of the lake.

== Gallery ==
Dams that impound Black Donald Lake
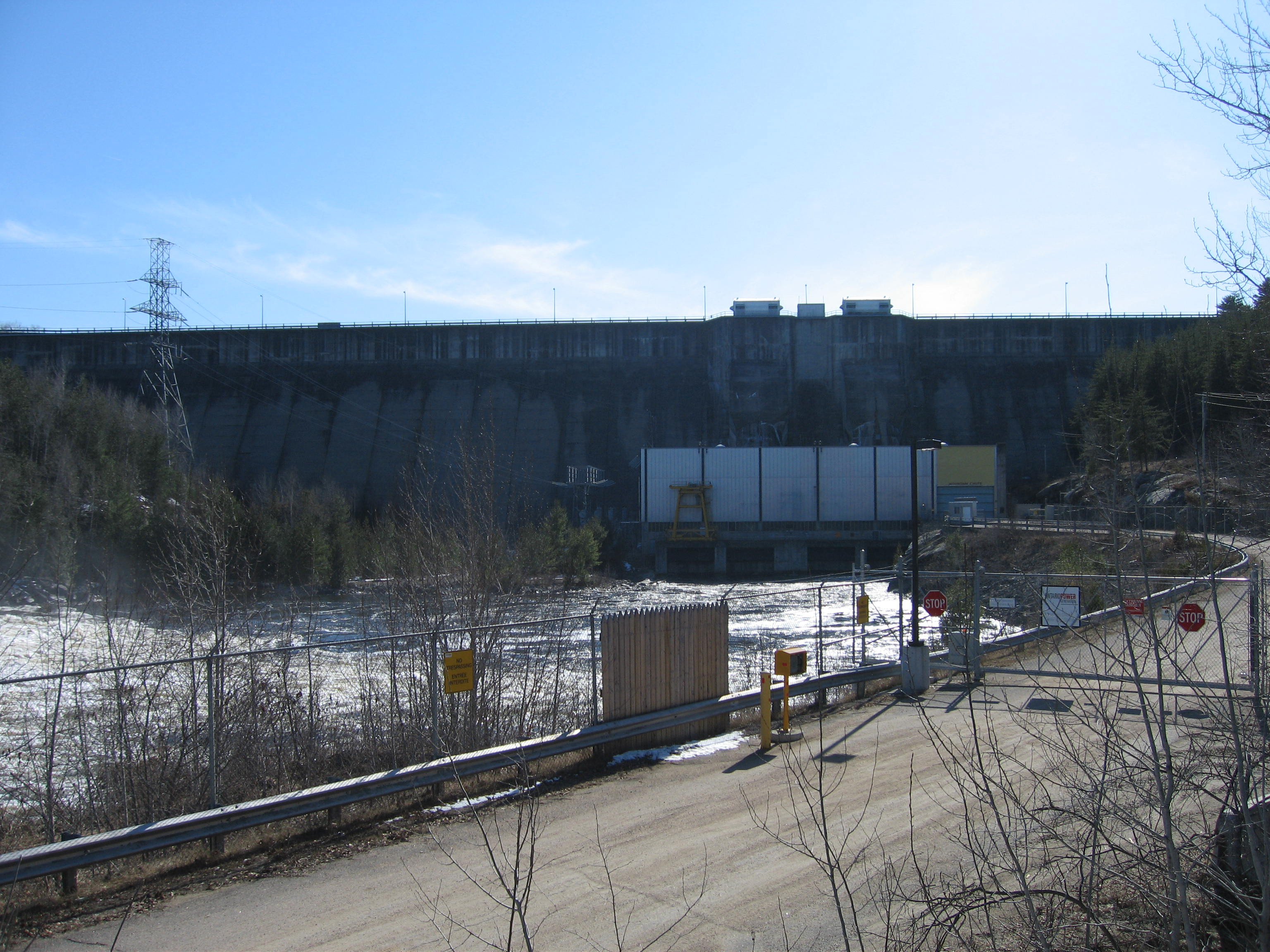
Mountain Chute Dam and Generating Station

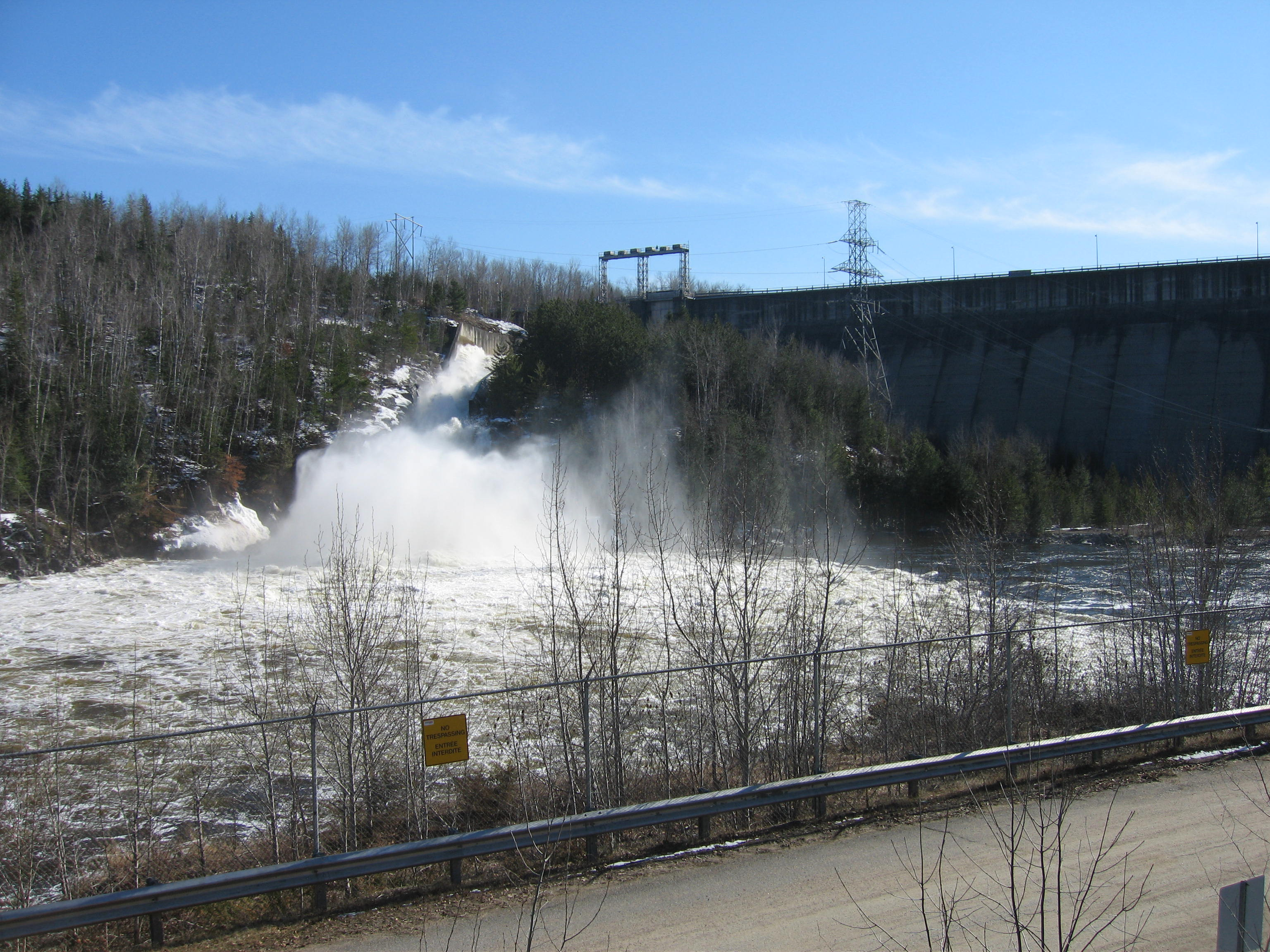
Mountain Chute Dam with spillway sluice gates open

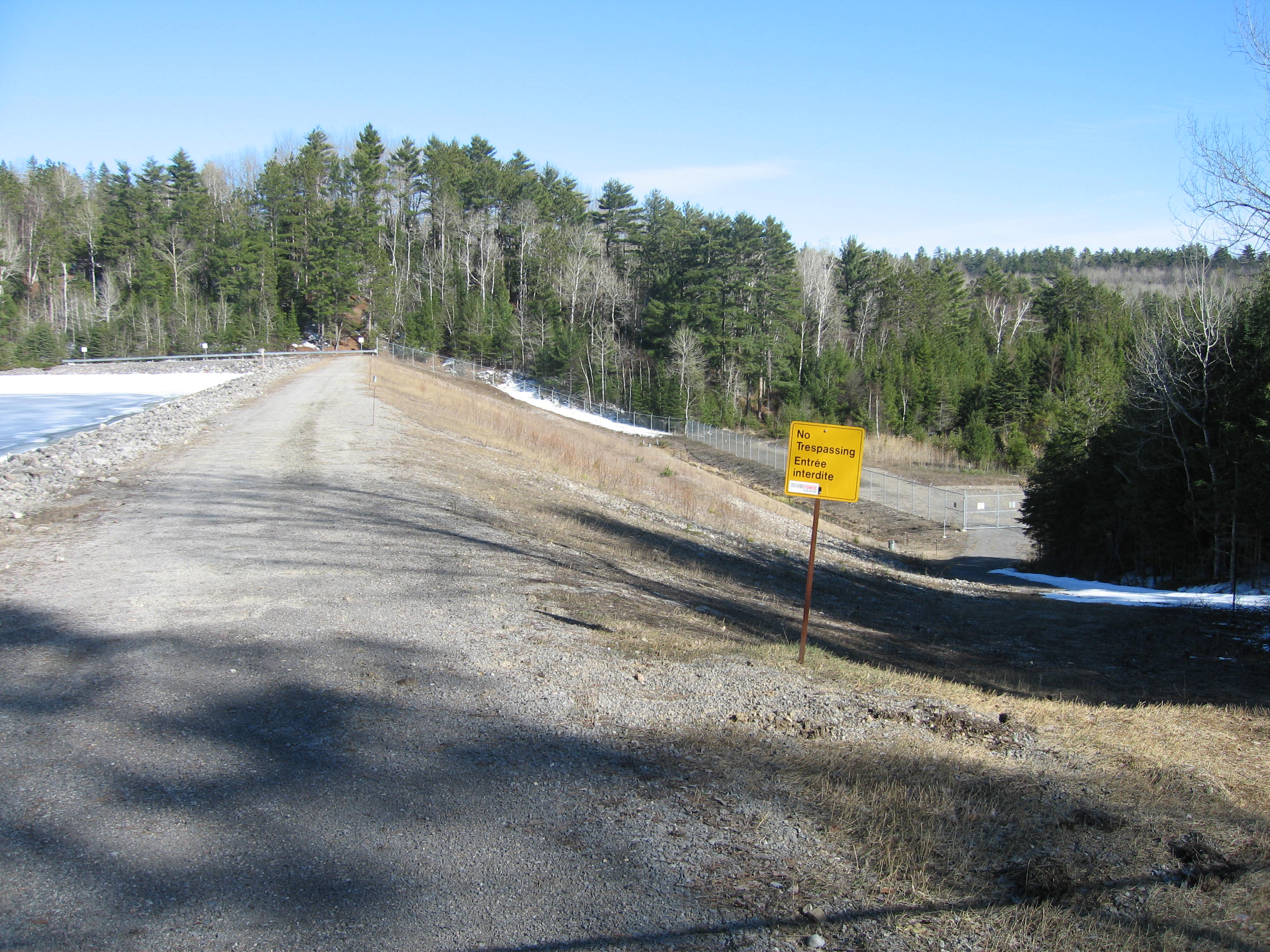
Associated embankment dam nearby

== See also ==
- List of lakes in Ontario
