= Greater Madawaska =

- Township municipality (lower-tier)
- Township of Greater Madawaska
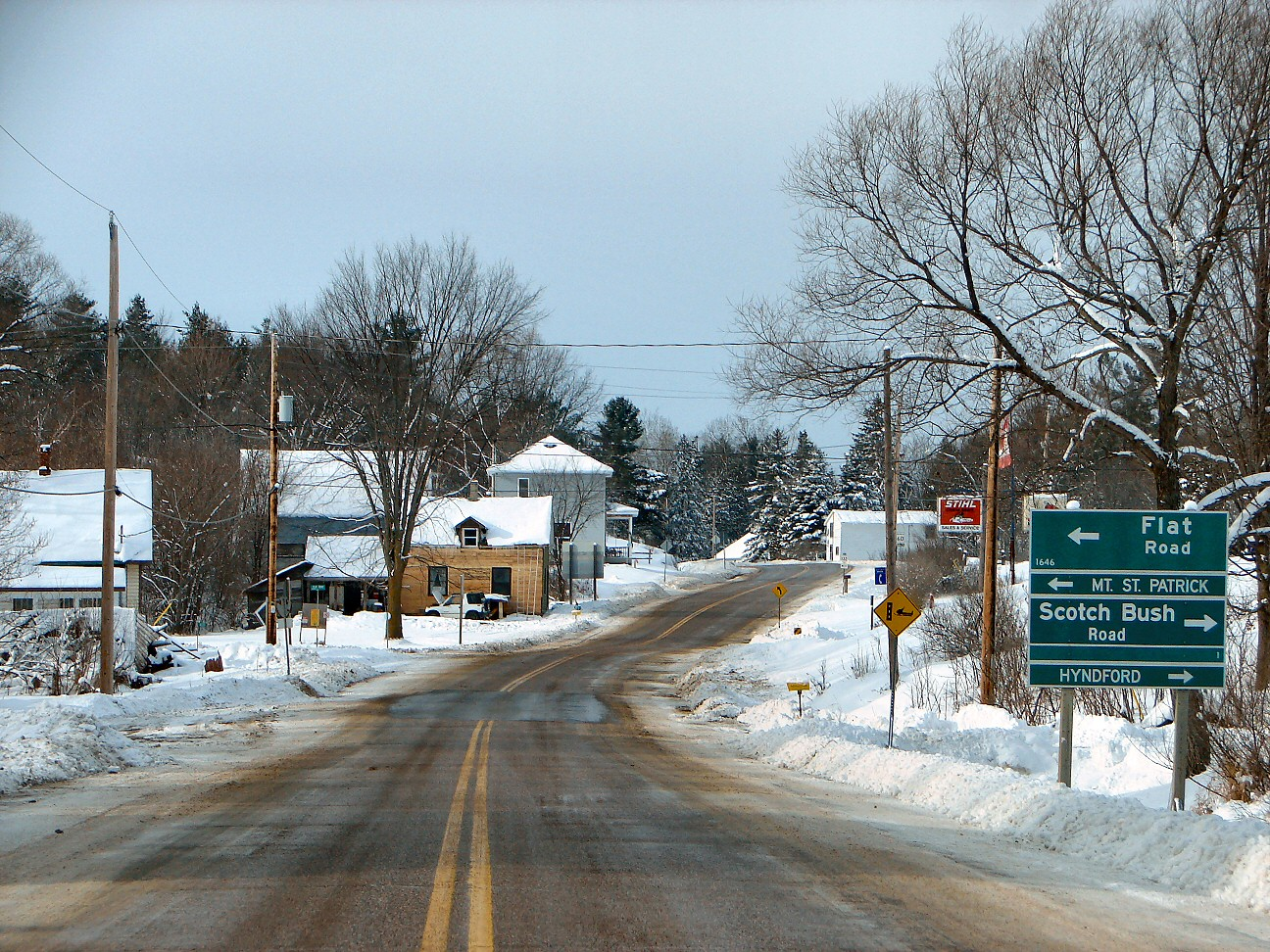
- Dacre, on the northern edge of the township

- Location within Renfrew County Location within Southern Ontario
- Coordinates: 45°16′20″N 76°51′32″W
- Country: Canada
- Province: Ontario
- County: Renfrew
- Formed: January 1, 2001

Government
  - Type: Township
  - Mayor: Rob Weir

Area
  - Land: 1,018.15 km^{2} (393.11 sq mi)

Population (2021)
  - Total: 2,864
  - Density: 2.8/km^{2} (7.3/sq mi)
- Time zone: UTC-5 (EST)
  - Summer (DST): UTC-4 (EDT)
- Area codes: 613, 343
- Website: www.greatermadawaska.com

Greater Madawaska is an incorporated township in Renfrew County in eastern Ontario, Canada, created on January 1, 2001, through the amalgamation of the Township of Bagot and Blythfield, the Township of Brougham, and the Township of Griffith and Matawatchan. As of 2021, it has a population of 2,864.

== Geography ==
The township is composed of the geographic townships of Bagot, Blythfield (also spelled Blithfield), Brougham, Griffith and Matawatchan. The township borders in downstream order Centennial Lake, Black Donald Lake, Norcan Lake and Calabogie Lake, all four on the Madawaska River, and is located in the northern section of the Ottawa River Valley.

=== Communities ===
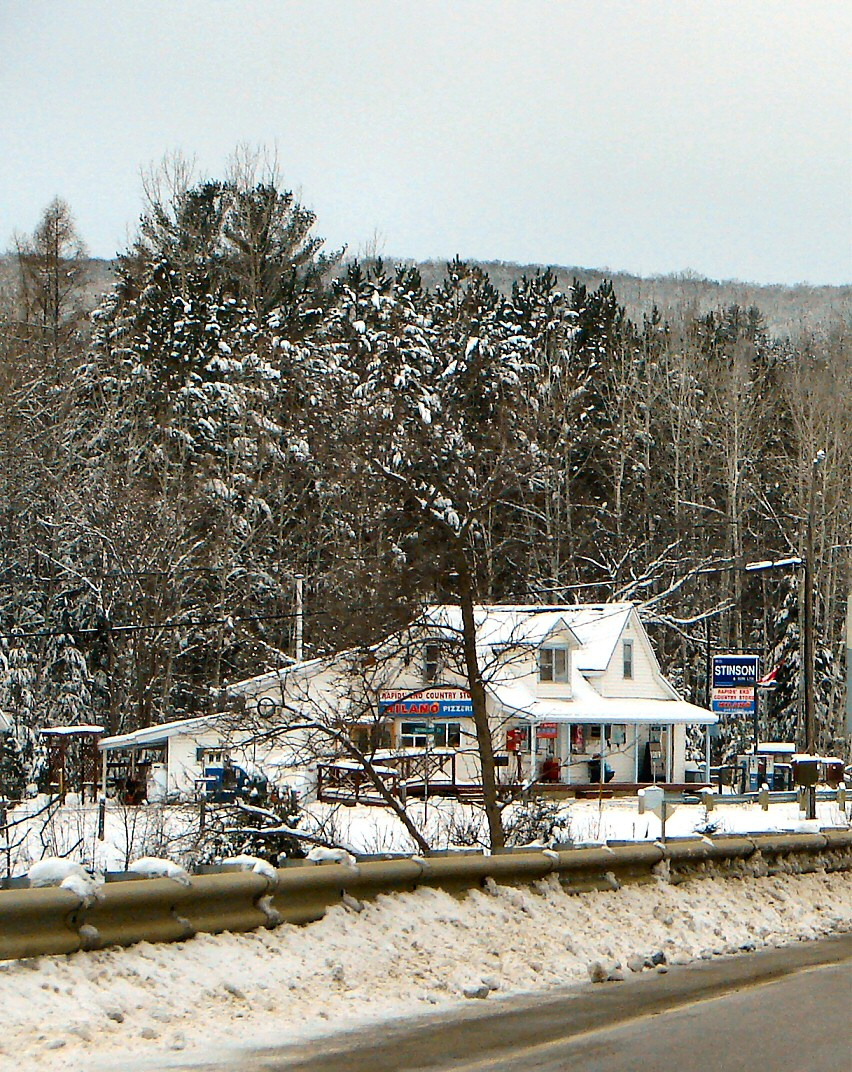
Griffith

The largest communities in the township are the villages of Calabogie and Griffith. The municipal offices are located in Calabogie. Other communities in the township include Ashdad, Barrett Chute, Barryvale, Black Donald, Camel Chute, Hurds Lake, Lower Dacre, Matawatchan, Mount St. Patrick, Springtown, Spruce Hedge and Wilson.

The ghost towns of Khartum and Balvenie are also located in the township.

Two fire towers were located in the township in the middle of the 20th century. These were located at Jameison's Mountain north of Griffith (the cupola now sits on the property of the Pembroke MNR office) and at Matawatchan. These were put out of use in 1970 as aerial forest fire fighting techniques took over.

== Demographics ==
In the 2021 Census of Population conducted by Statistics Canada, Greater Madawaska had a population of 2,864 living in 1,343 of its 2,251 total private dwellings, a change of 13.7% from its 2016 population of 2,518. With a land area of 1,018.15 km^{2} (393.11 sq mi), it had a population density of 2.8/km^{2} (7.3/sq mi) in 2021.

Canada census – Greater Madawaska community profile

	2021	2016	2011
Population	2,864 (+13.7% from 2016)	2,518 (+1.3% from 2011)	2,485 (-9.7% from 2006)
Land area	1,018.15 km^{2} (393.11 sq mi)	1,035.59 km^{2} (399.84 sq mi)	1,034.33 km^{2} (399.36 sq mi)
Population density	2.8/km^{2} (7.3/sq mi)	2.4/km^{2} (6.2/sq mi)	2.4/km^{2} (6.2/sq mi)
Median age	58.8 (M: 58.8, F: 58.8)	57.5 (M: 57.3, F: 57.7)
Private dwellings	2,251 (total) 1,343 (occupied)	2,170 (total) 1,178 (occupied)	2,215 (total)
Median household income	$81,000	$64,768

References: 2021 2016 2011

Historical census populations – Greater Madawaska
Year	Pop.	±%
2001	2,290	—
2006	2,751	+20.1%
2011	2,485	−9.7%
2016	2,518	+1.3%
2021	2,864	+13.7%
Source: Statistics Canada

== Recreation ==
The Calabogie Peaks ski resort is located in the township. The Kingston and Pembroke Railway ran through the town, with stations at Ashdad and Calabogie, until it was abandoned in 1986. It has now become a hiking trail, the K&P Rail Trail. The Calabogie Motorsports Park is a racing venue that hosts regional road racing and is the main circuit in the Ottawa metropolitan area. Calabogie Farmers' Market run on Saturday's from June to September from 9am - 1pm.

== In film ==
- Much of the National Film Board's classic 1968 film The Best Damn Fiddler from Calabogie to Kaladar was shot on farmland around Barryvale.

== See also ==
- List of townships in Ontario
