= Opeongo River Provincial Park =

Provincial park in Ontario, Canada

- IUCN category II (national park)
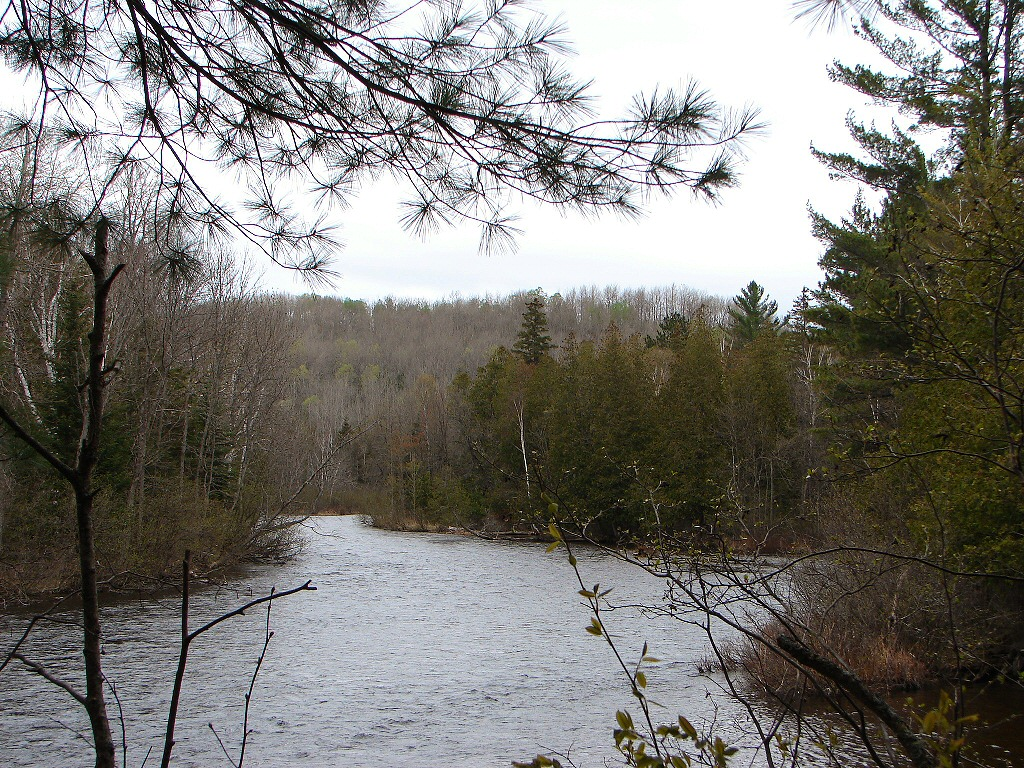

- Location within Southern Ontario
- Location: Nipissing District, Ontario, Canada
- Nearest town: Barry's Bay
- Coordinates: 45°34′54″N 77°53′39″W
- Area: 955.00 ha (2,359.9 acres)
- Designation: Waterway
- Established: 1985
- Governing body: Ontario Parks
- Website: www.ontarioparks.com/park/opeongoriver

Opeongo River Provincial Park is a waterway park in Nipissing District in northeastern Ontario, Canada. It incorporates those portions of the Opeongo River from its exit from Algonquin Provincial Park to the river's mouth at the Madawaska River, except for a small portion around Victoria Lake. The park has two access points: from Ontario Highway 60 west of the community of Madawaska; and the Shall Lake access point, north of Victoria Lake, in Algonquin Provincial Park.

As a non-operating park, there are no facilities or services. The park can be used for recreational activities such as canoeing, hiking, swimming, and hunting.

== Sources ==
- McMurtrie, Jeffrey (2008). "Algonquin Provincial Park and the Haliburton Highlands". Wikimedia Commons. Archived from the original on 2011-06-29.
- Map 9 (PDF) (Map). 1 : 700,000. Official road map of Ontario. Ministry of Transportation of Ontario. 2010-01-01.
