= Owaissa Lake (Algonquin Provincial Park) =

- Location in Ontario
- Location: Nipissing District, Ontario
- Coordinates: 45°40′02″N 78°06′19″W
- Type: Lake
- Part of: Saint Lawrence River drainage basin
- Basin countries: Canada
- Max. length: 340 metres (1,120 ft)
- Max. width: 260 metres (850 ft)
- Surface elevation: 391 metres (1,283 ft)

Owaissa Lake is a lake in geographic Preston Township, Nipissing District in Northeastern Ontario, Canada. It is in Algonquin Provincial Park and is part of the Saint Lawrence River drainage basin.

Owaissa Lake has two unnamed inflows, at the north and southwest. The primary outflow is an unnamed creek at the south, which flows to Shirley Creek. Shirley Creek flows via Crotch Lake, the Opeongo River, the Madawaska River and the Ottawa River to the Saint Lawrence River.

The lake is 2 kilometres (1.2 mi) north of the Shall Lake access point to Algonquin Provincial Park.

== See also ==
- List of lakes in Ontario
