= Renfrew—Nipissing—Pembroke =

Renfrew—Nipissing—Pembroke may refer to:

- Renfrew—Nipissing—Pembroke (federal electoral district)
- Renfrew—Nipissing—Pembroke (provincial electoral district)
