= Opeongo Lake =

Lake in the Saint Lawrence River drainage basin

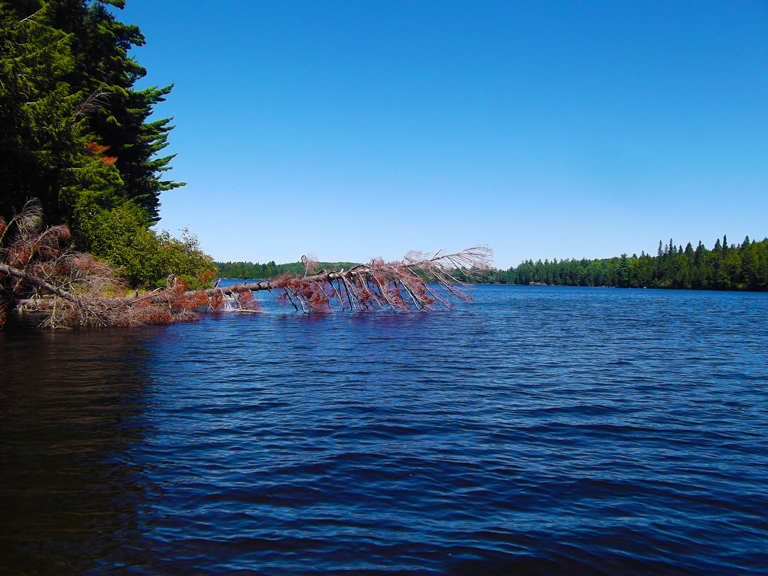

- Location of Opeongo Lake on a map of Southern Ontario
- Location: Nipissing District, Ontario
- Coordinates: 45°42′43″N 78°22′16″W
- Etymology: Algonquian opeauwingauk meaning "sandy narrows"
- Part of: Saint Lawrence River drainage basin
- Primary outflows: Opeongo River
- Basin countries: Canada
- Surface area: 58 km^{2} (22 sq mi)
- Average depth: 14.6 m (48 ft)
- Max. depth: 49.4 m (162 ft)
- Surface elevation: 403 m (1,322 ft)

Opeongo Lake is a lake in the Saint Lawrence River drainage basin in the geographic townships of Bower, Dickson, Preston and Sproule in the Unorganized South Part of Nipissing District in Northeastern Ontario, Canada. It is the largest lake in Algonquin Provincial Park and the source of the Opeongo River. The lake's name comes from the Algonquian word opeauwingauk meaning "sandy narrows".

It has three arms, North, East and South, joined by narrows into a Y shape. The total area is 58 km^{2} (22.4 sq mi), the average depth 14.6 m (48 ft) and the maximum depth 49.4 m (162 ft). The primary outflow is the Opeongo River at the southeast tip of Annie Bay on the East Arm, controlled by the Opeongo Lake Dam, which flows via the Madawaska River to the Ottawa River.

A store with camping supplies and dock, Algonquin access point 11 and the Harkness Laboratory of Fisheries Research are located on Sproule Bay at south end of South Arm and are all accessible from Ontario Highway 60. Consequently, the lake is a popular starting point for canoe trips into the interior of the park.

Opeongo lake was to have been the endpoint of the Opeongo Line, one of a series of settlement roads built to open up this section of the province. It was the endpoint of the Whitney and Opeongo Railway, used for logging operations until the 1920s. Portions of this route now form part of Ontario Highway 60 and the access road connecting the lake to Highway 60.

== Tributaries ==
clockwise from Sproule Bay on the South Arm

- Costello Creek
- Sproule Creek
- Von Creek
- Graham Creek
- Hailstorm Creek
- Happy Isle Creek
- Wright Creek
- Cameron Creek

== See also ==
- List of lakes in Ontario
