= Mayflower (Canadian ship) =

Canadian steam ship

The Mayflower was a Canadian flat-bottom steamer that sank on November 12, 1912. Built in Combermere, Ontario in 1903, the Mayflower was a wooden 77-foot-long ship and was powered by two steam engines that drove a single paddle wheel in her stern.

It was traveling from Barry's Bay to Combermere to deliver the body of John Brown to his brother-in-law (a local Combermere city councillor). On that night, it sank on Kamaniskeg Lake in a winter storm, losing eight lives. Four managed to survive by staying afloat by clinging onto the casket that carried John Brown. Eventually they reached a small island called Gull Island (now known as Parcher Island) and built a fire using the debris and wreckage that had washed ashore. It was reported worldwide at the time by Ripley's Believe it or Not.

This tragedy marked the worst inland maritime disaster in Canadian history at the time. As a result, an island is named after the ship on Kamaniskeg Lake to commemorate it, as well as a floral shop in Barry's Bay.
