= Bark Lake =

Lake in Renfrew County, Ontario, Canada

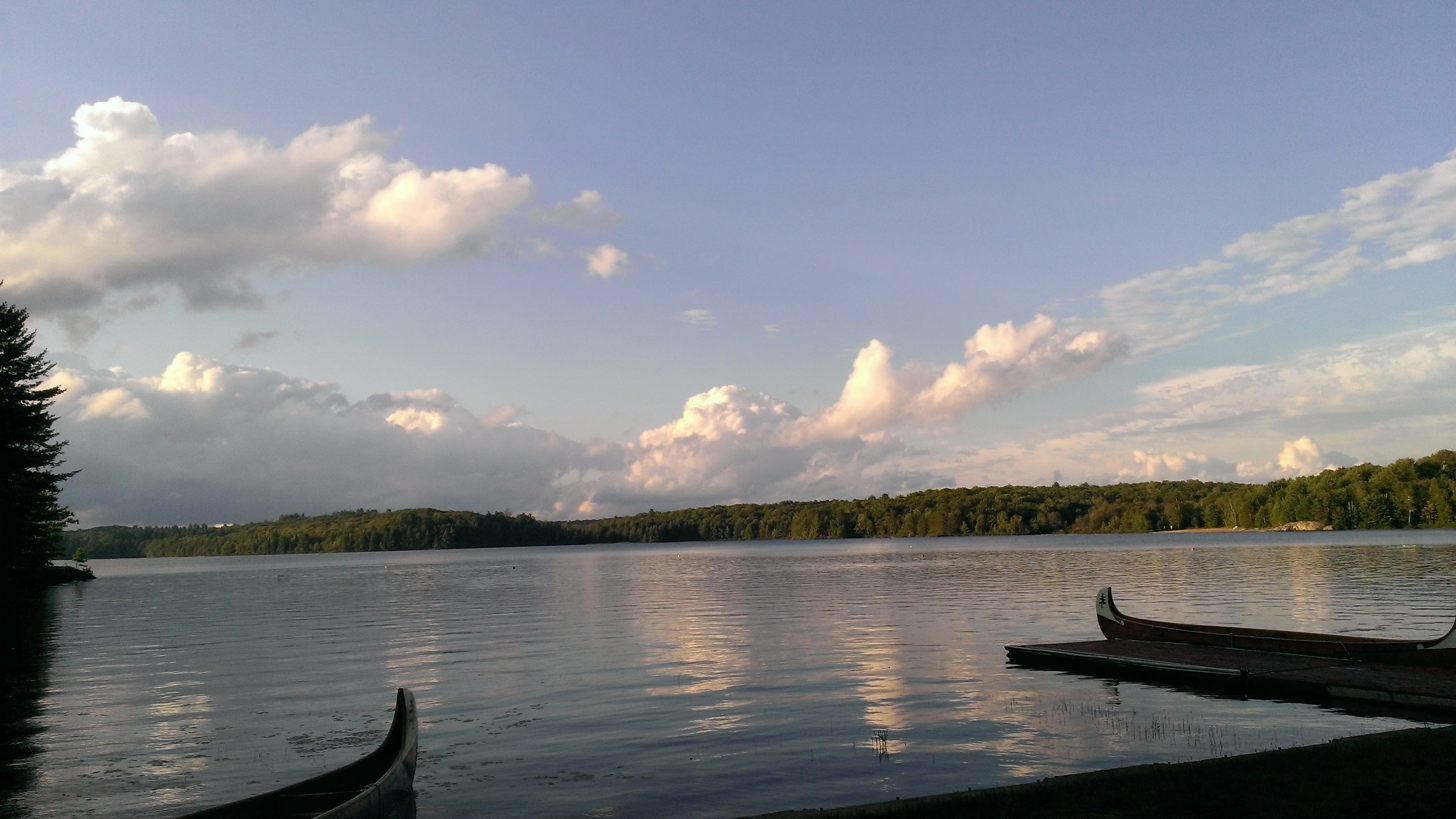

- Location within Ontario
- Location: Madawaska Valley, Township of South Algonquin
- Coordinates: 45°27′N 77°50′W
- Primary inflows: Madawaska River, Opeongo River
- Primary outflows: Madawaska River
- Basin countries: Canada
- Max. length: 14.0 km (8.7 mi)
- Max. width: 6.0 km (3.7 mi)
- Surface elevation: 343 m (1,125 ft) (1970)

Bark Lake is a lake on the border between the Township of Madawaska Valley in Renfrew County and the Township of South Algonquin, in Nipissing District in Ontario, Canada. It lies near Madawaska, Ontario, on the Madawaska River where the tributary Opeongo River joins. The lake is a popular place for fishing.

== Geography ==
Bark Lake is located near Highway 60 and west of Barry's Bay. The Madawaska River flows into the lake, with a dam regulating the flow. Most of the lake remains undeveloped with 90% of the land surrounding it being Crown land. With a few exceptions the rugged shoreline is not conducive to crown Land camping.

Along the northern shores of the lake is Bell Bay Provincial Park.

The lake has a surface area of 168 hectares (415 acres), a mean depth of 4.6 meters (15 feet), a maximum depth of 12.2 metres, and an elevation of 343 meters (1125 feet), all according to a survey taken in July 1970. It is comparable in size to Lake Opeongo in Algonquin Park and the second largest semi -undeveloped Lake surrounded by crown Land in the Ottawa Valley,

== Wildlife ==
Fish species that are located in Bark Lake are Lake trout, Small mouth bass, White sucker, Yellow perch, Lake whitefish, Walleye, and Round whitefish. The shoreline includes cliffs and is characterized by a mixed middle-aged forest of hemlock, maple, birch, poplar and pine. A unique feature is the exceptionally large diameter ( ~ 8 inch dbh ) striped maple (Acer pensylvanicum).

== See also ==
- List of lakes in Ontario
