= John Yakabuski =

Canadian politician

The Honourable John Yakabuski ECO
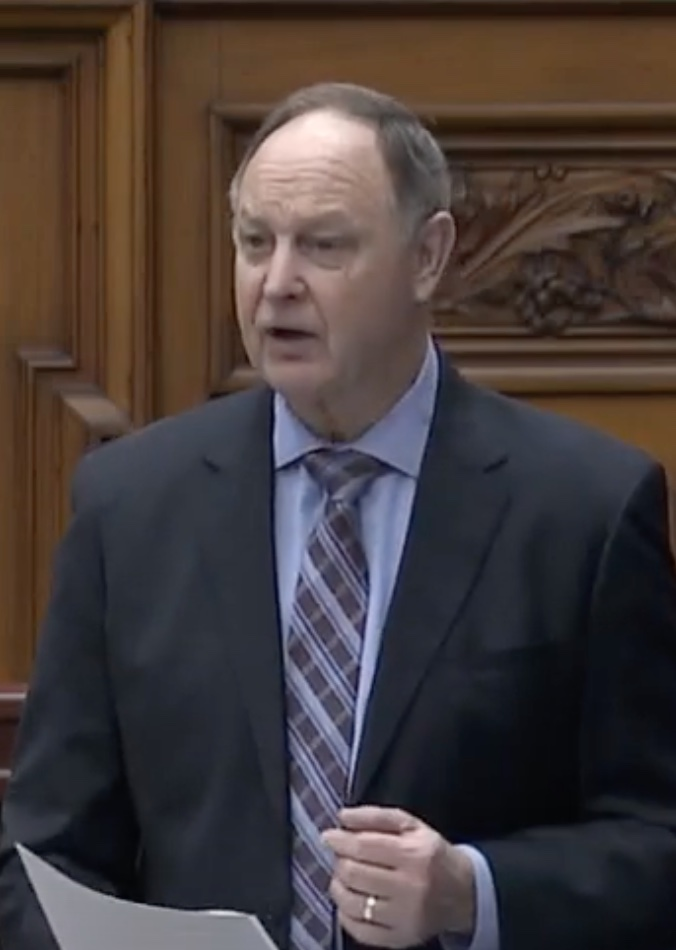
- Yakabuski in 2021

Minister of Natural Resources and Forestry
- In office November 5, 2018 – June 18, 2021
- Premier: Doug Ford
- Preceded by: Jeff Yurek
- Succeeded by: Greg Rickford

Minister of Transportation
- In office June 29, 2018 – November 5, 2018
- Premier: Doug Ford
- Preceded by: Kathryn McGarry
- Succeeded by: Jeff Yurek

Member of the Ontario Provincial Parliament for Renfrew—Nipissing—Pembroke
- In office October 2, 2003 – January 28, 2025
- Preceded by: Sean Conway
- Succeeded by: Billy Denault

Personal details
- Born: June 14, 1957 (age 69) Barry's Bay, Ontario, Canada
- Party: Progressive Conservative
- Spouse: Vicky
- Children: 4
- Parent: Paul Yakabuski (father)
- Profession: Businessman

John A. Yakabuski ECO (born June 14, 1957) is a Canadian politician who served as Ontario Minister of Natural Resources and Forestry from 2018 to 2021 in the Doug Ford cabinet. He was a Progressive Conservative member of the Legislative Assembly of Ontario who was elected in the eastern Ontario riding of Renfrew—Nipissing—Pembroke in 2003. His father, Paul Yakabuski, was also a Tory Member of Provincial Parliament (MPP) for the area from 1963 to 1987.

== Background ==
Yakabuski is a former real estate sales representative, and was for twenty years the owner and operator of Yakabuski's Home Hardware in Barry's Bay, Ontario. At the time of his election, he was a member of the steering committee of St. Francis Memorial Hospital's Capital Equipment Campaign. He is also active in the local Lutheran church. His late brother, Kim Yakabuski, was the life partner of former Liberal Attorney-General Ian Scott. His brother, Konrad Yakabuski, is a columnist for The Globe and Mail. He and his wife Vicky have four children.

== Politics ==
Yakabuski was elected to the Barry's Bay municipal council in 1997, and was responsible for overseeing various issues concerning the region's amalgamation. He did not seek re-election in 2000.

Yakabuski was elected to the Ontario legislature in the 2003 provincial election, defeating Liberal Derek Nighbor by 595 votes. This result was regarded by some as an upset, as it was the only formerly Liberal seat to be won by the Tories in an election that saw the Liberals elected to a strong majority government. Moreover, the seat had been held for many years by Liberal Sean Conway (Yakabuski's second cousin). Yakabuski won the election despite publicizing of his earlier convictions by the opposition press.

In the 2007 provincial election, he was easily re-elected, defeating Liberal candidate Sean Kelly by over 15,000 votes. He was re-elected in both the 2011 provincial election and the 2014 provincial election.

Yakabuski was the Labour and Training Critic in the Official Opposition and the Whip of the Official Opposition. He ran for the position of interim leader of the party following the resignation of Tim Hudak but was passed over in favour of Jim Wilson.

Yakabuski was appointed the Minister of Natural Resources and Forestry in the Cabinet of Doug Ford. He was dropped from cabinet in the 2021 reshuffle by Premier Doug Ford, and was appointed the Parliamentary Assistant to the Premier of Ontario.

Yakabuski was re-elected in the 2022 Ontario general election. On June 29, 2022, Yakabuski was appointed the Parliamentary Assistant to the Minister of Environment, Parks and Conservation.

=== Electoral record ===
2022 Ontario general election: Renfrew—Nipissing—Pembroke
Party	Candidate	Votes	%	±%	Expenditures
Progressive Conservative	John Yakabuski	24,563	61.12	–8.07	$37,426
New Democratic	Kurt Stoll	6,872	17.10	+0.36	$29,868
Liberal	Oliver A. Jacob	3,928	9.77	+0.02	$1,685
New Blue	Thomas O'Connor	1,868	4.65	–	$8,416
Green	Anna Dolan	1,470	3.66	+0.68	$455
Ontario Party	Kade MacWilliams	1,162	2.89	–	$2,875
Confederation of Regions	Murray Reid	325	0.81	+0.03	$642
Total valid votes/expense limit		40,188	99.41	–	$122,280
Total rejected, unmarked and declined ballots		239	0.59	–0.47	
Turnout		40,427	46.29	–13.45	
Eligible voters		87,343			
Progressive Conservative hold		Swing		–4.22	
Source: Elections Ontario

2018 Ontario general election: Renfrew—Nipissing—Pembroke
Party	Candidate	Votes	%	±%
Progressive Conservative	John Yakabuski	33,350	69.19	+8.13
New Democratic	Ethel Lavalley	8,066	16.73	+2.27
Liberal	Jackie Agnew	4,701	9.75	–9.35
Green	Anna Dolan	1,436	2.98	–0.26
Confederation of Regions	Murray Reid	373	0.77	–0.41
Libertarian	Jesse Wood	273	0.57	–
Total valid votes		48,199	98.94	
Total rejected, unmarked and declined ballots		517	1.06	–0.06
Turnout		48,716	59.74	+5.42
Eligible voters		81,550		
Progressive Conservative hold		Swing		+2.93
Source: Elections Ontario

2014 Ontario general election: Renfrew—Nipissing—Pembroke
Party	Candidate	Votes	%	±%
Progressive Conservative	John Yakabuski	25,241	61.07	–9.72
Liberal	Rod Boileau	7,897	19.11	+3.12
New Democratic	Brian Dougherty	5,978	14.46	+3.49
Green	Benjamin Wright	1,337	3.23	+1.76
Confederation of Regions	Murray Reid	489	1.18	+0.39
Independent	Chad Beckwith-Smith	392	0.95	–
Total valid votes		41,334	98.88	
Total rejected, unmarked and declined ballots		470	1.12	+0.85
Turnout		41,804	54.32	+1.63
Eligible voters		76,956		
Progressive Conservative hold		Swing		–6.42
Source: Elections Ontario

2011 Ontario general election
Party	Candidate	Votes	%	±%
Progressive Conservative	John Yakabuski	27,594	70.78	+8.43
Liberal	John O'Leary	6,231	15.98	-8.73
New Democratic	Brian Dougherty	4,277	10.97	+3.38
Green	Kyle Jones	574	1.47	-2.96
Confederation of Regions	Murray Reid	309	0.79	+0.59
Total valid votes		38,985	100.0	
Total rejected, unmarked and declined ballots		107	0.27	
Turnout		39,092	52.69	
Eligible voters		74,191		
Progressive Conservative hold		Swing		+8.58
Source: Elections Ontario

2007 Ontario general election
Party	Candidate	Votes	%	±%
Progressive Conservative	John Yakabuski	24,981	62.35	+18.21
Liberal	Sean Kelly	9,902	24.71	-17.95
New Democratic	Felicite Stairs	3,039	7.59	-4.07
Green	Mark MacKenzie	1,773	4.43	+2.89
Family Coalition	Bruce Dean	290	0.72	
Confederation of Regions	Tilton Beaumont	80	0.20	
Total valid votes		40,065	100.0	

2003 Ontario general election
Party	Candidate	Votes	%	±%
Progressive Conservative	John Yakabuski	19,274	44.14	+3.76
Liberal	Derek Nighbor	18,629	42.66	-10.69
New Democratic	Felicite Stairs	5,092	11.66	+6.44
Green	Chris Walker	671	1.54	+0.89
Total valid votes		43,666	100.0	

=== Cabinet positions ===
Ford ministry, Province of Ontario (2018–present)
Cabinet posts (2)
Predecessor	Office	Successor
Jeff Yurek	Minister of Natural Resources and Forestry; November 5, 2018 – June 18, 2021	Greg Rickford
Kathryn McGarry	Minister of Transportation; June 29, 2018 – November 5, 2018	Jeff Yurek
