= Source Lake (Nipissing District) =

Lake in Ontario, Canada

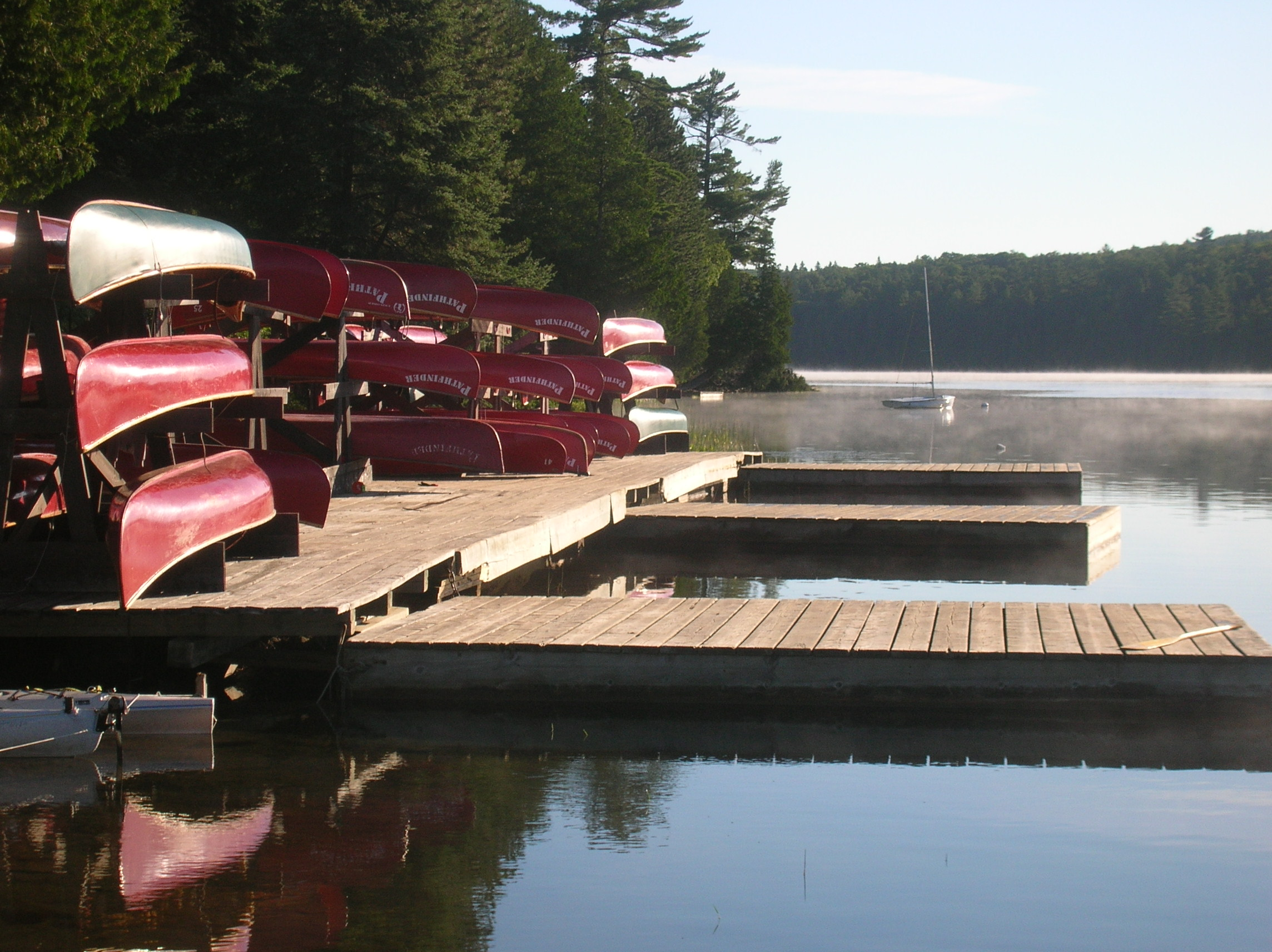
- Camp Pathfinder on Source Lake

- Location of Source Lake in Ontario
- Location: Nipissing District, Ontario, Canada
- Coordinates: 45°33′39″N 78°39′01″W
- Type: Lake
- Part of: Saint Lawrence River drainage basin
- Primary outflows: Madawaska River
- Max. length: 3.7 km (2.3 mi)
- Max. width: 1.2 km (0.75 mi)
- Surface elevation: 448 m (1,470 ft)

Source Lake is a small lake in geographic Canisbay and Peck townships in the Unorganized South part of Nipissing District in Northeastern Ontario, Canada. It lies in southern Algonquin Provincial Park and is part of the Saint Lawrence River drainage basin. The river is the source of the Madawaska River, which flows via the Ottawa River to the Saint Lawrence River.

Camp Pathfinder, a boys' summer camp, is located on Source Lake.

== See also ==
- List of lakes in Ontario
