= Kamaniskeg Lake =

Lake in Ontario, Canada

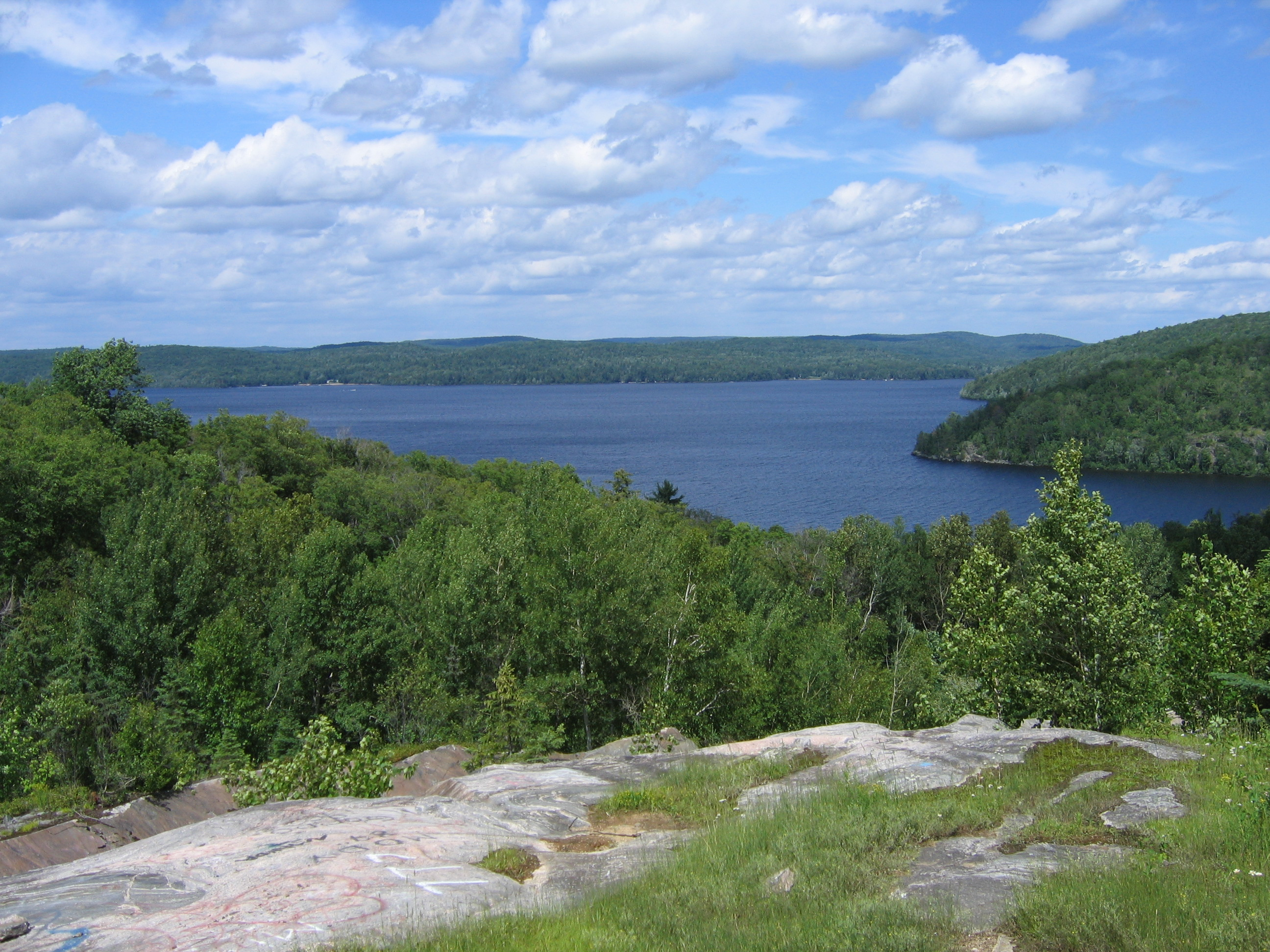

- Location of the lake in Southern Ontario
- Location: Hastings County and Renfrew County, Ontario
- Coordinates: 45°25′03″N 77°41′23″W
- Part of: Ottawa River drainage basin
- Primary inflows: Madawaska River
- Primary outflows: Madawaska River
- Basin countries: Canada
- Max. length: 13 km (8.1 mi)
- Max. width: 6 km (3.7 mi)
- Max. depth: 40 metres (131 ft)
- Surface elevation: 283 m (928 ft)
- Settlements: Barry's Bay, Combermere

Kamaniskeg Lake is a lake in the municipalities of Hastings Highlands, Hastings County, and Madawaska Valley, Renfrew County, in Southern Ontario, Canada. It is part of the Ottawa River drainage basin and is located in the Madawaska River Valley, with nearby communities of Barry's Bay and Combermere. The lake is known for its simple beauty, with a mixture of forest, and rock and sand beaches.

== Geography ==
Kamaniskeg Lake is part of the Ottawa River drainage basin with the communities of Barry's Bay at its northern end, and Combermere near the southeast. The Dispersed Rural Community of Barrymere is on the lake at the southeast end. The southern two thirds of the lake is in geographic Bangor Township in Hastings Highlands, Hastings County; the northern one third is in geographic Sherwood Township, and the southeastern tip in geographic Radcliffe Township, both townships in Madawaska Valley, Renfrew County.

The Madawaska River, known for its rapids, is the primary inflow, at the west, and outflow, from the southeast. There are also three other named creek inflows: Biernacki Creek, Carson Creek and Purdy Creek.

=== Tributaries ===
Clockwise from the Madawaska River outflow:

- Purdy Creek
- Madawaska River
- Carson Creek
- Biernacki Creek

=== Islands ===
From north to south, the islands in the lake are:

- Mask Island (45.474°N 77.685°W) - located at the northern end of Kamaniskeg Lake near the community of Barry's Bay, to which it is connected by a causeway. Formerly called Welshman’s Island on patent plans of 1861, the island was named for Pawel Bronas Mask (1865–1964), a Pole who settled on it in 1918.
- Mayflower Island
- Parcher Island

== History ==
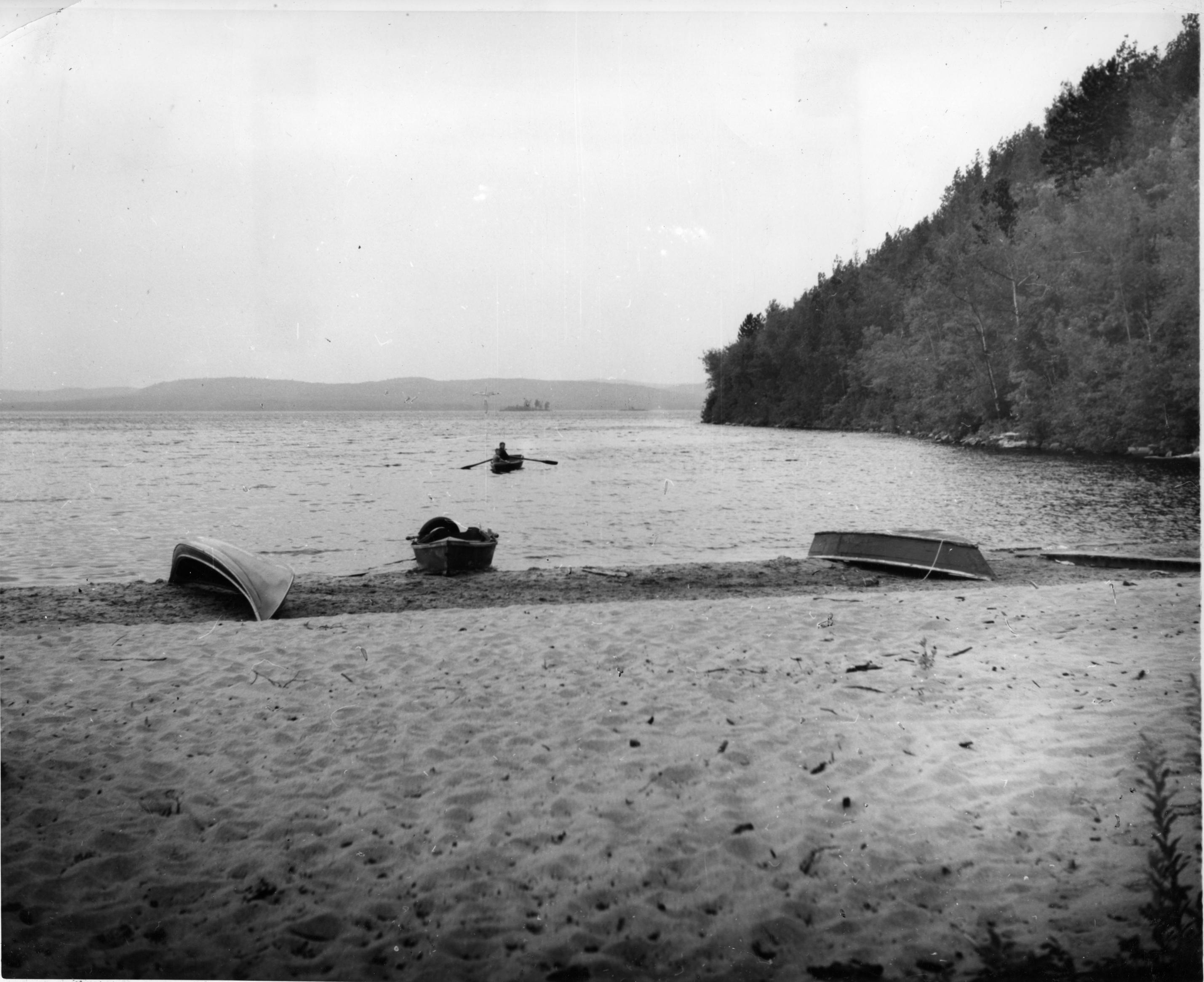
Sand Bay, Kaminiskeg Lake, circa 1965

The lake's name is derived from the Ojibwe Gaa-miniskeg zaaga'igan meaning "lake of many islands".

The lake holds the wreck of the Mayflower, a paddle steamer which sank in 1912. The wreck site is on the north side of the two islands, about 500 yards (460 m) from the large island heading towards the section of the lake heading to Barry's Bay. It is usually marked by a white floating jug, and at a depth of about 25 feet (7.6 m) to the bottom.

== Transportation ==
Renfrew County Road 62 runs to the east of the lake between Barry's Bay and Combermere, and connects to Ontario Highway 60 at the north end at Barry's Bay.

The Kamaniskeg Lake Water Aerodrome, a seaplane base, is on the southeast of lake.

== See also ==
- List of lakes of Ontario
