= Lake Madawaska =

Lake in Ontario, Canada

- Location within Ontario
- Location: Ontario
- Coordinates: 45°24′20″N 76°20′30″W
- Type: reservoir
- Primary inflows: Madawaska River
- Primary outflows: Madawaska River
- Basin countries: Canada
- Settlements: Arnprior, Ontario

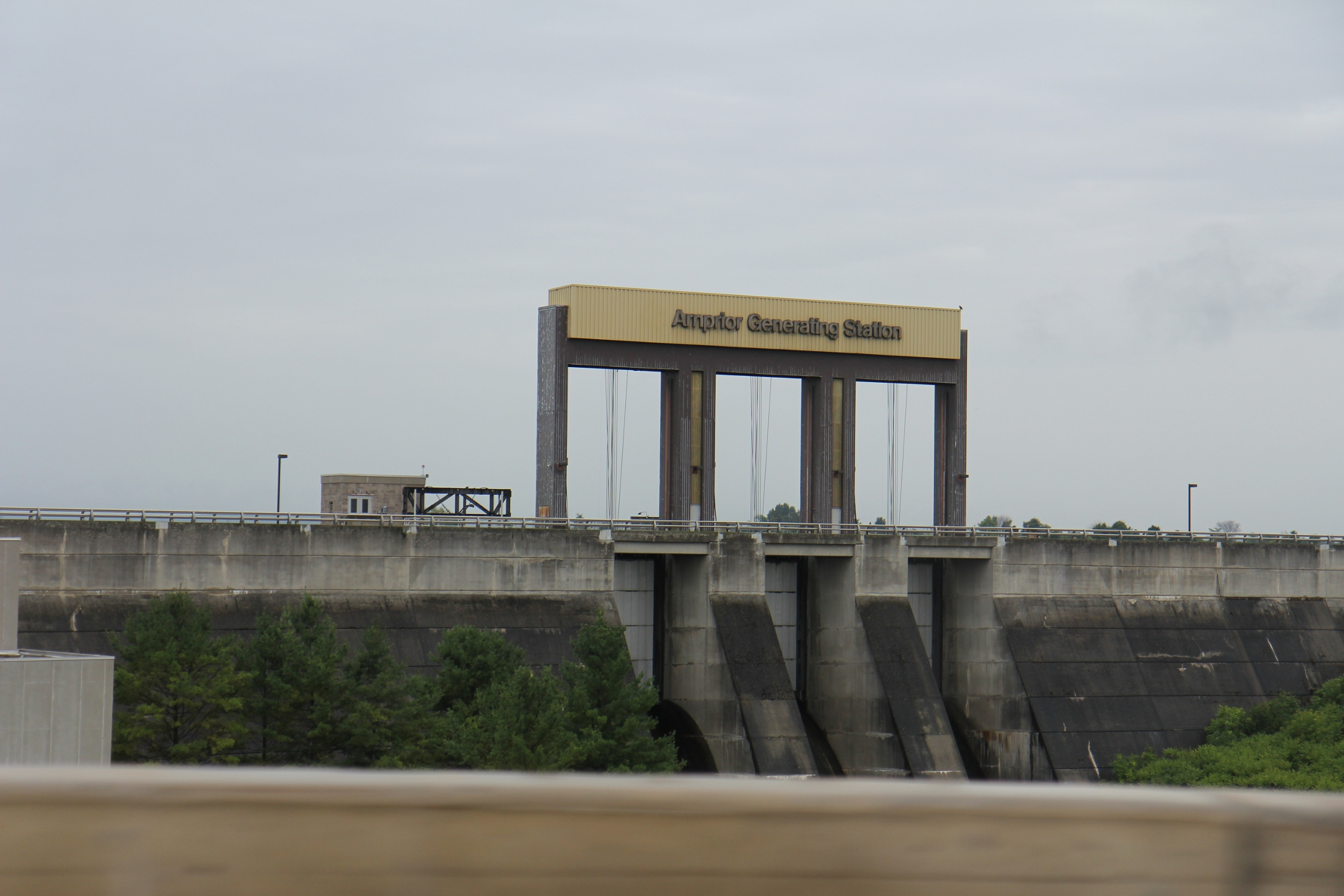
The Arnprior Generating Station

Lake Madawaska is the headpond of the Arnprior Generating Station (operated by Ontario Power Generation) near the town of Arnprior, Ontario. The lake was created in 1976 by a hydroelectric dam on the Madawaska River just before it joins the Ottawa River.
