= Arnprior =

- Town (lower-tier)
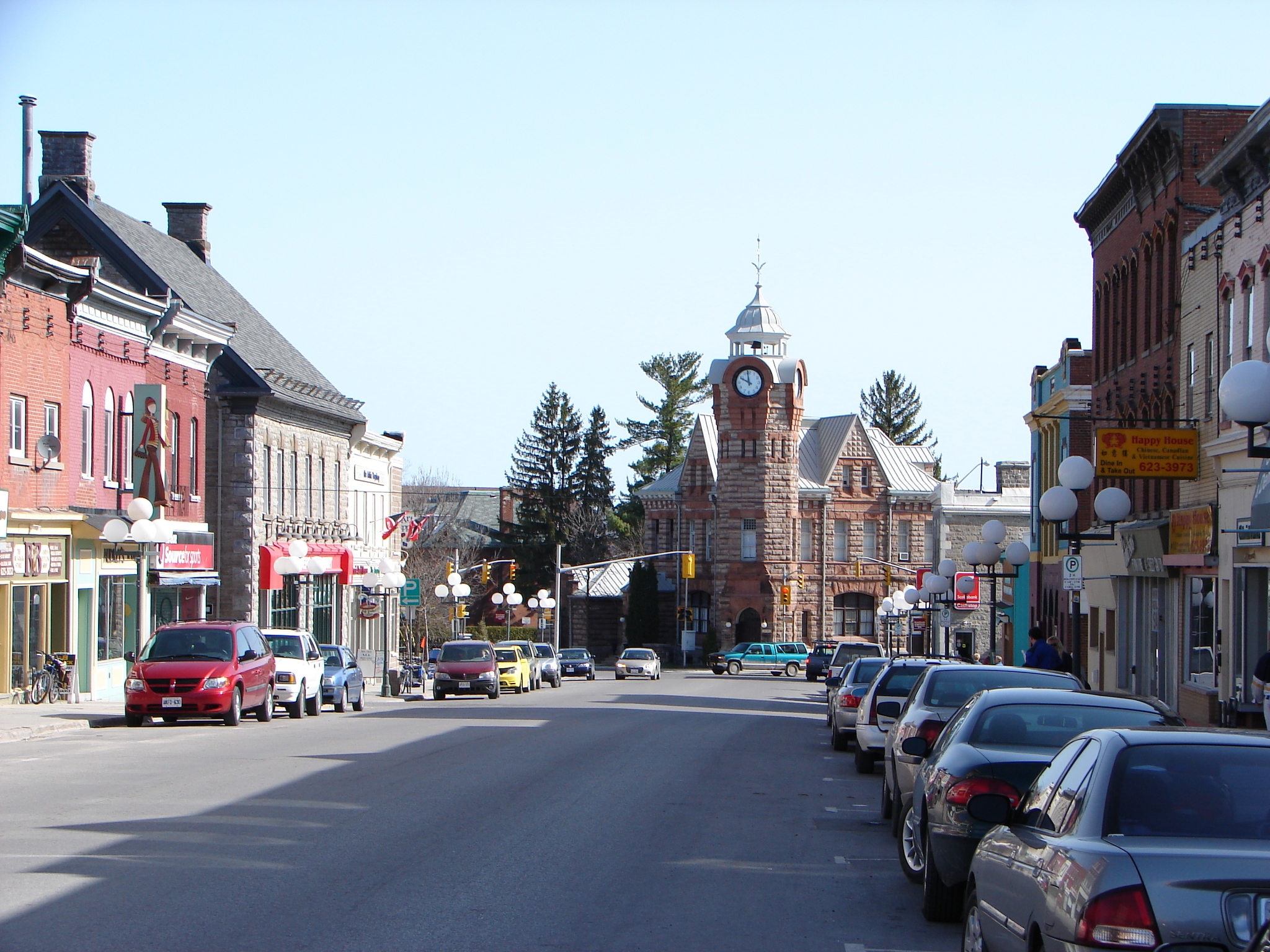
- Centre of Arnprior
- Nickname: "The 'Prior'"
- Motto: Where the Rivers Meet
- Location within Renfrew County Location within Southern Ontario Location within Ontario Location within Canada Location within North America
- Coordinates: 45°26′N 76°21′W
- Country: Canada
- Province: Ontario
- County: Renfrew
- Established (timber industry): 1851
- Incorporated (Village): 1862
- Incorporated (Town): 1892

Government
  - Type: Town
  - Mayor: Lisa McGee

Area
  - Land: 13.04 km^{2} (5.03 sq mi)
  - Urban: 12.09 km^{2} (4.67 sq mi)
- Elevation: 74.2 m (243 ft)

Population (2021)
  - Total: 9,629
  - Density: 738.5/km^{2} (1,913/sq mi)
  - Urban: 11,305
  - Urban density: 935.1/km^{2} (2,422/sq mi)
- Time zone: UTC−05:00 (EST)
  - Summer (DST): UTC−04:00 (EDT)
- Postal Code FSA: K7S
- Area codes: 613, 343, 753
- Website: www.arnprior.ca

Arnprior is a town in Renfrew County, Ontario, Canada.

Arnprior has experienced significant growth in populations with the widening of the Ontario Highway 417 to four lanes. The town experienced an increase in population by 8.4% from 2011 to 2016, at which time its population was 8,795. It was also during these critical 5 years that the Town of Arnprior surpassed the neighboring Town of Renfrew, Ontario, to become the county's third-largest town or city by population, behind Petawawa and Pembroke. The town is a namesake of Arnprior, Scotland, and is known for its lumber, hydro power generation, aerospace, farming, and proximity to the National Capital Region.

== History ==
The land occupied by what is now called Arnprior is part of the traditional territory of the Algonquin nation of indigenous North Americans. The first European explorers, led by Samuel de Champlain, first visited the area in May 1613.

In 1823, a 1,200-acre (490 ha) surveyed block was ceded to Archibald McNab and named McNab Township. McNab had approval from the Family Compact to treat the settlers on his land in the feudal manner practised in Scotland. In 1831 the town was named by the Buchanan Brothers after McNab's ancestral home of Arnprior, Scotland.

Tired of the harsh treatment, the settlers revolted and, after a government investigation, McNab was forced to vacate the area in 1841. Arnprior and Braeside and McNab township grew as separate communities and boomed when they became integrated into eastern Ontario's massive timber industry.

One of the most successful businessmen of the upper Ottawa was Daniel McLachlin, who built a massive sawmill at the confluence of the Madawaska and Ottawa rivers, and expanded the community of Arnprior. The lumber industry maintained a significant position until the closing of the Gillies Mill. One of the most enduring structures of the day was a grist mill built by the Buchanans on the west bank of the Madawaska River.

By 1869, Arnprior was an incorporated village with a population of 2,000 in the Township of McNab. It was on the Brockville and Ottawa Railway at the junction of the Madawaska and Ottawa rivers. The average price of land was $20 to $40.

The grey stone building served many purposes after it stopped being used as a grist mill, finally being operated as a restaurant and a gas station, first by the Beattie and then the Baird families, ending in 1974. The facility was bought by Ontario Hydro prior to the restructuring on the bridge and the creation of a new weir to control the river. The building was consumed by fire in 1976. The forests of the period are represented in the Grove which is an example of indigenous forest, grown after a fire in the 18th century. With individual specimens reaching 175 ft (53 m), these are the tallest white pines in Ontario.

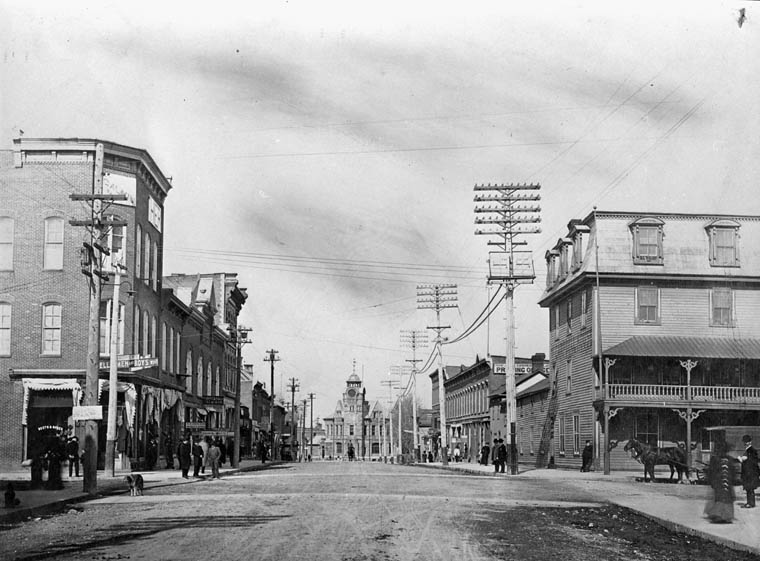
John Street, 1906

Arnprior was incorporated as a village in 1862. Thirty years later (in 1892), it was incorporated as a town.

On June 8, 1944, a Castle-class corvette, HMS Rising Castle, was recommissioned as HMCS Arnprior until 1946.

Arnprior became a recognized name in the numismatic trade. This has a special link to a local employer. In 1955 Playtex ordered some silver dollars for their employees. These coins were later found to show only two and one-half water lines instead of four to the right of the canoe. This variety becomes known as the Arnprior dollar.

The history of Arnprior is preserved and documented at the Arnprior and District Museum (located in the former post office building and library) and the Arnprior and McNab/Braeside Archives, located next door in the basement of the public library. The sandstone building is the defining element in local architecture.

== Geography ==
It is located 65 km (40 mi) west of Downtown Ottawa, at the confluence of the Madawaska River and the Ottawa River in the Ottawa Valley.

=== Climate ===
Climate data for Arnprior (1981−2010)
Month	Jan	Feb	Mar	Apr	May	Jun	Jul	Aug	Sep	Oct	Nov	Dec	Year
Record high °C (°F)	12.0 (53.6)	11.0 (51.8)	22.8 (73.0)	30.6 (87.1)	33.0 (91.4)	35.0 (95.0)	37.2 (99.0)	38.0 (100.4)	33.0 (91.4)	27.0 (80.6)	21.1 (70.0)	15.0 (59.0)	38.0 (100.4)
Mean daily maximum °C (°F)	−6.9 (19.6)	−4.6 (23.7)	1.6 (34.9)	10.8 (51.4)	18.8 (65.8)	23.9 (75.0)	26.6 (79.9)	25.2 (77.4)	19.8 (67.6)	12.3 (54.1)	4.2 (39.6)	−3.2 (26.2)	10.7 (51.3)
Daily mean °C (°F)	−11.5 (11.3)	−9.5 (14.9)	−3.3 (26.1)	5.6 (42.1)	12.9 (55.2)	18.1 (64.6)	20.7 (69.3)	19.4 (66.9)	14.5 (58.1)	7.8 (46.0)	0.8 (33.4)	−6.8 (19.8)	5.7 (42.3)
Mean daily minimum °C (°F)	−16.0 (3.2)	−14.3 (6.3)	−8.1 (17.4)	0.4 (32.7)	7.0 (44.6)	12.2 (54.0)	14.8 (58.6)	13.7 (56.7)	9.3 (48.7)	3.2 (37.8)	−2.7 (27.1)	−10.4 (13.3)	0.8 (33.4)
Record low °C (°F)	−38.0 (−36.4)	−37.2 (−35.0)	−31.0 (−23.8)	−17.8 (0.0)	−9.0 (15.8)	−1.1 (30.0)	4.0 (39.2)	2.0 (35.6)	−4.0 (24.8)	−8.3 (17.1)	−23.0 (−9.4)	−35.0 (−31.0)	−38.0 (−36.4)
Average precipitation mm (inches)	56.7 (2.23)	43.8 (1.72)	55.2 (2.17)	62.8 (2.47)	74.8 (2.94)	73.5 (2.89)	90.5 (3.56)	82.1 (3.23)	78.1 (3.07)	73.9 (2.91)	68.5 (2.70)	45.8 (1.80)	805.6 (31.72)
Average rainfall mm (inches)	19.2 (0.76)	15.9 (0.63)	29.6 (1.17)	57.7 (2.27)	74.8 (2.94)	73.5 (2.89)	90.5 (3.56)	82.1 (3.23)	78.1 (3.07)	70.4 (2.77)	54.4 (2.14)	15.9 (0.63)	662.0 (26.06)
Average snowfall cm (inches)	37.5 (14.8)	27.9 (11.0)	25.6 (10.1)	5.0 (2.0)	0.0 (0.0)	0.0 (0.0)	0.0 (0.0)	0.0 (0.0)	0.0 (0.0)	3.5 (1.4)	14.1 (5.6)	29.9 (11.8)	143.6 (56.5)
Average precipitation days (≥ 0.2 mm)	9.2	6.8	7.7	8.3	9.7	9.3	9.3	7.9	9.7	9.9	9.0	8.7	105.5
Average rainy days (≥ 0.2 mm)	2.2	1.8	3.5	7.4	9.7	9.3	9.3	7.9	9.7	9.5	7.4	2.6	80.2
Average snowy days (≥ 0.2 cm)	7.5	5.2	4.4	1.3	0.0	0.0	0.0	0.0	0.0	0.5	2.1	6.3	27.3
Source: Environment Canada

== Demographics ==
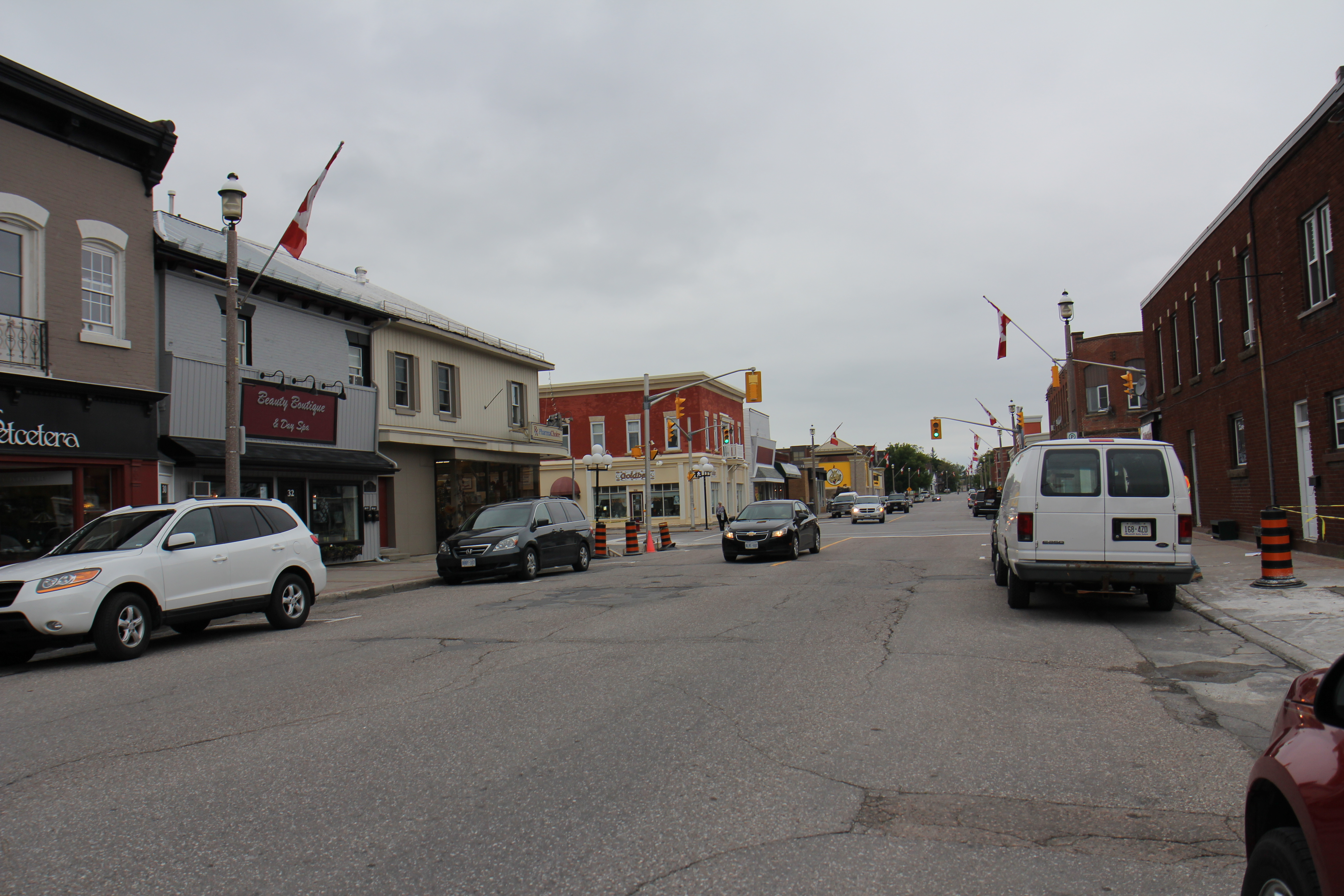
Elgin Street in Arnprior

In the 2021 Census of Population conducted by Statistics Canada, Arnprior had a population of 9,629 living in 4,308 of its 4,458 total private dwellings, a change of 9.5% from its 2016 population of 8,795. With a land area of 13.04 km^{2} (5.03 sq mi), it had a population density of 738.4/km^{2} (1,912.5/sq mi) in 2021.

Canada census – Arnprior community profile

	2021	2016
Population	9,629 (+9.5% from 2016)	8,795 (+8.4% from 2011)
Land area	13.04 km^{2} (5.03 sq mi)	13.07 km^{2} (5.05 sq mi)
Population density	738.5/km^{2} (1,913/sq mi)	672.7/km^{2} (1,742/sq mi)
Median age	48.0 (M: 45.6, F: 50.0)	48.0 (M: 45.5, F: 50.5)
Private dwellings	4,458 (total) 4,308 (occupied)	4,124 (total) 3,912 (occupied)
Median household income	$75,500	$61,810

References: 2021 2016

Historical census populations – Arnprior

Year	Pop.	±%
1921	4,077	—
1931	4,023	−1.3%
1941	3,895	−3.2%
1951	4,381	+12.5%
1956	5,137	+17.3%
1961	5,474	+6.6%

Year	Pop.	±%
1966	5,693	+4.0%
1971	6,016	+5.7%
1976	6,111	+1.6%
1981	5,828	−4.6%
1986	6,040	+3.6%
1991	6,679	+10.6%

Year	Pop.	±%
1996	7,113	+6.5%
2001	7,192	+1.1%
2006	7,158	−0.5%
2011	8,114	+13.4%
2016	8,795	+8.4%
2021	9,629	+9.5%

Population counts are not adjusted for boundary changes.
Source: Statistics Canada

Mother tongue (2021):

- English as first language: 90.0 %
- French as first language: 4.0 %
- English and French as first languages: 1.0 %
- Other as first language: 4.2 %

== Economy ==
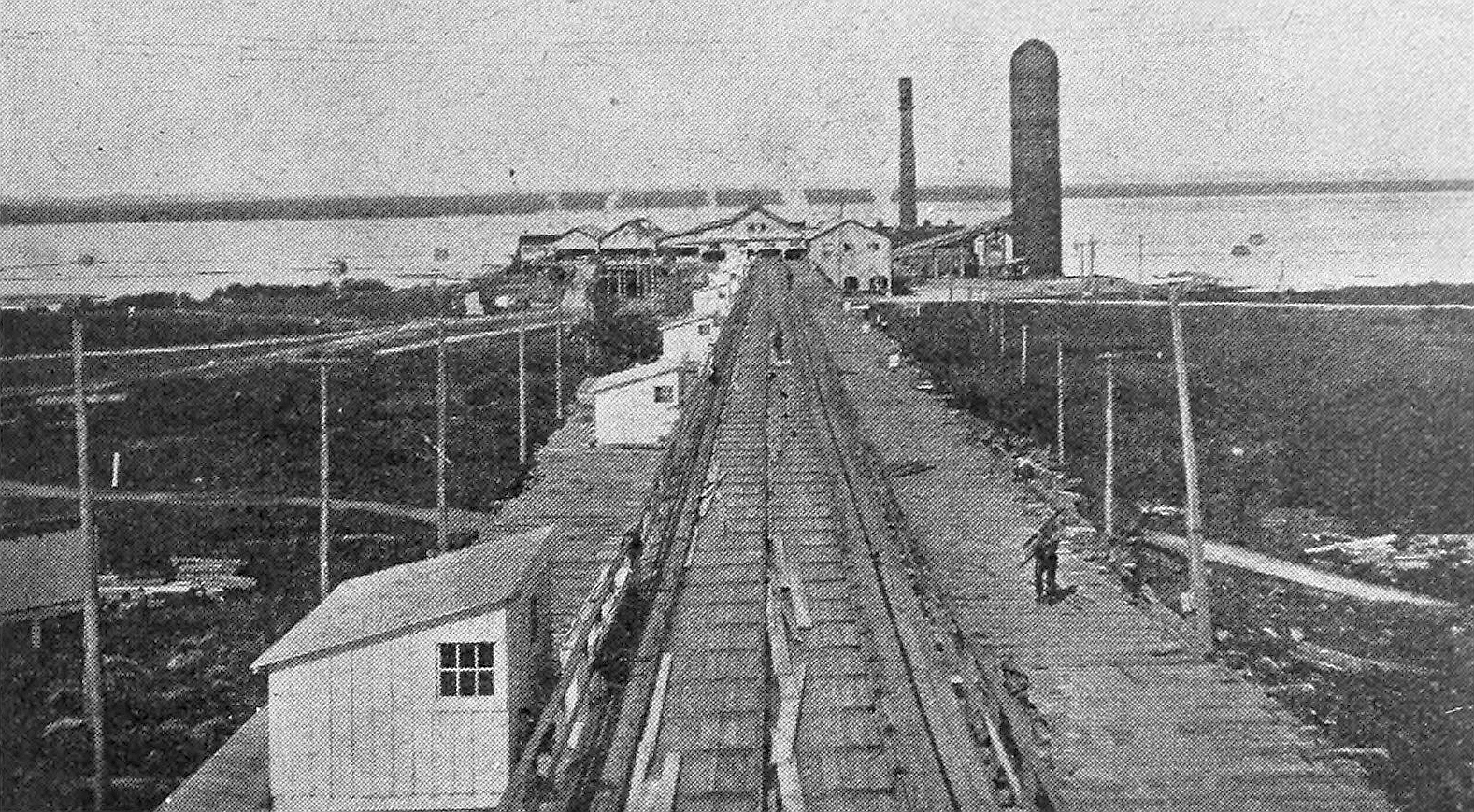
Lumber conveyor in Arnprior, 1921

Arnprior has drawn new business to Eastern Ontario. Proximity to the city of Ottawa, easy access to highway 417, access to a local airport, full services and infrastructure have contributed to making Arnprior the location for multinational corporations including Arnprior Aerospace Inc (permanently closed March 6, 2024), GE Vernova Hitachi Nuclear Energy Canada Inc, Nylene Canada Inc, Pacific Safety Products, Pillar 5 Pharma, Sandvik Materials Technology Canada, and other businesses.

The Arnprior and Area Chamber of Commerce has over 100 members and is a support and advocate for many of the corporations and small to medium-sized businesses within the Arnprior area.

Some of the major corporations and top employers:

- Plaintree Systems Inc.
- Nu-tech Precision Metals
- Pillar 5
- BWX Technologies, Inc.
- M. Sullivan & Son Limited
- Nylene Canada
- Pacific Safety Products
- Arnprior & District Memorial Hospital

The lumber trade continued in the form of the Gillies sawmill in nearby McNab Township until its closing in 1993. Pictures of the early days of the lumbering industry are seen at the online Charles Macnamara Retrospective.

Kenwood Mills, initially a blanket manufacturer which developed woven fabrics for the pulp and paper industry, was a significant employer in Arnprior and was bought in 1918 by Huyck Corporation. It was a strong contributor to Arnprior remaining viable during the Depression. The building has now been renovated into the Kenwood Corporate Centre which houses a number of offices, warehouse spaces, conference rooms, a café and a gym.

Sullivan and Sons and Smith Construction companies were significant economic drivers and employers based in Arnprior. In 2014 they celebrated their 100th year in business and continue to be a major employer in the town and a large community supporter.

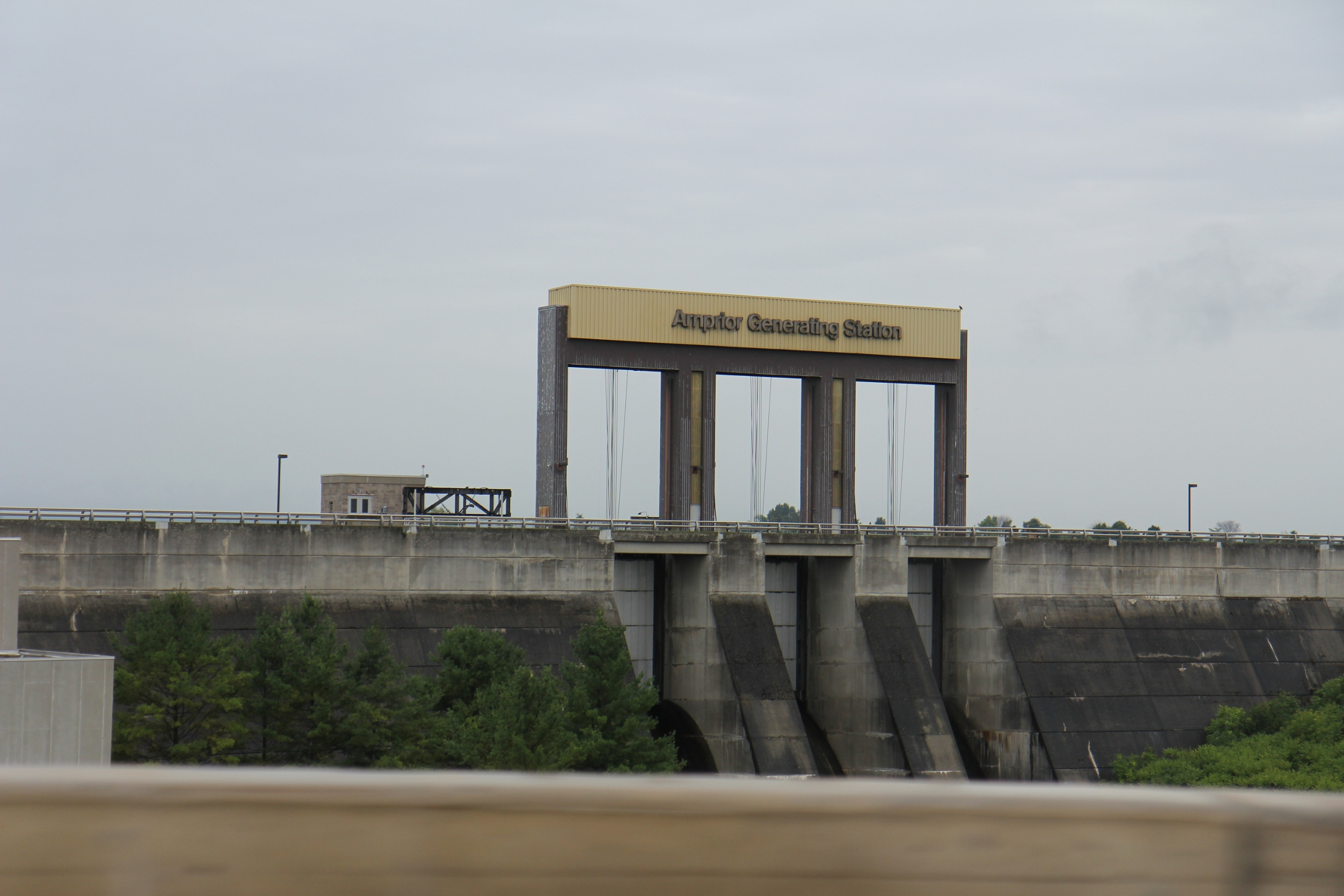
The Arnprior Generating Station

After the Second World War, companies such as Playtex, Pfizer and Boeing came to Arnprior. Boeing Aircraft Company began manufacturing in 1955 and maintained an operation until selling to Arnprior Aerospace in October 2005.

The Madawaska River at McEwen's Creek was dammed to create a hydro generating station with approval given in 1972. The dam, which became operational in 1976, has created a new body of water known as Lake Madawaska. This was the fifth and last dam to be built on the Madawaska River, and they have a total generating capacity of 614 MW.

=== Agriculture ===
Agriculture has been a fixture surrounding Arnprior since the arrival of McNab's Scottish immigrants. The farming tradition has been celebrated by the Arnprior Fair since 1854.

== Government ==
Arnprior council consists of the mayor, Lisa McGee, county councillor, and five councillors.

Arnprior is within the Federal riding of Algonquin—Renfrew—Pembroke (previously Renfrew—Nipissing—Pembroke), represented by Cheryl Gallant of the Conservative Party of Canada since the year 2000.

Provincially, it is in the electoral district of Renfrew—Nipissing—Pembroke, represented by Billy Denault of the Progressive Conservative Party of Ontario, who was first elected in 2025.

== Attractions ==
With Arnprior's central location between the National Capital Region and the Ottawa Valley it offers visitors and residents alike access to the entertainment and events of the city as well as access to nationally recognized outdoor activities all within a short travel time.

Arnprior has several historical landmarks together with the many required modern conveniences, including shopping, hospital, recreation, restaurants, water sport facilities, and beaches. Arnprior has been recognized by the Communities in Bloom organization as the top community in its class for its heritage conservation, landscaping, beautification, tidiness, environmental efforts and community involvement.

Arnprior's recreation facilities include four walking trails, a marina, three ball diamonds, civic centre with two year-round ice surfaces and indoor pool, a curling rink, two municipal beaches, 14 parks covering 126.6 acres (512,000 m^{2}), and an airport that offers charter tours, skydiving and flying lessons.

Arnprior also has a large number of cultural groups, including historical organizations, live theatre, chamber music, dance and choir, service clubs and an active artistic community with numerous studio tours and exhibits.

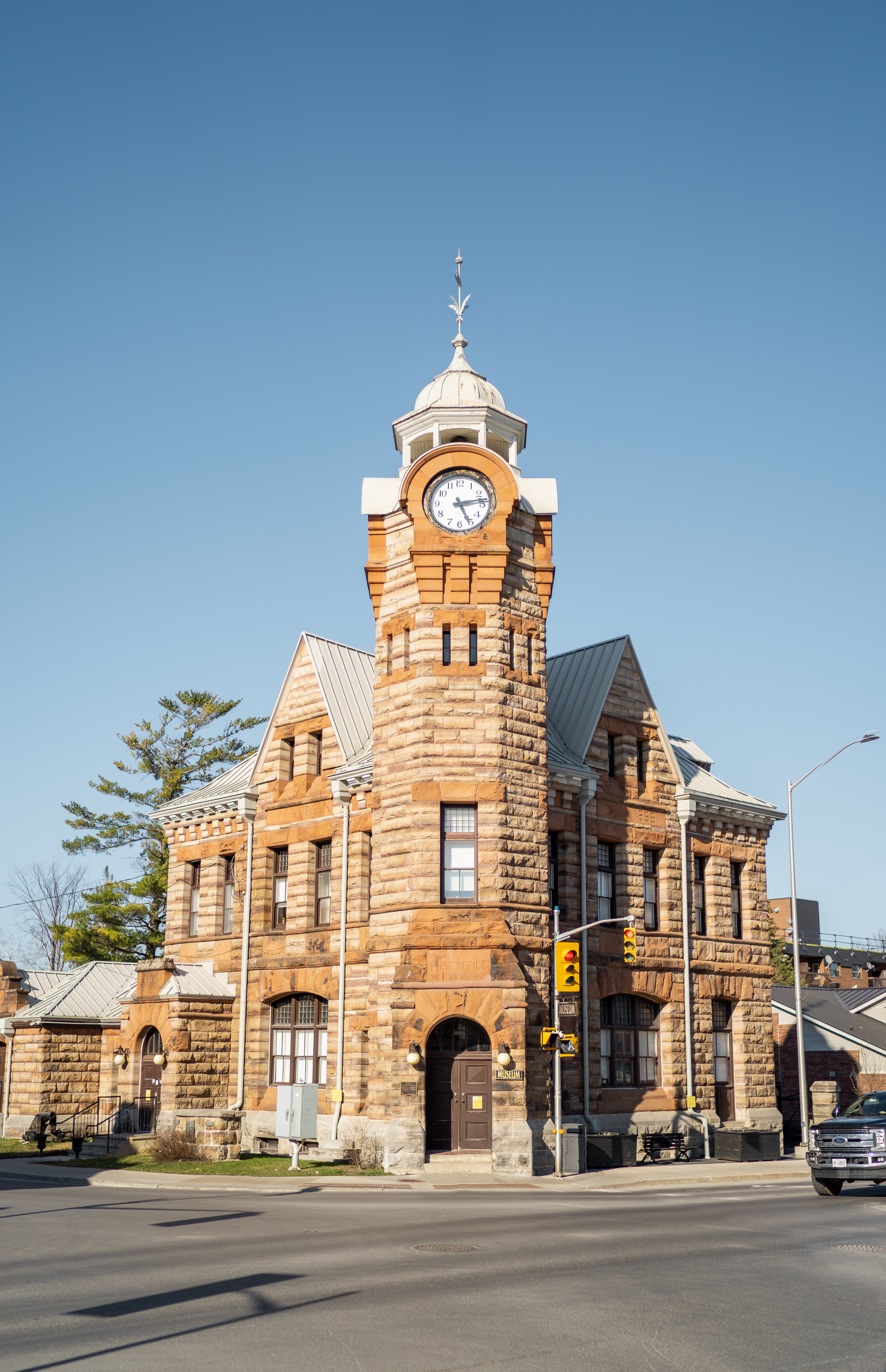
Arnprior and District Museum

Some main attractions for the town are:

- Arnprior Market: This annual event is held on Sundays along John Street in Downtown Arnprior. From the May long weekend until the last Sunday in September John Street is closed to traffic and over 30 vendors lines the street selling everything from fresh produce and preservatives to unique crafts and giftware. The Market runs from 9 am – 2 pm.
- Robert Simpson Park. The park houses a guarded beach, a splash pad, a canteen and a band stand where free live music can be found throughout the summer on Sundays from 2 – 4 pm. Robert Simpson Park features views of the Ottawa River and many activities take place at the park such as the annual Priorpalooza Music Festival, beach volleyball, and yoga on the beach.
- There are many walking trails in Arnprior including the Millennium trails and Macnamara Trail which provides scenic views of the waterfront, downtown heritage homes, and two nature trails including a walk-through of the Gillies Grove, a 45-acre (180,000 m^{2}) tract of old-growth forest, preserving the white pine which was the foundation of the local lumber industry. Gillies Grove is also home to the tallest tree (45 m [148 ft]) in Ontario. Additionally the rivers and local lakes encourage boating, fishing and canoeing.
- Arnprior & District Museum, housed in the former Arnprior Post Office Customs House and built in 1896, offers a unique glimpse into the town's early days. It has undergone many renovations including a completely renovated 2nd floor which is home to a new modern exhibited. The museum also features travelling exhibits from the Royal Ontario Museum often and hosts the Annual Quilt Exhibit every November.
- Priorpalooza, 12 hours of music celebrating local artists, this is a free event hosted at the beachfront on the first Saturday in June every year.
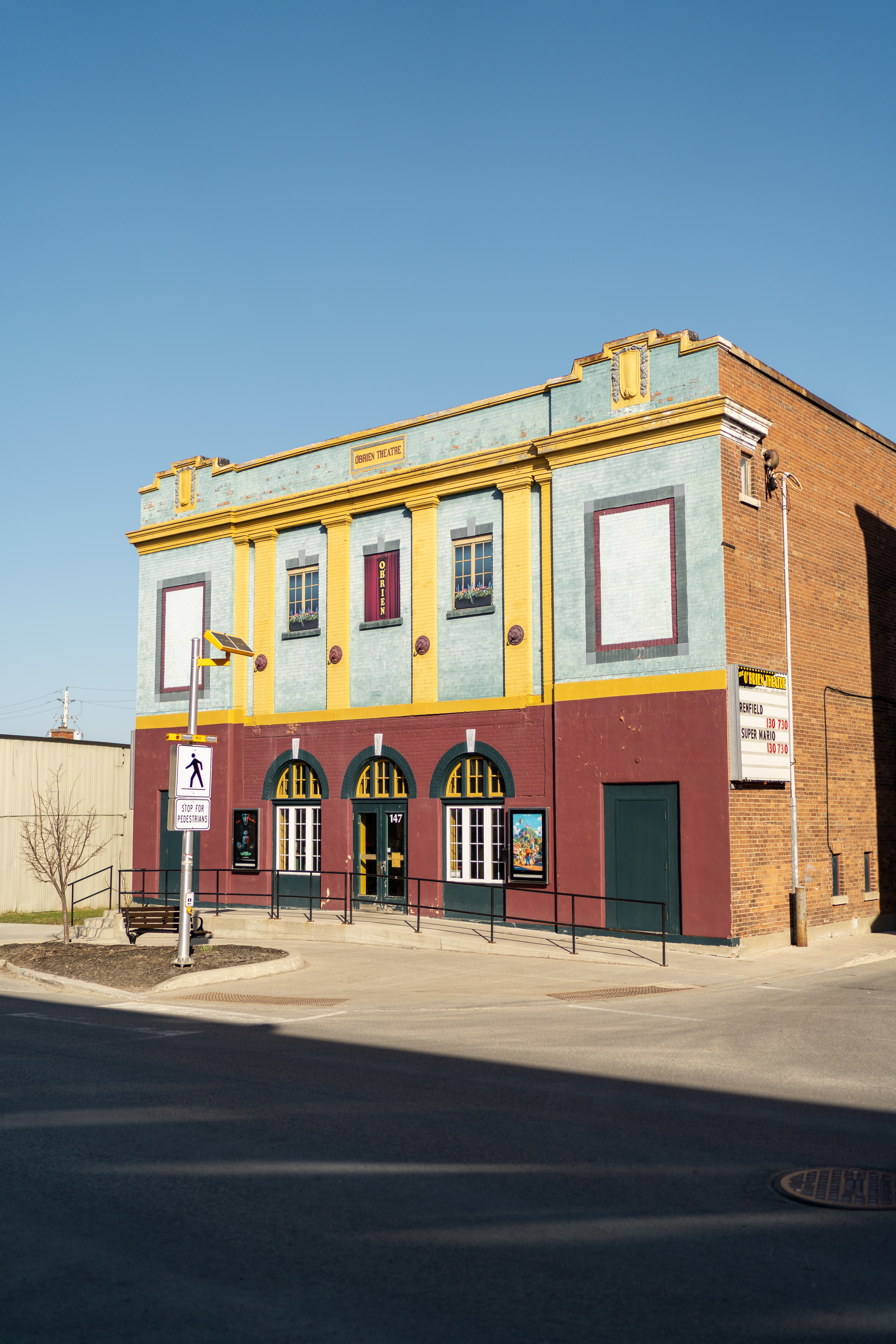
  The O'Brien Theatre
- The O'Brien Theatre is a historic cinema in the town of Arnprior. Arnprior's first cinema opened on the site in 1906, and the current building dates from 1919. It was originally both a cinema and venue for vaudeville performances.
- White Pine Festival, a three-day event held all around town that includes vendors, music, food, a highland dance competition and a movie in the park.
- The Arnprior Fair, a mix of musical entertainment, livestock showing, educational displays and rides.

Galilee Centre, which is the former McLachlin Estate along the Ottawa River, is a holistic spiritual life centre that hosts programs, groups and individuals. On site is a Royal Oak planted in 1860 by His Royal Highness, Edward Prince of Wales.

== Sport ==
Arnprior has a reputation for hosting large-scale regional and national events including the 2008 Telus Cup – National Midget 'AAA' Hockey Championship, the 2010 Canadian Broomball Championship, the 2012 World Broomball Championships and the 2013 IIHF Women's World Championship.

In 2014, Arnprior hosted the Association of Ontario Road Supervisors Annual Trade Show, and furthermore, Arnprior was the second last stop on Clara's Big Ride which featured six time Olympic Medalist Clara Hughes on her 12,000 km (7,500 mi) cross country bike journey to raise awareness and end the stigma of mental health. Arnprior also hosted the North American Orienteering Championships in fall 2014.

Ice hockey is the only municipally sponsored sport in Arnprior. The Arnprior Packers represent the town in the Central Canada Hockey League Tier 2, which is the town's highest level of competition in this sport. The games are played at the Nick Smith Centre which features two year round ice rinks, a 25-metre indoor swimming pool, a fitness centre and a community hall with kitchen. The two ice rinks each have ice surface measuring 200 ft × 85 ft (61 m × 26 m). Arena 'A' seating capacity of over 2,000; standing and seated 4,000 capacity.

Curling was established as an open-air sport in the Arnprior area, around 1865. The Arnprior Curling Club now occupies a 4-sheet building on Galvin Street (est. 1970). The highest level of competition hosted by the club are the Valley League and the Low Cup.

== Transportation ==
Arnprior is located on the Trans-Canada Highway system, where Highway 417 to the east becomes the two-lane Highway 17 to the west.

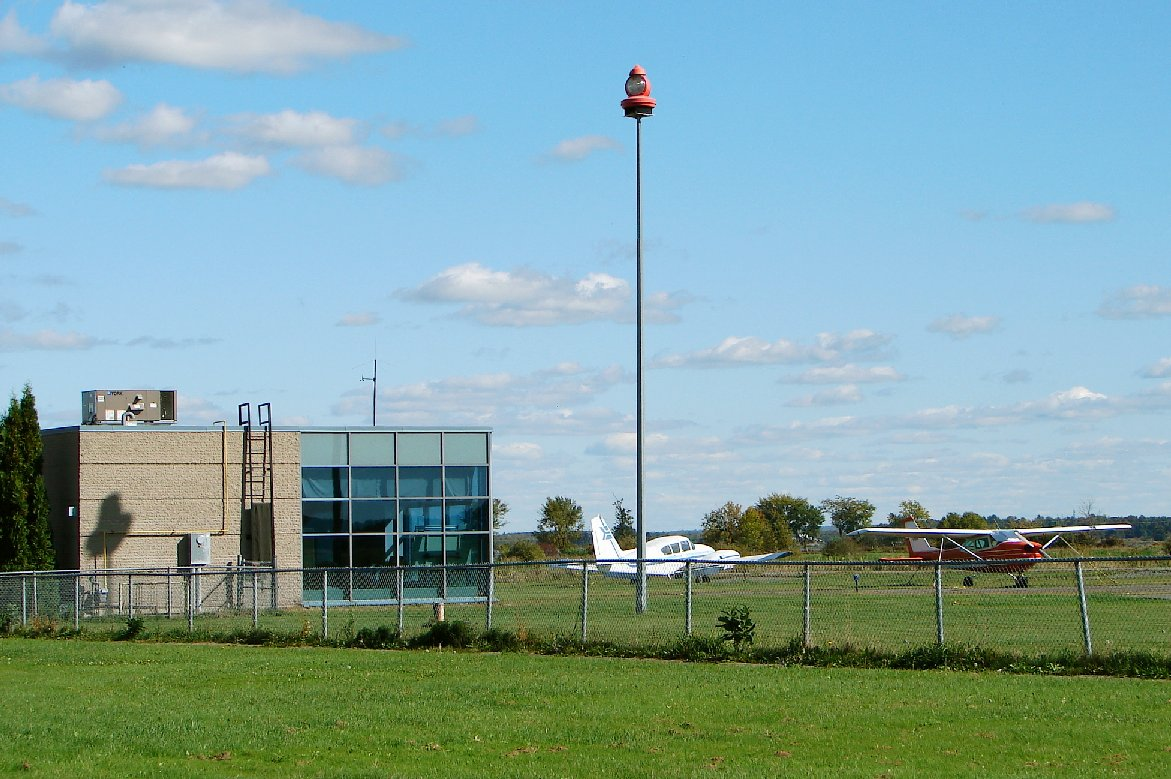
Arnprior Airport

The town is served by the Arnprior Airport, elevation 108 m (355 ft), and the nearby Arnprior Water Aerodrome, elevation 100 m (330 ft), for general aviation; although there is no longer commercial aviation at the airport. It was built for the British Commonwealth Air Training Plan and hosted No. 3 Training Command RCAF Flying Instructor School (FIS) with the Relief Landing Field located in Pontiac, Quebec, near Quyon, Quebec. Post war, the facility was used by the Canadian military and a training base known as the Civil Defence College, later known as the Emergency Measures Training Centre. The airport, operated by Arnprior Airport Commission, still operates with two runways for land-based aircraft and Arnprior Water Aerodrome with a dock and fuelling station for floatplanes. The airport property also houses many private hangars and a skydiving company.

Arnprior has a long history with railways. The Canada Central Railway reached Arnprior on December 6, 1864. On Easter Sunday, March 23, 1880, a change to standard gauge brought the Canadian Pacific Railway (CPR) main line. Later the Canadian National Railway (CNR) came and, through the majority of the 20th century, Arnprior was served by both major Canadian railways. The CNR tracks were pulled up and the right-of-way is used as a walking trail. In June 2012, CPR removed its tracks throughout the county.

The town is located at the confluence of the Ottawa and Madawaska rivers. It is cut off from the lower Ottawa River and the Saint Lawrence Seaway by the Chats rapids, and now the Chats Falls Generating Station. Following exploration, travel and transportation was by canoe: the Ottawa River by Arnprior was a main route for the fur trade.

== Health care ==
Arnprior has been served since 1945 by the Arnprior and District Memorial Hospital.

== Media ==
The only print media dedicated to Arnprior is the Arnprior Chronicle-Guide. The newspaper was bought by Metroland Media Group in 2011. There is no independent, non-syndicated media coverage of Arnprior available in print form. Oldies 107.7 radio broadcasts from Arnprior to Renfrew, Ontario and is the only Arnprior local radio station.

== Notable people ==
- Craig Cardiff, Juno Award-nominated folk singer
- D'Alton Corry Coleman, president of the Canadian Pacific Railway from 1942 to 1947, attended secondary school in Arnprior while living in the nearby village of Braeside
- John Wesley Dafoe, editor of the Winnipeg Free Press from 1901 to 1944, attended secondary school in Arnprior; the library of Arnprior District High School is named for him
- Dan Fridgen, retired National Hockey League (NHL) player signed by the Hartford Whalers as a free agent on April 5, 1982.
- Rick Hayward, retired NHL player drafted by the Montreal Canadiens
- John Leslie, snowboarder representing Canada at 2014 Winter Paralympics
- Randy Pierce, retired NHL player drafted by the Colorado Rockies
- Gerald Presley, member of the 1965 world champion bobsledding team led by Vic Emery
- David Ridgen, Award-winning filmmaker and host of CBC "true crime" podcasts Someone Knows Something and The Next Call.
- Jim Silye, Canadian Football League (CFL) player with the Calgary Stampeders (1969–75), 1971 Grey Cup Champs; later MP for Calgary Centre from 1993 to 1997

== See also ==
- Arnprior Solar Generating Station
- List of municipalities in Ontario
- List of townships in Ontario
