= Billy Denault =

Canadian politician

Billy Denault MPP
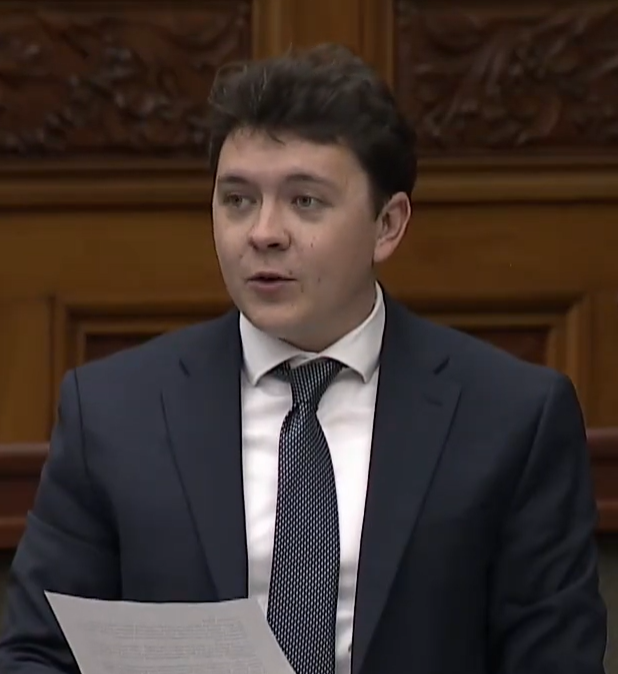
- Denault in 2025

Member of the Ontario Provincial Parliament for Renfrew—Nipissing—Pembroke
- Incumbent
- Assumed office February 27, 2025
- Preceded by: John Yakabuski

Personal details
- Born: 2000 or 2001 (age 25–26)
- Party: Progressive Conservative
- Education: Sprott School of Business, Carleton University (BCom); Sprott School of Business, Carleton University (MAcc) (currently enrolled)
- Profession: Accountant; Politician

William "Billy" Denault MPP (born 2000 or 2001) is a Canadian politician and Progressive Conservative member of Provincial Parliament (MPP) for Renfrew—Nipissing—Pembroke. He previously served as a member of town council in Arnprior as a councillor since 2022, and worked in accounting as a staff accountant at a local accounting firm.

== Early life and education ==
Denault grew up in Arnprior, Ontario. As a youth he volunteered at Camp Wanago and worked for the Town of Arnprior's Recreation Department. He later received the Arnprior Youth of the Year Award.

He earned a Bachelors of Commerce, Majoring in Accounting, from Carleton University.

== Municipal politics ==
Denault was elected as a municipal councillor in Town of Arnprior during the 2022 Ontario Municipal Election.

He served on council until his election to the Legislative Assembly of Ontario in 2025.

== Provincial politics ==
Denault was appointed as the Progressive Conservative Candidate for Renfrew-Nipissing-Pembroke following the retirement of local MPP John Yakabuski. He was elected in the 2025 Ontario Provincial Election.

He serves as Parliamentary Assistant to the Minister of Tourism, Culture and Gaming. Additionally, he is a member of the Standing Committee on Government Agencies and the Standing Committee of Procedure and House Affairs.

== Election results ==
Winning party in each polling division of Renfrew—Nipissing—Pembroke at the 2025 Ontario general election

2025 Ontario general election: Renfrew—Nipissing—Pembroke
Party	Candidate	Votes	%	±%
Progressive Conservative	Billy Denault	24,297	54.83	–6.29
Liberal	Oliver Jacob	9,804	22.13	+12.35
New Democratic	Marshall Buchanan	6,607	14.91	–2.19
Ontario Party	Kevin Holm	1,587	3.58	+0.69
Green	Anna Maria Dolan	1,123	2.53	–1.12
New Blue	Mark Dickson	893	2.02	–2.63
Total valid votes		44,311	99.25	
Total rejected, unmarked and declined ballots		336	0.75	+0.16
Turnout		44,647	48.95	+2.66
Eligible voters		91,213		
Progressive Conservative hold		Swing		–9.32
Source: Elections Ontario
