= Camp Pathfinder =

Ontario Boys' camp

Coordinates: 45.565626°N 78.643055°W

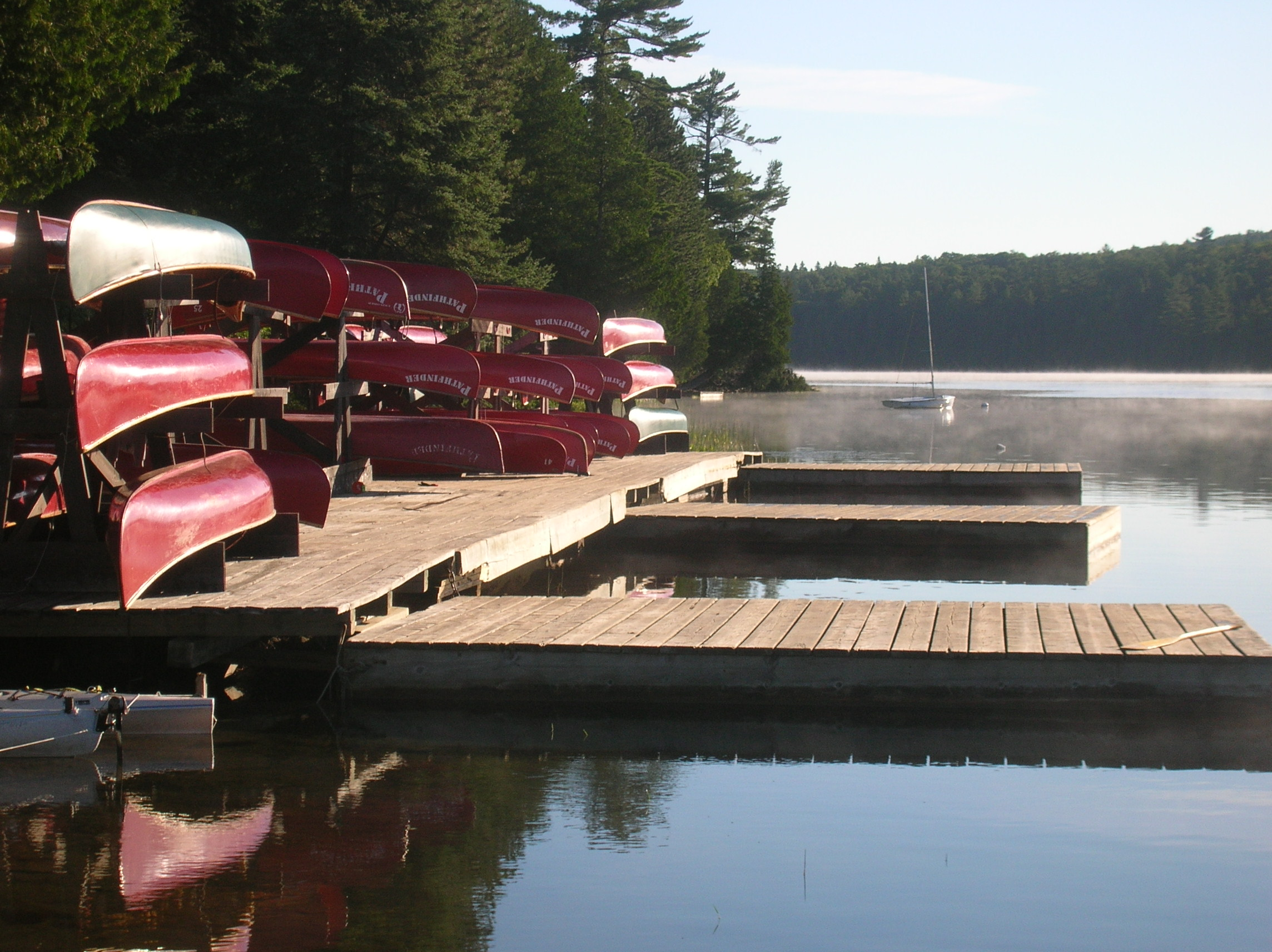
- Interactive map of Camp Pathfinder
- Location: Camp Pathfinder Island, Source Lake, Algonquin Provincial Park, Ontario, Canada
- Created: 1914
- Operator: Will Hopkins (director)
- Website: www.camppathfinder.com

Camp Pathfinder is a boys' Summer camp in Algonquin Provincial Park, Ontario, Canada. The camp is best known for its canoe tripping program. Pathfinder follows a tradition of using wood and canvas canoes. Several other camps in Algonquin and elsewhere follow a similar tradition of tripping with, building and restoring canvas canoes. Pathfinder's canoes are painted a distinctive bright red.

The current owners are Will Hopkins -- himself once a Pathfinder camper -- and his wife Diane. Will serves as Camp Director. The two were "litigants" in an episode of the Judge John Hodgman podcast where they argued over a communal outhouse used at the camp.

== History ==
Camp Pathfinder was founded in 1914 by William Bennett and Franklin Gray. In 1922, the camp was sold to Herman J. "Chief" Norton, who became one of Pathfinder's most influential owners. Pathfinder was almost shut down or sold to the Ontario Provincial Government when the government told Norton the lease for the camp (and the others in the park as well) would not be renewed. The government later renewed the lease and the camp (and all the others in the park) remained in operation. Since then, owners or co-owners have included Frank J. Horton, Bill Swift, Roy Thrall, Mac Rand, Glenn Arthurs, and Michael Sladden. Camp Pathfinder is located on Source Lake, in Algonquin Provincial Park, just more than a mile away from Highway 60. Source Lake is an access point to the Algonquin Park canoe route system. There are no campsites on Source Lake. There are, however, a few residential cabins and the camp itself on the lake.

The camp is located on an island in the lake, commonly referred to as Camp Pathfinder Island or "CPI". On the opening days of each session, the whole camp meets at the new council ring, and a meeting introducing the camp session is held. This meeting, and other aspects of the camp, have a number of traditions. The camp also features a ropes course and climbing walls.

Recently, the camp completed its 110th season.

== Canoe tripping ==
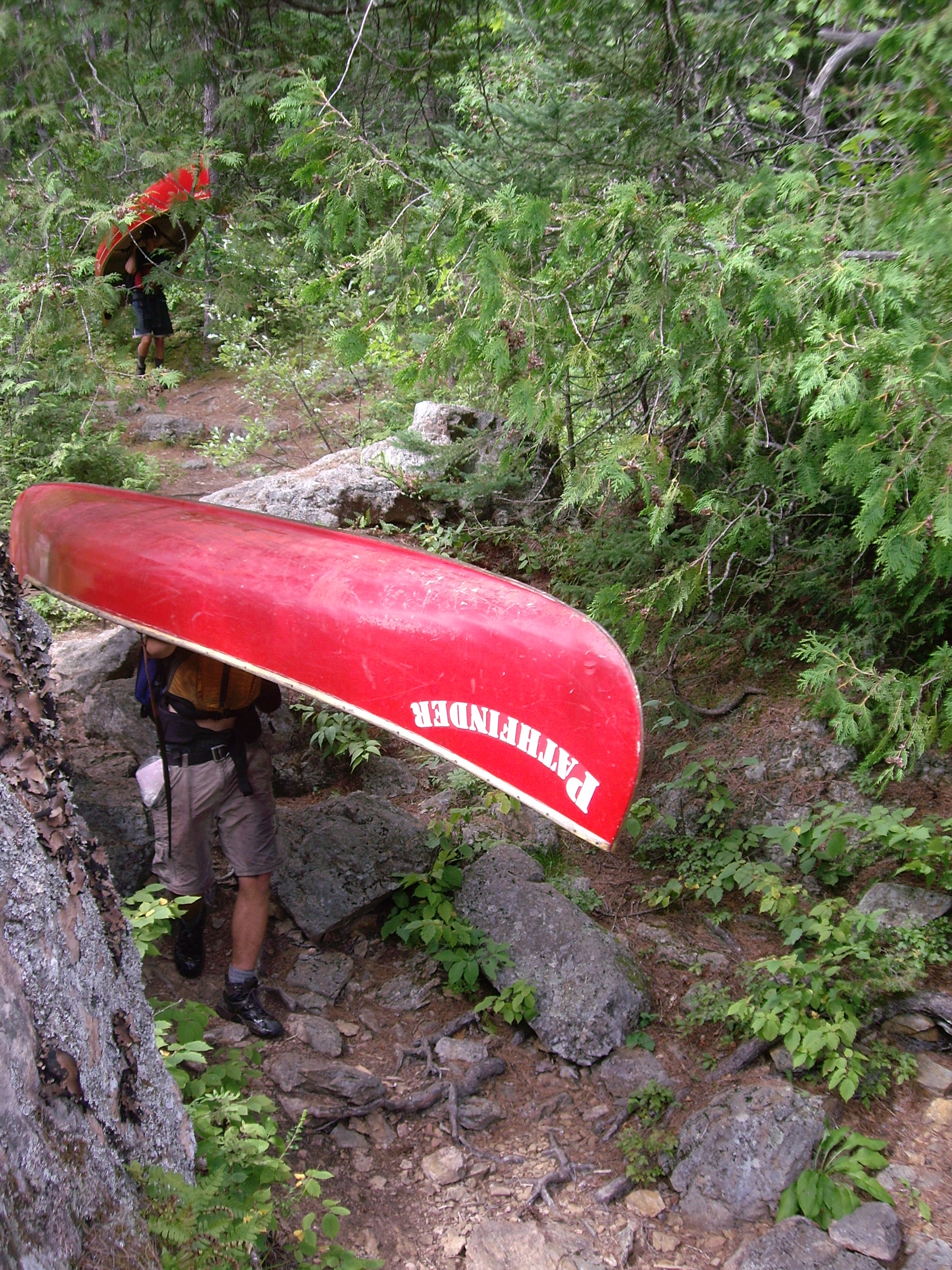
Pathfinder Canoe Portage

Pathfinder has an extensive canoe tripping program. Trip duration and destination vary by the age group of the campers on the trip.

The camp maintains it own fleet of 53 cedar canvas canoes with its own onsite canoe workshop built in 2010. Each canoe is dedicated to an important member of the camp's history with each tripping staff member given the responsibility of maintain one for the duration of the season. Most of the canoes in the fleet were built by local canoe builder Jack Hurley. Since 2010, Warren Mcdermott, Joe "Jerry" Egan, and Dave Statten have worked as the camp's in-house canoe builders working to both maintain and build new canoes for the camp.

The youngest campers normally stay within the boundaries of Algonquin Park or very close to it. The older campers ('Bears' or 'AA's') venture on longer and more challenging trips with varying destinations. Some trip destinations outside of Algonquin Park have included:

- Albany River
- Ashewig River
- Attawapiskat River–James Bay
- Big East River
- Bloodvein River–Lake Winnipeg
- Broadback River
- Coulonge River–Noire River
- Dumoine River
- Harricana River
- Lady Evelyn River–Temagami River
- Lake Superior–Michipicoten River–Missinaibi River–James Bay
- Lake Temagami
- Magnetawan River
- Missinaibi River–Moose River–James Bay
- Missinaibi River–Lake Superior Provincial Park–Sand River–Lake Superior
- Nastapoka river
- Mistassibi River
- Rupert River
- Severn River–Fawn River–Pipestone River
- White River–Pukaskwa–Lake Superior
- Winisk River
- Clearwater River
