= Renfrew—Nipissing—Pembroke (provincial electoral district) =

Provincial electoral district in Ontario, Canada

Coordinates: 45.63°N 77.41°W

Ontario electoral district
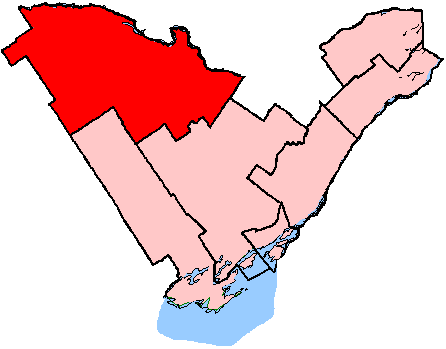
- Renfrew—Nipissing—Pembroke shown within the Eastern Ontario region

Provincial electoral district
- Legislature: Legislative Assembly of Ontario
MPP
Billy Denault
Progressive Conservative
- District created: 1999
- First contested: 1999
- Last contested: 2025

Demographics
- Population (2016): 103,495
- Electors (2018): 81,550
- Area (km²): 12,385
- Pop. density (per km²): 8.4
- Census division(s): Nipissing, Renfrew
- Census subdivision(s): Arnprior, Bonnechere Valley, Deep River, Laurentian Valley, Madawaska Valley, McNab/Braeside, Pembroke, Petawawa, Renfrew, Whitewater Region

Renfrew—Nipissing—Pembroke is a provincial electoral district in Ontario, Canada, that has been represented in the Legislative Assembly of Ontario since 1999. It is currently represented by Billy Denault of the Progressive Conservative Party.

Renfrew—Nipissing—Pembroke includes all of Renfrew County and a small section of Nipissing District around Algonquin Provincial Park. The largest community in the riding is the city of Pembroke; other communities include Arnprior, Barry's Bay, Chalk River, Cobden, Deep River, Eganville, Killaloe, Petawawa and Renfrew.

The population of the riding in 2006 was 98,803.

== Geography ==
The riding consists of

- the entire County of Renfrew; and
- the part of the Territorial District of Nipissing lying south and east of and including the South Algonquin Township (formerly Airy) and the unincorporated geographical townships of Deacon, Lister, Anglin, Dickson, Preston (Voters residing in Nipissing District make up only 1.5% of voter roll)

== Geographical evolution ==
The provincial electoral district by this name created in 1996 through the Ontario's adoption of the Fewer Politicians Act, which made the name and boundaries of provincial electoral districts identical to those of their federal counterparts. The district name was first introduced in federal Representation Order 1976 and reunited all voters residing in Renfrew country back into one electoral district when it was first contested in 1979. The boundaries of the Renfrew—Nipissing—Pembroke federal electoral district was last adjusted by Representation Order, 1987 and has essentially remained the same since (though it has been renamed Algonquin—Renfrew—Pembroke by Representation Order, 2023.)

In adopting the federal boundary in 1996, the newly created provincial district of Renfrew—Nipissing—Pembroke was essentially the successor district of Renfrew North, one of the districts in continual existence since Canadian Confederation, taking in its entirety. In addition, it also received just shy of a third of the voters previously in Lanark–Renfrew, which had absorbed Arnprior and the town of Renfrew when the provincial district of Renfrew South was eliminated in 1987, plus a geographically vast but sparsely populated portion of the Nipissing District, consist of the South Algonquin Township and unincorporated areas around the Algonquin Provincial Park.

=== Representation of Renfrew prior to 1999 ===
Renfrew county elected its own provincial representative for the first time in 1854 to the 5th Parliament of the Province of Canada. Upon Confederation, its representation increased to two seats in the Ontario legislature (along with two seats in the House of Commons.) The boundaries that divided Renfrew North and South provincial ridings, as defined in the British North America Act, 1867, remained essentially unchanged for the following century until 1975.

By the census of 1971, the north riding had a population almost 50% greater that the south riding. To rebalance representation, the area south of Pembroke such as Whitewater and Wilberforce were redistributed to Renfrew South prior to the 1975 election. The south riding did not survive for much longer however. When it was eliminated in 1987, Arnprior and the town of Renfrew (along with their surrounding areas) were assigned to Lanark–Renfrew, while its vast geography that was less populated was assumed by Renfrew North.

== Political history ==
While on paper the provincial electoral district was first contested in the 1999 Ontario election, its political history can be easily traced as it is the sole successor of:

- The electoral division of Renfrew from 1854 to 1867
- Both the north and south ridings of Renfrew from Confederation to 1987
- Renfrew North from 1987 to its debut in the 1999 Ontario election.

Since the turn of the millennium, Renfrew—Nipissing—Pembroke has earned the reputation as among the two or three most Conservative electoral districts in Ontario. In 2000, it returned one of only three non-Liberal MP in Ontario, and had reliably returned Cheryl Gallant, a controversial social conservative, as MP ever since. When veteran Liberal MPP Sean Conway, a former cabinet minister who represented the riding since his 20s, retired in the provincial election in 2003, local voters here rejected his protégée and opted for John Yakabuski, a son of a former Conservative representative who was in office when Conway was in cabinet, making this riding the only loss suffered by the Liberals in the election that put them back in government with a massive majority. Prior to that however, Conway held the provincial seat for over quarter of a century, while the Liberals' hold on the federal north riding was unbroken from before the second world war.

=== Notable representative ===
The two electoral district of Renfrew county have been represented by some of the most powerful and influential cabinet ministers of their time.

- Frank Latchford, a prominent player in the Liberal Party circles in Ottawa who have never ran for public office prior, he was brought into cabinet by newly minted Premier George Ross as Commissioner of Public Works in 1899, and parachuted into running in Renfrew South where the Liberal incumbent won the previous election by a massive 1,400 votes margin (out of 4,400). Latchford was elected, with a reduced margin and not without an acrimonious campaign over in which his outsider status was made much issue of. He served as Attorney General in the final year of the 34 year Liberal reign, before being defeated by his erstwhile by-election rival.
- Thomas McGarry was the erstwhile rival Latchford defeated in the 1899 by-election. He got his revenge when the 34-year Liberal reign came to an end in 1905 and replaced Latchford as the member for South Renfrew. He won re-election in 1908, and was returned by acclamation in 1911 and 1914 and was appointed Treasurer of the Hearst ministry soon after. Like the predecessor he bested, McGarry also served till the bitter end of a regime and lost his own seat when the government was ousted.
- Edward Arunah Dunlop, son of Arunah Dunlop who represented North Renfrew briefly before dying in office, was the Conservative member for North Renfrew over three different stints between 1903 and 1934, was a prominent member of the Toronto business community while he was not in public office. He was also twice acclaimed to the seat (in 1911 and 1929) and was made a minister without portfolio by Howard Ferguson before being promoted Treasurer a few months before Ferguson retired. Like the two mentioned above, he served under a new leader who failed to reviving the governing party's fortune. Unlike the other two however, he did not served until the government's defeat but died a few months earlier, on New Year's Day 1934.
- Sean Conway, a grandson of Thomas Murray who represented Renfrew North over three stints as MPP followed by two stints as MP, was elected in 1975 to the provincial seat his grandfather first won more than a hundred years earlier, and held onto it for 24 years, before defeating an neighbouring member to become the inaugural member of this new electoral district. Conway was only twenty-four when he ended the Progressive Conservatives' three-decade grip of Renfrew North. Ten years later in 1985, he was one of the three Liberal negotiators who brokered the governing accord with the NDP that ended the Progressive Conservatives' four-decade grip of the provincial government, and was among the most powerful ministers in the Peterson ministry that followed.
- John Yakabuski, a son of long time Renfrew South member Paul Yakabuski, succeeded his second cousin Conway as this riding's member, and after four terms in opposition, was brought into cabinet when the Conservative returned to power in 2018 under Doug Ford. Initially appointed transportation minister, he was dodged by allegations of conflict of interests and was shuffled within a few months, and was dropped from cabinet in 2021.

== Members of Provincial Parliament ==
Renfrew—Nipissing—Pembroke
Assembly	Years	Member	Party
Adoption of the federal boundaries of Renfrew—Nipissing—Pembroke effected the combination of Renfrew North (100%) and Lanark–Renfrew (32%)
37th	1999–2003	Sean Conway	Liberal
38th	2003–2007	John Yakabuski	Progressive Conservative
39th	2007–2011	John Yakabuski	Progressive Conservative
40th	2011–2014	John Yakabuski	Progressive Conservative
41st	2014–2018	John Yakabuski	Progressive Conservative
42nd	2018–2022	John Yakabuski	Progressive Conservative
43rd	2022–2025	John Yakabuski	Progressive Conservative
44th	2025–present	Billy Denault	Progressive Conservative

== Election results ==
Winning party in each polling division of Renfrew—Nipissing—Pembroke at the 2025 Ontario general election

2025 Ontario general election
Party	Candidate	Votes	%	±%
Progressive Conservative	Billy Denault	24,297	54.83	–6.29
Liberal	Oliver Jacob	9,804	22.13	+12.35
New Democratic	Marshall Buchanan	6,607	14.91	–2.19
Ontario Party	Kevin Holm	1,587	3.58	+0.69
Green	Anna Maria Dolan	1,123	2.53	–1.12
New Blue	Mark Dickson	893	2.02	–2.63
Total valid votes		44,311	99.25	
Total rejected, unmarked and declined ballots		336	0.75	+0.16
Turnout		44,647	48.95	+2.66
Eligible voters		91,213		
Progressive Conservative hold		Swing		–9.32
Source: Elections Ontario

Winning party in each polling division of Renfrew—Nipissing—Pembroke at the 2022 Ontario general election

2022 Ontario general election
Party	Candidate	Votes	%	±%	Expenditures
Progressive Conservative	John Yakabuski	24,563	61.12	–8.07	$37,426
New Democratic	Kurt Stoll	6,872	17.10	+0.36	$29,868
Liberal	Oliver A. Jacob	3,928	9.77	+0.02	$1,685
New Blue	Thomas O'Connor	1,868	4.65	–	$8,416
Green	Anna Dolan	1,470	3.66	+0.68	$455
Ontario Party	Kade MacWilliams	1,162	2.89	–	$2,875
Confederation of Regions	Murray Reid	325	0.81	+0.03	$642
Total valid votes/expense limit		40,188	99.41	–	$122,280
Total rejected, unmarked and declined ballots		239	0.59	–0.47	
Turnout		40,427	46.29	–13.45	
Eligible voters		87,343			
Progressive Conservative hold		Swing		–4.22	
Source: Elections Ontario

2018 Ontario general election
Party	Candidate	Votes	%	±%
Progressive Conservative	John Yakabuski	33,350	69.19	+8.13
New Democratic	Ethel Lavalley	8,066	16.73	+2.27
Liberal	Jackie Agnew	4,701	9.75	–9.35
Green	Anna Dolan	1,436	2.98	–0.26
Confederation of Regions	Murray Reid	373	0.77	–0.41
Libertarian	Jesse Wood	273	0.57	–
Total valid votes		48,199	98.94	
Total rejected, unmarked and declined ballots		517	1.06	–0.06
Turnout		48,716	59.74	+5.42
Eligible voters		81,550		
Progressive Conservative hold		Swing		+2.93
Source: Elections Ontario

2014 Ontario general election
Party	Candidate	Votes	%	±%
Progressive Conservative	John Yakabuski	25,241	61.07	–9.72
Liberal	Rod Boileau	7,897	19.11	+3.12
New Democratic	Brian Dougherty	5,978	14.46	+3.49
Green	Benjamin Wright	1,337	3.23	+1.76
Confederation of Regions	Murray Reid	489	1.18	+0.39
Independent	Chad Beckwith-Smith	392	0.95	–
Total valid votes		41,334	98.88	
Total rejected, unmarked and declined ballots		470	1.12	+0.85
Turnout		41,804	54.32	+1.63
Eligible voters		76,956		
Progressive Conservative hold		Swing		–6.42
Source: Elections Ontario

2011 Ontario general election
Party	Candidate	Votes	%	±%
Progressive Conservative	John Yakabuski	27,594	70.78	+8.44
Liberal	John O'Leary	6,231	15.98	–8.74
New Democratic	Brian Dougherty	4,277	10.97	+3.39
Green	Kyle Jones	574	1.47	–2.96
Confederation of Regions	Murray Reid	309	0.79	+0.60
Total valid votes		38,985	99.73	
Total rejected, unmarked and declined ballots		107	0.27	–0.34
Turnout		39,092	52.69	–4.86
Eligible voters		74,191		
Progressive Conservative hold		Swing		+8.59
Source: Elections Ontario

2007 Ontario general election
Party	Candidate	Votes	%	±%
Progressive Conservative	John Yakabuski	24,975	62.34	+18.20
Liberal	Sean Kelly	9,905	24.72	–17.94
New Democratic	Felicite Stairs	3,038	7.58	–4.08
Green	Mark MacKenzie	1,777	4.44	+2.90
Family Coalition	Bruce Dean	292	0.73	–
Confederation of Regions	Tilton Beaumont	76	0.19	–
Total valid votes		40,063	99.39	
Total rejected, unmarked and declined ballots		247	0.61	+0.07
Turnout		40,310	57.55	–6.42
Eligible voters		70,042		
Progressive Conservative hold		Swing		+18.07
Source: Elections Ontario

2003 Ontario general election
Party	Candidate	Votes	%	±%
Progressive Conservative	John Yakabuski	19,274	44.14	+3.76
Liberal	Derek Nighbor	18,629	42.66	–10.69
New Democratic	Felicite Stairs	5,092	11.66	+6.44
Green	Chris Paul Walker	671	1.54	+0.88
Total valid votes		43,666	99.46	
Total rejected, unmarked and declined ballots		238	0.54	+0.08
Turnout		43,904	63.97	+2.74
Eligible voters		68,634		
Progressive Conservative gain from Liberal		Swing		+7.22
Source: Elections Ontario

1999 Ontario general election
Party	Candidate	Votes	%
Liberal	Sean Conway	23,435	53.35
Progressive Conservative	Leo Jordan	17,738	40.38
New Democratic	Gerry Boyer	2,295	5.22
Green	Thane C. Heins	287	0.65
Natural Law	André Giordano	172	0.39
Total valid votes		43,927	99.53
Total rejected, unmarked and declined ballots		206	0.47
Turnout		44,133	61.23
Eligible voters		72,080	
Liberal pickup new district.			
Source: Elections Ontario

== Student vote results ==
2018 Renfrew—Nipissing—Pembroke student vote result
Affiliation	Candidate	Votes	%
Progressive Conservative	John Yakabuski	1,374	51.87
New Democratic	Ethel Lavalley	463	17.48
Liberal	Jackie Agnew	326	12.31
Green	Anna Dolan	296	11.17
Libertarian	Jesse Wood	100	3.78
Confederation of Regions	Murray Reid	90	3.40

== 2007 Electoral Reform Referendum ==
2007 Ontario electoral reform referendum
Side	Votes	%
First Past the Post	28,818	74.5
Mixed member proportional	9,859	25.5
Total valid votes	38,677	100.0

== See also ==
- List of Ontario provincial electoral districts
- Canadian provincial electoral districts
