= O'Brien Theatre (Arnprior) =

Coordinates: 45.4345°N 76.3535°W

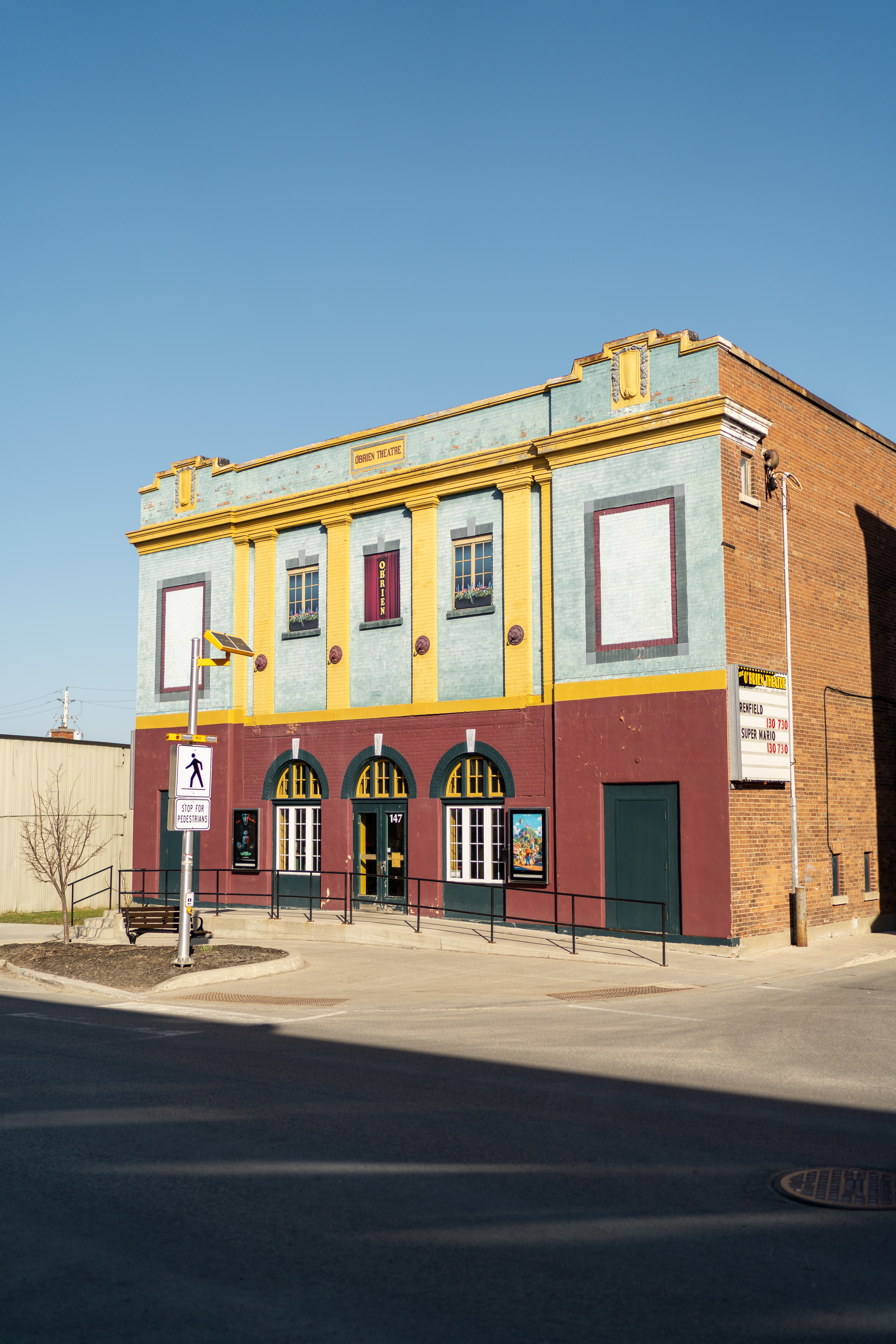
The O'Brien Theatre

The O'Brien Theatre is a historic cinema in the town of Arnprior, Ontario. Arnprior's first cinema opened on the site in 1906, and the current building dates from 1919. It was originally both a cinema and venue for vaudeville performances. With the growth in popularity of films the building renovated and became a full-time cinema in 1929. It was owned by the Ottawa Valley Amusement Corporation, which owned a number of cinemas in the Ottawa Valley. Several other towns in the area had O'Brien cinemas, including Pembroke (Demolished in 2000) Almonte (Sold in 1970 to become the Royal Bank, currently a thrift store.) The equally historic O'Brien Theatre in Renfrew, Ontario is the only other still open, and both theatres are today open for business. The Arnprior O'Brien theatre is owned by Kevin Marshall, and is no longer affiliated with the Renfrew O'Brien. Not part of any of the major theatre chains, the O'Brien has been owned by several small businesses and individuals over the last decades. In 2000 the theatre was completely refurbished and restored to its 1930s appearance, but with the added second screen on the upper level. In 2012, a second large investment was made to update all of the equipment to Christie digital projectors and Doremi servers, providing new sound and picture. Currently running first release Hollywood film, also film booked through TIFF (Toronto International Film Festival) and "Live at the Met" Operas.

== See also ==
- Theatre organ
