= Waterway parks =

Park designation in Ontario, Canada

Waterway Parks is the designation given by the Provincial Parks System of Ontario, Canada, for parks which are river corridors that provide canoeists with high-quality recreation and historical river travel.

== See also ==
- List of Ontario parks
