= Opeongo River =

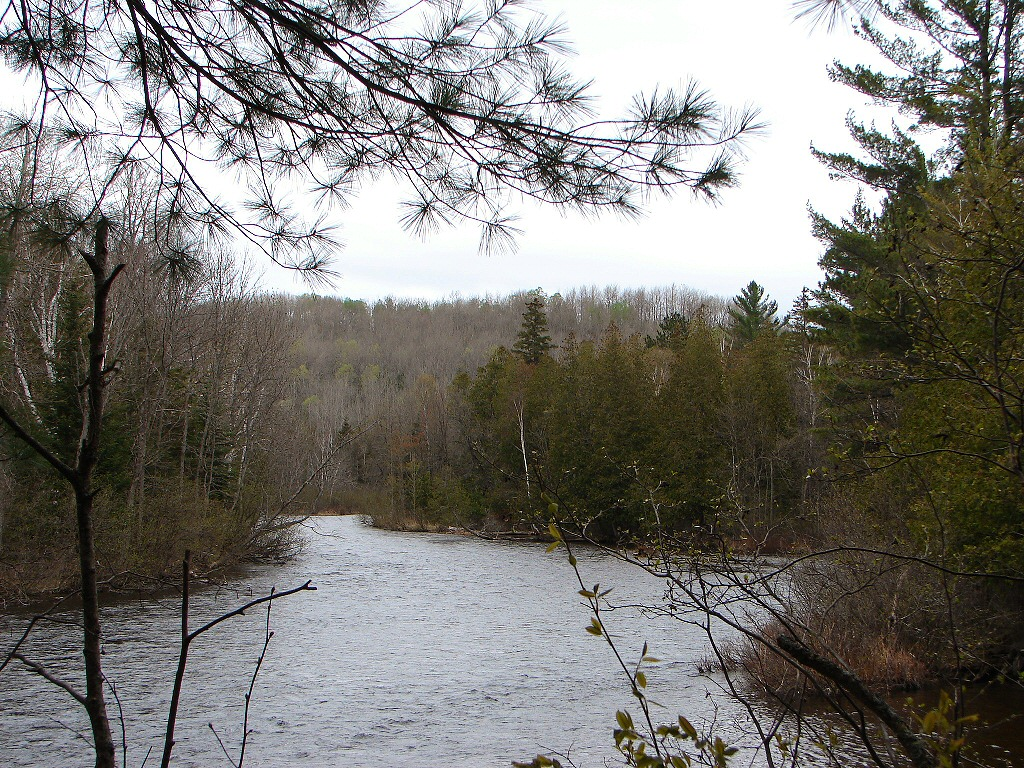
- Opeongo River near the confluence with the Aylen River

- Location of the mouth of the Opeongo River in southern Ontario

Location
- Country: Canada
- Ontario: Ontario
- Region: Northeastern Ontario
- District: Nipissing

Physical characteristics
- Source: Opeongo Lake
  - location: Preston Township, Unorganized South Nipissing District; in Algonquin Provincial Park
  - coordinates: 45°41′55″N 78°16′28″W
  - elevation: 403 m (1,322 ft)
- Mouth: Madawaska River
  - location: East of Madawaska village, South Algonquin Township
  - coordinates: 45°30′22″N 77°56′45″W
  - elevation: 311 m (1,020 ft)

Basin features
- River system: Saint Lawrence River drainage basin

The Opeongo River is a river in the Saint Lawrence River drainage basin in Nipissing District in northeastern Ontario, Canada. The river is entirely within Algonquin Provincial Park and Opeongo River Provincial Park, except for a small portion around Victoria Lake, and is a left tributary of the Madawaska River.

== Course ==
The river begins in Algonquin Provincial Park at the outflow from Annie Bay on the East Arm of Opeongo Lake in geographic Preston Township, in the Unorganized South Part of Nipissing District, controlled by the Opeongo Lake Dam and flows southeast to Booth Lake. It exits the lake east controlled by the Booth Lake Dam, enters geographic Clancy Township, exits Algonquin Provincial Park into Opeongo River Provincial Park and reaches Victoria Lake. The river leaves the lake at the northeast over a dam and continues southeast, passes from Unorganized South Nipissing District into the geographic Dickens Township in the municipality of South Algonquin, passes through a series of rapids, takes in the left tributary Aylen River, turns southwest, and empties into Bark Lake on the Madawaska River, at the Ontario Highway 60 bridge and east of the community of Madawaska. The Madawaska River flows via the Ottawa River to the Saint Lawrence River.

== Recreation ==
The river is used for recreational canoeing and kayaking.

== Tributaries ==
- Aylen River (left)
- Victoria Lake
  - McNevin Creek (right)
- Shall Lake
  - Oram Creek (right)
  - Shall Creek (left)
- Crotch Lake
  - Shirley Creek (left)
  - Robin Creek (left)
- Bridle Creek (left)
- Booth Lake
  - Rumley Creek (right)
  - Cob Creek (right)
  - McCarthy Creek (right)
  - Chipmunk Creek (left)
- Tip Up Creek (left)

== See also ==
- List of rivers of Ontario
