= Madawaska River (Ontario) =

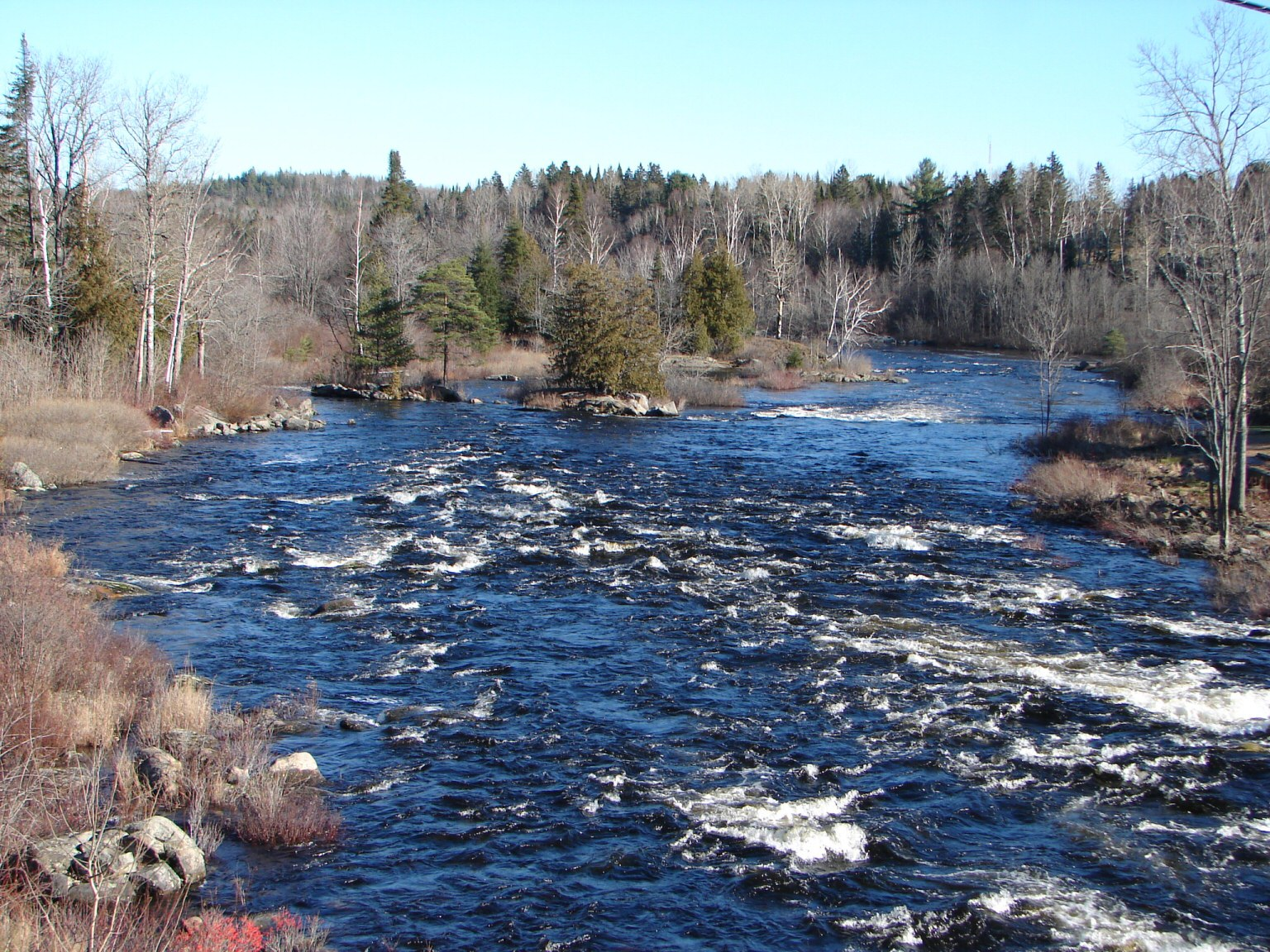
- Upper Madawaska River at Whitney

- Location within Southern Ontario
- Etymology: From name of Algonquian band "Matouweskarini" meaning "people of the shallows"

Location
- Country: Canada
- Province: Ontario
- Regions: Eastern Ontario; Central Ontario; Northeastern Ontario
- County/District: Renfrew County; Nipissing District

Physical characteristics
- Source: Source Lake
  - location: Canisbay Township, Unorganized South Part, Nipissing District
  - coordinates: 45°33′52″N 78°37′56″W
  - elevation: 450 m (1,480 ft)
- Mouth: Ottawa River
  - location: Arnprior, Renfrew County
  - coordinates: 45°26′35″N 76°20′56″W
  - elevation: 70 m (230 ft)
- Length: 230 km (140 mi)
- Basin size: 8,470 km^{2} (3,270 sq mi)
- Discharge
  - average: 85 m^{3}/s (3,000 cu ft/s)

Basin features
- Progression: Ottawa River→ St. Lawrence River→ Gulf of St. Lawrence
- River system: Ottawa River drainage basin
- Tributaries
  - left: Opeongo River
  - right: York River

The Madawaska River is the largest tributary of the Ottawa River in the St. Lawrence River drainage basin in Ontario, Canada. The river is 230 km (143 mi) long and drains an area of 8,470 km^{2} (3,270 sq mi). Its name comes from an Algonquian band of the region known as "Matouweskarini", meaning "people of the shallows".

== Geography ==
The Madawaska River rises at Source Lake in geographic Canisbay Township in the Unorganized South Part of Nipissing District, in the highlands of southern Algonquin Park. It flows east, dropping 380 m (1,247 ft) before emptying into the Ottawa River at Arnprior.

=== Tributaries ===
- Opeongo River
- York River

=== Lakes and reservoirs ===
The lower portion of the Madawaska River supports several large lakes, including:

- Centennial Lake
- Black Donald Lake
- Calabogie Lake
- Madawaska Reservoir (Arnprior Head Pond)
- Kamaniskeg Lake

Bark Lake and Kamaniskeg Lake divide the Madawaska river into three sections known as the Upper, Middle, and Lower Madawaska.

== History ==
In the late 19th century, the river was used to transport logs from the forested areas surrounding the river. Beginning in the 1960s, the river was used to generate hydroelectric power. Undammed sections of the river are also used for canoeing, kayaking and recreational fishing.

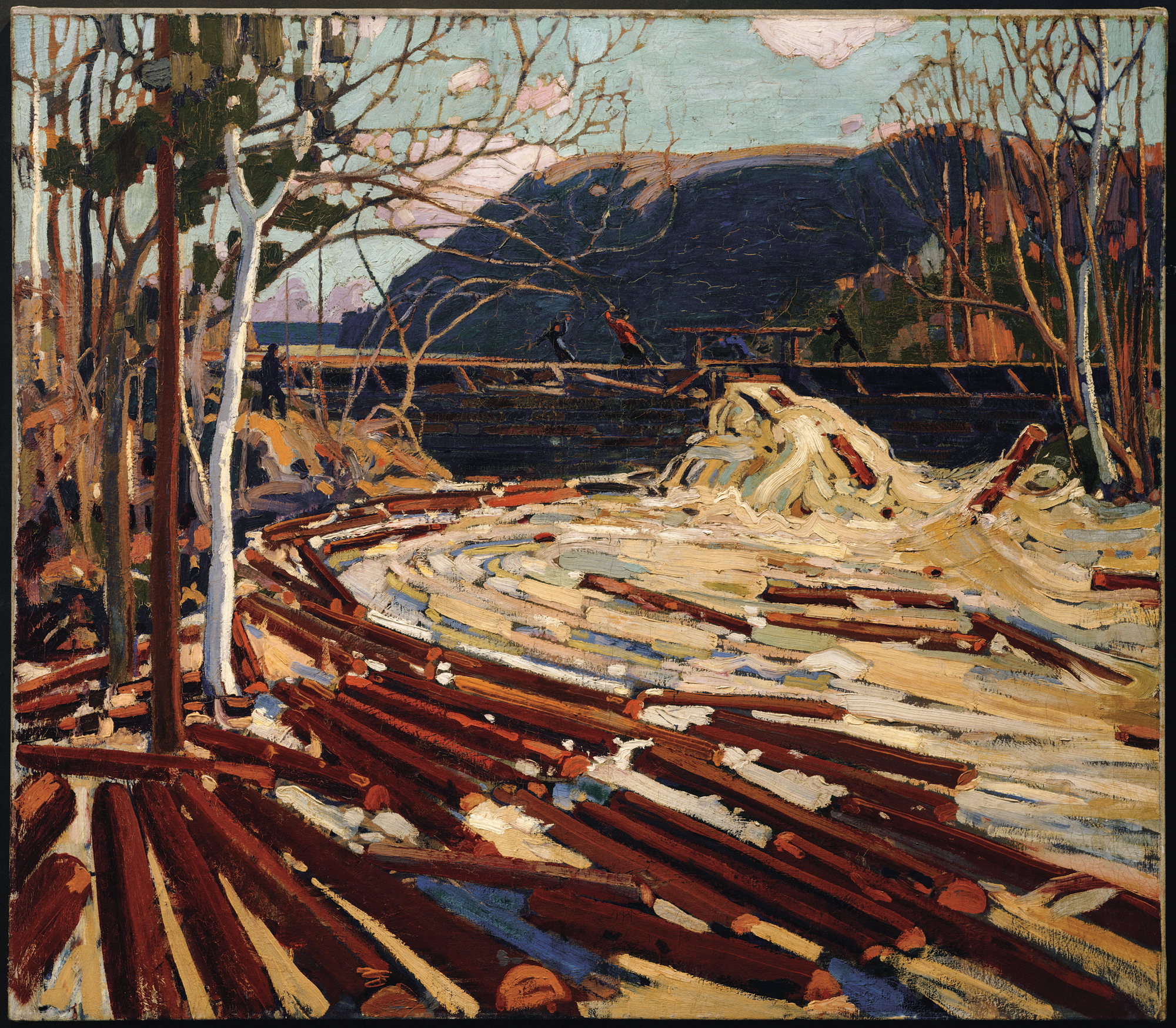
Tom Thomson, The Drive, winter 1916-17. University of Guelph Collection, Art Gallery of Guelph

Around 1916, artist Tom Thomson followed the log drive down the river and painted The Drive (1916–17).

== Fauna ==
The most common species of game fish found in this river include walleye (yellow pickerel), northern pike, muskellunge, smallmouth bass, and largemouth bass.

== Hydroelectric Power ==
Ontario Power Generation (OPG) has 5 stations on the Madawaska.

OPG Madawaska Stations
Station	Year	Capacity	Units
Mountain Chute	1967	170 MW	2
Barrett Chute	1942	176 MW	4
Calabogie	1917	5 MW	2
Stewartville	1948	182 MW	5
Arnprior	1976	82 MW	2

In June 2002 sluice gates at the Barrett Chute Generating Station were accidentally opened, killing two people, and injuring seven. OPG and two employees were charged with criminal negligence. Procedures at the plant were reviewed, and fencing added or repaired.

The Calabogie station is being upgraded in 2022 to double capacity from 5 MW to 10 MW. The original station was badly damaged by a tornado in September 2018. Clean up was completed in 2020. The project is expected to cost 100 million dollars.

== Provincial parks ==
Two sections of the river are designated and protected as provincial waterway parks:

- Upper Madawaska River Provincial Park, between Whitney and Madawaska; 10.85 km^{2} (4.19 sq mi).
- Lower Madawaska River Provincial Park, between Latchford Bridge and Griffith; 12 km^{2} (5 sq mi).

Both parks are administered by Ontario Parks but are non-operating, meaning there are no visitor facilities or services available. Both are ideal for whitewater canoeing.

== See also ==
- Bonnechere River - nearby river with similar characteristics
- List of Ontario rivers

== Sources ==
- McMurtrie, Jeffrey (2008). "Algonquin Provincial Park and the Haliburton Highlands". Wikimedia Commons. Archived from the original on 2011-06-29.
- Map 9 (PDF) (Map). 1 : 700,000. Official road map of Ontario. Ministry of Transportation of Ontario. 2010-01-01.
- Map 10 (PDF) (Map). 1 : 700,000. Official road map of Ontario. Ministry of Transportation of Ontario. 2010-01-01.
- Restructured municipalities - Ontario map #5 (Map). Restructuring Maps of Ontario. Ontario Ministry of Municipal Affairs and Housing. 2006. Archived from the original on 2020-05-11.
