= Barry's Bay =

Community in Ontario, Canada

- Unincorporated community
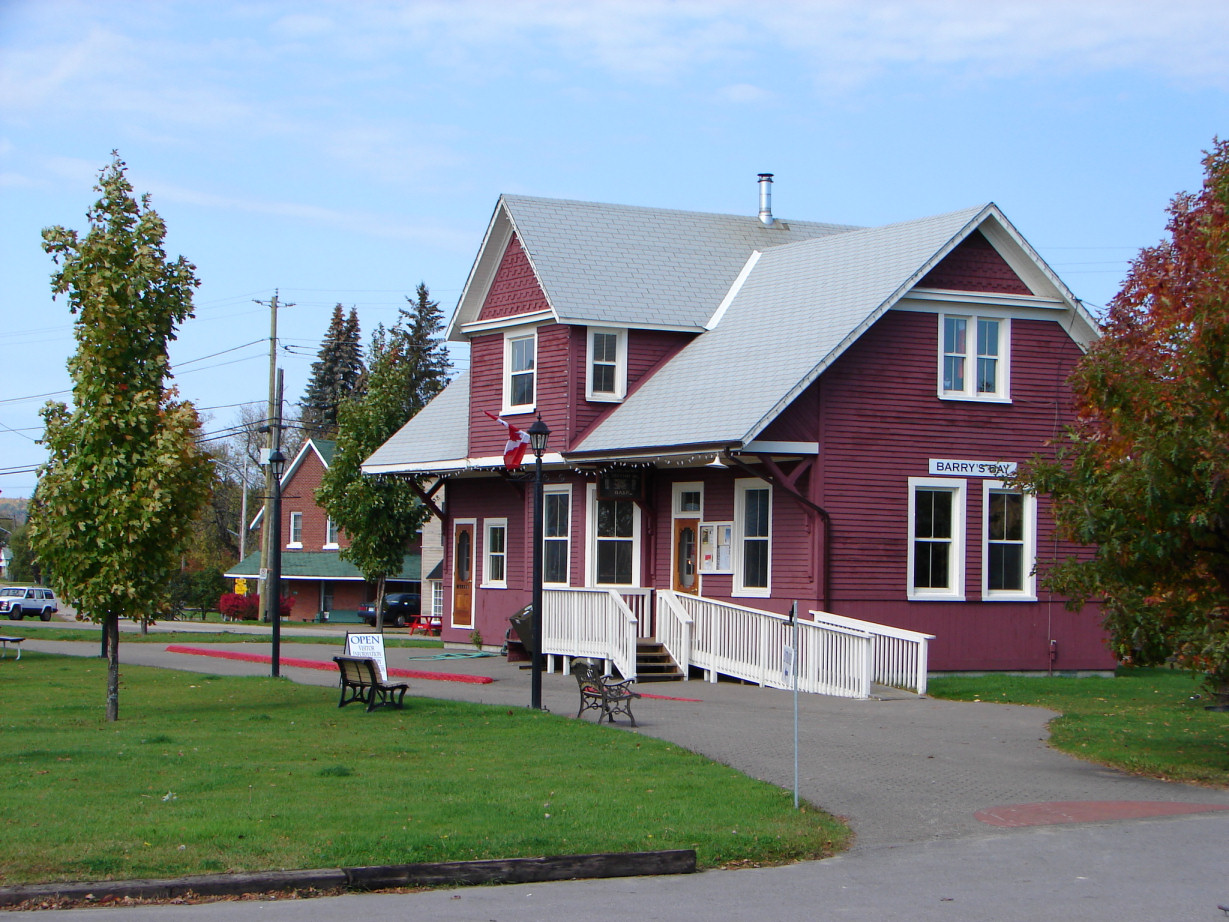
- Barry's Bay visitor centre and former train station

- Location within Southern Ontario
- Coordinates: 45°29′18″N 77°40′44″W
- Country: Canada
- Province: Ontario
- County: Renfrew
- Township municipality: Madawaska Valley
- Incorporated: 1933
- Amalgamated: 2001

Government
  - Type: Unincorporated

Area
  - Land: 2.25 km^{2} (0.87 sq mi)

Population (2021)
  - Total: 1,084
  - Density: 481.3/km^{2} (1,247/sq mi)
- Time zone: UTC-5 (Eastern Time Zone)
  - Summer (DST): UTC-4 (Eastern Time Zone)
- Postal code: K0J 1BO
- Area codes: 613, 343
- Provincial highways: Highway 60
- County roads: County Road 62; County Road 69

Barry's Bay is a community in the township of Madawaska Valley, Ontario, Canada, located two hours west of Ottawa on the shores of Kamaniskeg Lake, with a 2021 population of 1,084.

== History ==
The Algonquin people named the area Kuaenash Ne-ishing, meaning beautiful bay. They used it as a rendezvous area, often hosting pow wow gatherings.

The first efforts by the authorities of the British colony of Upper Canada to survey the waterways of this area came in 1847, when mapmaker James Haslett visited the area. Haslett noted the presence of an Irish farmer named William Byers living in the area, which may have been transcribed as "Barry's", giving the name Barry's Bay on Haslett's maps. Later residents developed the more colloquial back story that the first permanent structure was built in the late 1850s by a James Barry, a foreman for a lumber company, which the lumberjacks working under Barry took to calling Barry's Camp on the Bay, shortened to Barry's Bay. Together, the details acknowledge the fact that the earliest settlers were loggers and farmers.

By the late 1850s, the authorities of Upper Canada looked to expand colonization in this region by building the Opeongo Line, a series of roads extending westward from Renfrew. Between 1858 and 1910, the area attracted settlers of Irish and Polish descent, with the 10 kilometres (6.2 mi) from Wilno to Barry's Bay, in particular, receiving a number of Polish settlers.

The Barry's Bay post office was established in 1876, and the town was officially incorporated in 1933.

The town served as a standby base for the Canadian Military during World War II. Local workers and lumbermen were reformed into soldiers to help contribute to the war efforts of Canada.

== Demographics ==
Historical census populations – Barry's Bay

Year	Pop.	±%
1941	1,198	—
1951	1,218	+1.7%
1956	1,366	+12.2%
1961	1,439	+5.3%
1966	1,388	−3.5%
1971	1,432	+3.2%

Year	Pop.	±%
1976	1,266	−11.6%
1981	1,216	−3.9%
1986	1,141	−6.2%
1991	1,088	−4.6%
1996	1,086	−0.2%
2001	1,115	+2.7%

Year	Pop.	±%
2006	1,265	+13.5%
2011	1,241	−1.9%
2016	1,259	+1.5%
2021	1,084	−13.9%

2011 Population based on revised count. 2006 Population count is adjusted for boundary changes.
Source: Statistics Canada

== Landmarks ==
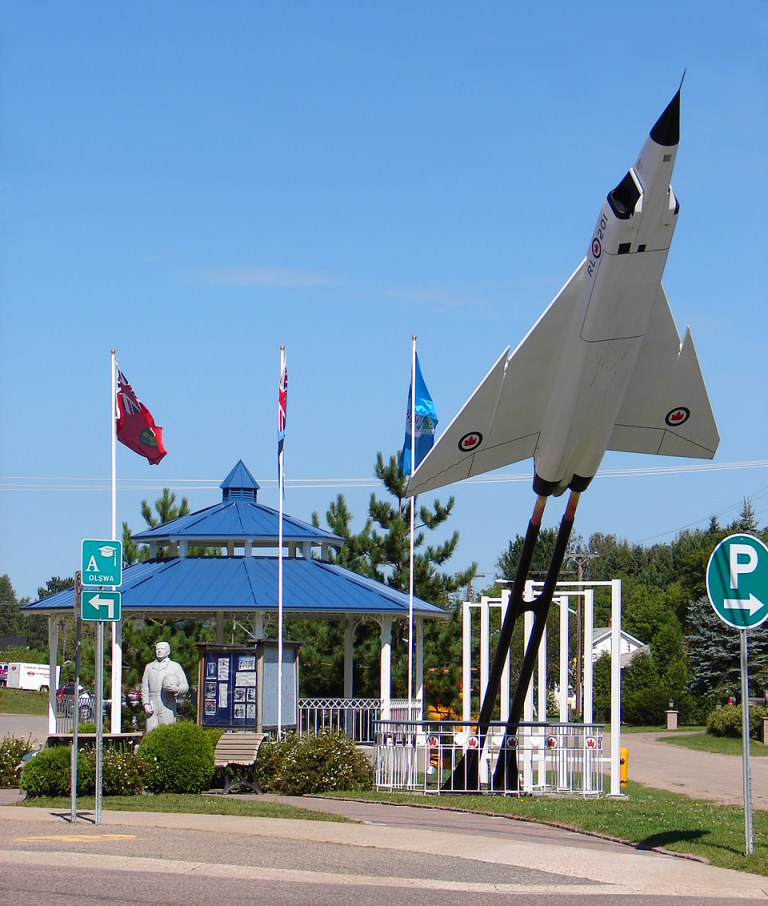
Żurakowski Park

The historic train station is home of the South of 60 Arts' Centre, host to a variety of arts and craft shows, musical events and festivals. In 2008, the town re-opened the Radcliffe Hills Ski Area for snowboarding and downhill skiing. Barry's Bay was the Central Canada finalist in the 2006 CBC Hockeyville competition.

The community dedicated a park and monument to honour the construction of the Canadian Avro CF-105 Arrow and its chief test pilot, local resident Janusz Żurakowski. The CF-105 was an advanced Canadian designed-and-built interceptor that was instrumental in the advancement of aviation technology in the late 1950s and early 1960s.

A causeway connects Barry's Bay to Mask Island, an island in Kamaniskeg Lake.

== Education ==
Barry's Bay is the site of Our Lady Seat of Wisdom College (OLSWC), an accredited Catholic liberal arts post-secondary institution established in 2000. As of the 2019–2020 school year, OLSWC had a student body of 110 full-time Canadian and international students.

== See also ==
- Madawaska Valley Airpark
- Madawaska Valley District High School
