= 2010 Renfrew County municipal elections =

Local election in Ontario, Canada

Elections were held in Renfrew County, Ontario on October 25, 2010 in conjunction with municipal elections across the province.

== Renfrew County Council ==
County council has no direct elections; its membership is made up of the mayors and reeves of the lower-tier municipalities of the county, including the reeves (not the mayors) or Arnprior, Renfrew and Whitewater Region. Therefore, elections in those municipalities determine the members of council for the new term.

| Position | Elected |
|---|---|
| Mayor of Admaston Bromley | Raye-Ann Briscoe |
| Reeve of Arnprior | Walter Stack |
| Mayor of Bonnechere Valley | Jennifer Murphy |
| Mayor of Brudenell, Lyndoch and Raglan | Norman Lentz |
| Mayor of Deep River | Dave Thompson |
| Reeve of Greater Madawaska | Peter Emon |
| Reeve of Head, Clara and Maria | Tammy Stewart |
| Mayor of Horton | Don Eady |
| Mayor of Killaloe, Hagarty and Richards | Janice Visneskie |
| Mayor of Laurentian Hills | Dick Rabishaw |
| Mayor of Laurentian Valley | Jack Wilson |
| Mayor of Madawaska Valley | David M. Shulist |
| Mayor of McNab/Braeside | Mary M. Campbell |
| Mayor of North Algona Wilberforce | Harold Weckworth |
| Mayor of Petawawa | Bob Sweet |
| Reeve of Renfrew | Audrey Green |
| Reeve of Whitewater Region | Donald Rathwell |

== Admaston Bromley ==
| Mayoral Candidate | Vote | % |
|---|---|---|
| Raye-Ann Briscoe (X) | 743 | |
| Jack Kelly | 447 | |

== Arnprior ==
| Mayoral Candidate | Vote | % |
|---|---|---|
| David Reid | 1,576 | |
| Jim Silye | 1,355 | |
| Nancy Black | 452 | |
| Doug Smith | 321 | |
| Ted Kelly | 107 | |

== Bonnechere Valley ==
| Mayoral Candidate | Vote | % |
|---|---|---|
| Jennifer Murphy | 1,313 | |
| Zig Mintha (X) | 1,205 | |
| Kip Smith | 94 | |

== Brudenell, Lyndoch and Raglan ==
| Mayoral Candidate | Vote | % |
|---|---|---|
| Norman Lentz (X) | Acclaimed | |

== Deep River ==
| Mayoral Candidate | Vote | % |
|---|---|---|
| Dave Thompson | 796 | |
| Glenn Doncaster | 770 | |
| Fred Adams | 191 | |

== Greater Madawaska ==
| Reeve Candidate | Vote | % |
|---|---|---|
| Peter Emon (X) | 1,446 | |
| John Pratt | 799 | |
| J. R. Easton | 380 | |

== Head, Clara and Maria ==
| Reeve Candidate | Vote | % |
|---|---|---|
| Tammy Stewart (X) | Acclaimed | |

== Horton ==
| Mayoral Candidate | Vote | % |
|---|---|---|
| Don Eady | 847 | |
| David Bennett | 447 | |
| Rod Ballantyne | 344 | |

== Killaloe, Hagarty and Richards ==
| Mayoral Candidate | Vote | % |
|---|---|---|
| Janice Visneskie (X) | Acclaimed | |

== Laurentian Hills ==
| Mayoral Candidate | Vote | % |
|---|---|---|
| Dick Rabishaw | Acclaimed | |

== Laurentian Valley ==
| Mayoral Candidate | Vote | % |
|---|---|---|
| Jack Wilson (X) | 2,847 | |
| Aurel Boucher | 667 | |

== Madawaska Valley ==
| Mayoral Candidate | Vote | % |
|---|---|---|
| David M. Shulist | 1,467 | 42.42 |
| Bob Kulas | 1,227 | 35.48 |
| Percy A. Bresnaham | 764 | 22.09 |

== McNab/Braeside ==
| Mayoral Candidate | Vote | % |
|---|---|---|
| Mary M. Campbell (X) | Acclaimed | |

== North Algona-Wilberforce ==
| Mayoral Candidate | Vote | % |
|---|---|---|
| Harold Weckworth (X) | Acclaimed | |

== Petawawa ==
In Petawawa, voters elected six at-large councillors by casting their paper ballots in 19 polls at the Petawawa Civic Centre.

| Mayoral Candidate | Vote | % |
|---|---|---|
| Bob Sweet (X) | Acclaimed | |

| Council Candidate | Vote | % |
|---|---|---|
| Tom Mohns (X) | 1,502 | |
| Treena Lemay (X) | 1,316 | |
| Theresa Sabourin (X) | 1,185 | |
| Murray Rutz | 1,181 | |
| James Carmody | 1,109 | |
| Frank Cirella | 1, 043 | |
| Joe Park (X) | 996 | |
| Ann McIntyre | 882 | |
| Art Ploughman | 443 | |

== Renfrew ==
| Mayoral Candidate | Vote | % |
|---|---|---|
| Bill Ringrose | 1,477 | |
| Sandi Heins (X) | 1,150 | |
| Callum W. R. Scott | 615 | |

== Whitewater Region ==
| Mayoral Candidate | Vote | % |
|---|---|---|
| Jim Labow | Acclaimed | |
