= Renfrew County =

County in Ontario, Canada

- County (upper-tier)
- County of Renfrew
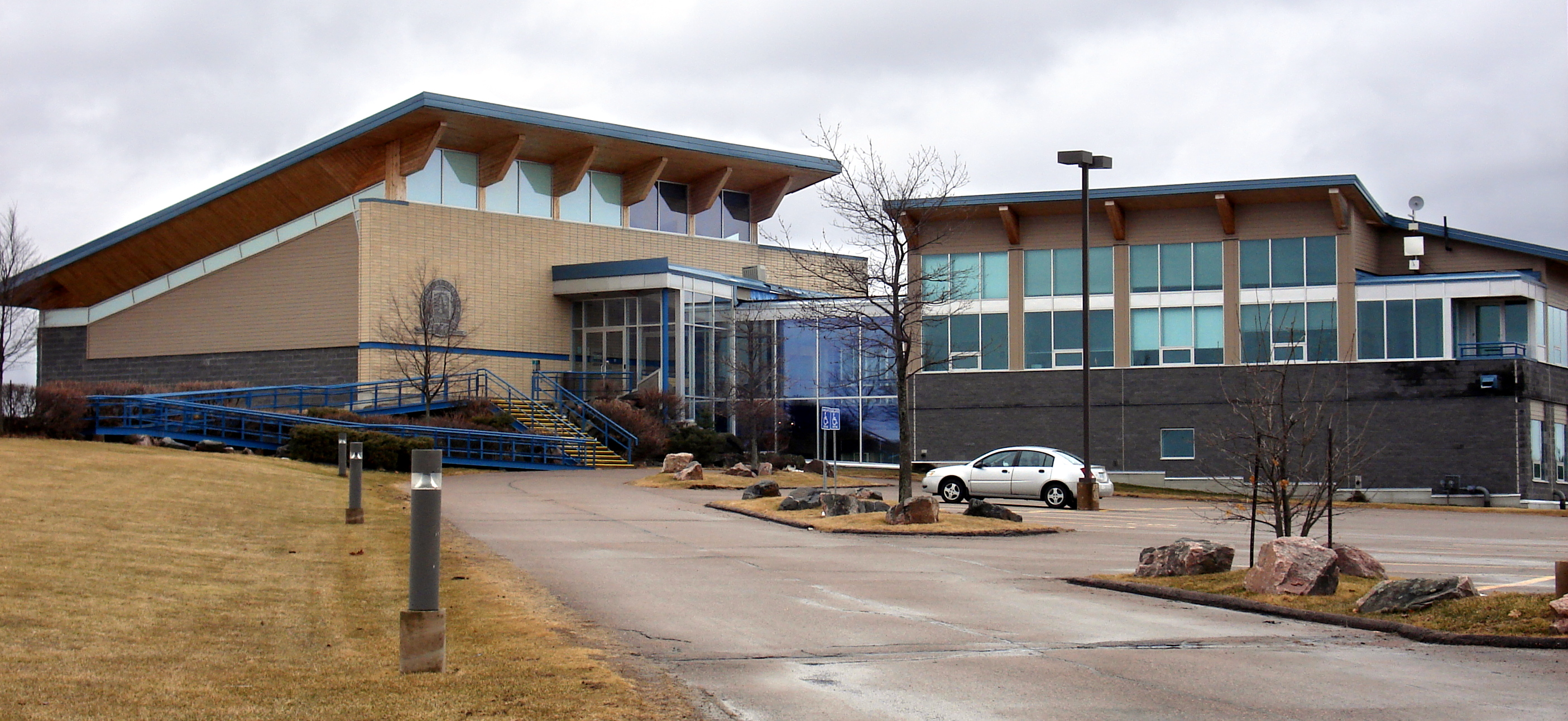
- The administration building of the county government

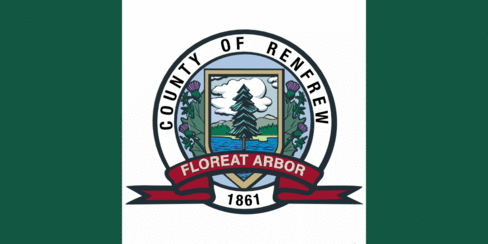
- Flag
- Motto: Floreat Arbor (Let the tree blossom)
- Location of Renfrew County
- Coordinates: 45°40′N 77°15′W
- Country: Canada
- Province: Ontario
- Established: 1861
- County seat: Pembroke (independent)
- Municipalities: List: City of Arnprior; Town of Deep River; Town of Laurentian Hills; Town of Petawawa; Town of Renfrew; Township of Admaston/Bromley; Municipality of Bonnechere Valley; Township of Brudenell, Lyndoch and Raglan; Township of Greater Madawaska; Township of Head, Clara and Maria; Township of Horton; Township of Killaloe, Hagarty and Richards; Township of Laurentian Valley; Township of Madawaska Valley; Township of McNab/Braeside; Township of North Algona Wilberforce; Township of Whitewater Region

Area
  - Land: 7,343.62 km^{2} (2,835.39 sq mi)
  - Census div.: 7,357.94 km^{2} (2,840.92 sq mi)
- Land area excludes Pembroke

Population (2021)
  - Total: 92,001
  - Density: 12.5/km^{2} (32/sq mi)
  - Census div.: 106,365
  - Census div. density: 14.5/km^{2} (38/sq mi)
- Total excludes Pembroke
- Time zone: UTC-5 (EST)
  - Summer (DST): UTC-4 (EDT)
- Area codes: 613 and 343
- Website: www.countyofrenfrew.on.ca

Renfrew County is a county and census division in the Canadian province of Ontario. It is located on the west bank of the Ottawa River. There are 17 municipalities in the county. Its county seat is Pembroke, which is geographically within the county but administered independently.

== History ==
=== Bathurst District ===
When Carleton County was withdrawn from Bathurst District in 1838, Renfrew County was severed from part of the remaining Lanark County, but the two remained united for electoral purposes. By 1845, all lands in the District had been surveyed into the following townships:

Counties comprising Bathurst District (1845)
| Lanark | Renfrew |
|---|---|
| Bathurst; Beckwith; Drummond; Dalhousie; Darling; North Elmsley; North Burgess; Levant; Lanark; Montague; Ramsay; North Sherbrooke; South Sherbrooke | Admaston; Blithefield; Bagot; Bromley; Horton; McNab; Pakenham; Pembroke; Ross; Stafford; Westmeath |

=== United Counties of Lanark and Renfrew ===
Effective January 1, 1850, Bathurst District was abolished, and the "United Counties of Lanark and Renfrew" replaced it for municipal and judicial purposes. The counties remained united for electoral purposes in the Parliament of the Province of Canada, referred to as the County of Lanark, until Renfrew gained its own seat in 1853.

The separation of Renfrew from Lanark began in 1861, with the creation of a Provisional Municipal Council that held its first meeting in June 1861. The United Counties were dissolved in August 1866.

=== Geographical evolution ===
The territory was originally described in 1838 as consisting of:

...the Townships of Packenham, McNab, Horton, Ross, Westmeath and Pembroke, together with the unsurveyed lands within the District of Bathurst, and all the islands in the Ottawa River, wholly or in greater part opposite to the said Townships and unsurveyed lands...

In 1851, Pakenham was transferred to Lanark, while Renfrew was expanded through the addition of:

...all that tract of land lying between the Western Boundaries of the Townships of Lavant, Blithfield, Admaston, Bromley, Stafford and Pembroke and the Ottawa River, and a line drawn parallel to the general course of the said Boundaries of the said Townships from the western corner of the Township of Clarendon to the Ottawa River.

In 1860, the newly surveyed townships of Miller and Canonto were transferred to Frontenac County, while the townships of Raglan, Lyndoch, Radcliffe and Brudenell were added to Renfrew. The final expansion of the County occurred in 1877-1878, with the transfer of the United Townships of Hagarty, Sherwood, Jones, Richards and Burns, and the United Townships of Head, Clara and Maria, from Nipissing District.

Once all lands had been surveyed in 1878, the County consisted of the following geographic townships:

- Admaston
- Alice
- Bagot
- Blythfield
- Bromley
- Brougham
- Brudenell
- Buchanan
- Burns
- Clara
- Fraser
- Grattan
- Griffith
- Hagarty
- Head
- Horton
- Jones
- Lyndoch
- Maria
- Matawatchan
- McKay
- McNab
- North Algona
- Pembroke
- Petawawa
- Radcliffe
- Raglan
- Richards
- Rolph
- Ross
- Sebastopol
- Sherwood
- South Algona
- Stafford
- Westmeath
- Wilberforce
- Wylie

=== Municipal reorganization (2001) ===
Map showing the city of Pembroke, with the five towns and twelve townships of Renfrew County, Ontario.
1 City of Arnprior
2 Town of Deep River
3 Town of Laurentian Hills
4 Town of Petawawa
5 Town of Renfrew
6 Township of Admaston/Bromley
7 Township of Bonnechere Valley
8 Township of Brudenell, Lyndoch and Raglan
9 Township of Greater Madawaska
10 Township of Head, Clara and Maria
11 Township of Horton
12 Township of Killaloe, Hagarty and Richards
13 Township of Laurentian Valley
14 Township of Madawaska Valley
15 Township of McNab/Braeside
16 Township of North Algona Wilberforce
17 Township of Whitewater Region

| Current municipality | consisting of the townships of |
|---|---|
Town of Arnprior
Town of Deep River
| Town of Laurentian Hills | Buchanan; McKay; Rolph; Wylie |
| Town of Petawawa | Petawawa |
Town of Renfrew
| Township of Admaston/Bromley | Admaston; Bromley |
| Township of Bonnechere Valley | Grattan; Sebastopol; South Alcona |
| Township of Brudenell, Lyndoch and Raglan | Brudenell; Lyndoch; Raglan |
| Township of Greater Madawaska | Bagot; Blythfield; Brougham; Griffith; Matawatchan |
| Township of Head, Clara and Maria | Clara; Head; Maria |
| Township of Horton | Horton |
| Township of Killaloe, Hagarty and Richards | Hagarty; Richards |
| Township of Laurentian Valley | Alice; Fraser; Pembroke; Stafford |
| Township of Madawaska Valley | Burns; Jones; Radcliffe; Sherwood |
| Township of McNab/Braeside | McNab |
| Township of North Algona Wilberforce | North Algona; Wilberforce |
| Township of Whitewater Region | Ross; Westmeath |

The county seat, Pembroke, is a separated municipality.

== Geography ==
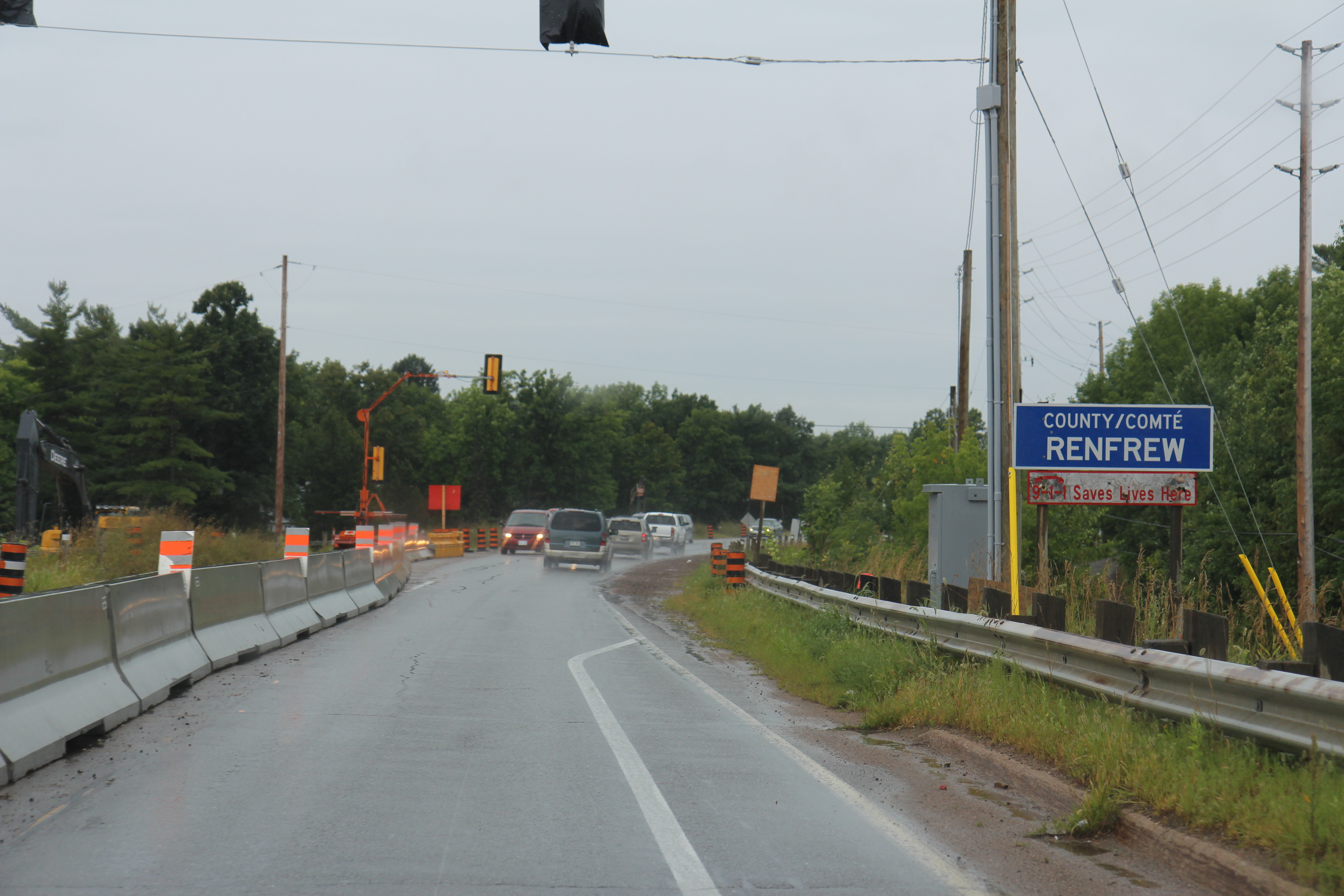
Entering Renfrew County from Quebec on QC148

Renfrew County is known for its lakeside cottages and white-water rafting along the Ottawa River, and has more than 900 lakes. It is located in the primary region of Southern Ontario and the secondary region Eastern or Southeastern Ontario. Renfrew County is also the largest county in terms of area in Ontario, ahead of Hastings County.

== Demographics ==
As a census division in the 2021 Census of Population conducted by Statistics Canada, Renfrew County had a population of 106,365 living in 44,952 of its 51,134 total private dwellings, a change of 3.9% from its 2016 population of 102,394. With a land area of 7,357.94 km^{2} (2,840.92 sq mi), it had a population density of 14.5/km^{2} (37.4/sq mi) in 2021.

Canada census – Renfrew County (census division) community profile

| | 2021 | 2016 | 2011 |
| Population | 106,365 (+3.9% from 2016) | 102,394 (+1.1% from 2011) | 101,326 (3.9% from 2006) |
| Land area | 7,357.94 km^{2} (2,840.92 sq mi) | 7,448.57 km^{2} (2,875.91 sq mi) | 7,440.81 km^{2} (2,872.91 sq mi) |
| Population density | 14.5/km^{2} (38/sq mi) | 13.7/km^{2} (35/sq mi) | 13.6/km^{2} (35/sq mi) |
| Median age | 45.2 (M: 43.2, F: 47.2) | 44.8 (M: 43.0, F: 46.5) |
| Private dwellings | 51,134 (total) 44,952 (occupied) | 49,860 (total) 42,779 (occupied) | 48,229 (total) |
| Median household income | $80,000 | $67,683 |

Notes: Includes City of Pembroke.
References: 2021 2016 2011

Historical census populations – Renfrew County

| Year | Pop. | ±% |
|---|---|---|
| 1921 | 51,505 | — |
| 1931 | 52,227 | +1.4% |
| 1941 | 54,720 | +4.8% |
| 1951 | 66,717 | +21.9% |
| 1956 | 78,245 | +17.3% |
| 1961 | 89,635 | +14.6% |

| Year | Pop. | ±% |
|---|---|---|
| 1966 | 89,453 | −0.2% |
| 1971 | 90,875 | +1.6% |
| 1976 | 89,099 | −2.0% |
| 1981 | 87,484 | −1.8% |
| 1986 | 88,965 | +1.7% |
| 1991 | 91,685 | +3.1% |

| Year | Pop. | ±% |
|---|---|---|
| 1996 | 96,224 | +5.0% |
| 2001 | 95,138 | −1.1% |
| 2006 | 97,545 | +2.5% |
| 2011 | 101,326 | +3.9% |
| 2016 | 102,394 | +1.1% |
| 2021 | 106,365 | +3.9% |

Source: Statistics Canada

== Arts and culture ==
At Wilno, Ontario Canada's Kashubian community celebrates their heritage.

== Military ==
The county is home to CFB Petawawa and gives its name to The Lanark and Renfrew Scottish Regiment.

== Notable people ==
- Ray Larabie, typographer
- Silver Quilty, Canada's Sports Hall of Fame inductee

== See also ==
- List of numbered roads in Renfrew County
- List of municipalities in Ontario
- List of Ontario counties
- Renfrew County municipal elections, 2010
- List of townships in Ontario
- List of secondary schools in Ontario#Renfrew County
