= Laurentian Hills =

- Town (lower-tier)
- Town of Laurentian Hills
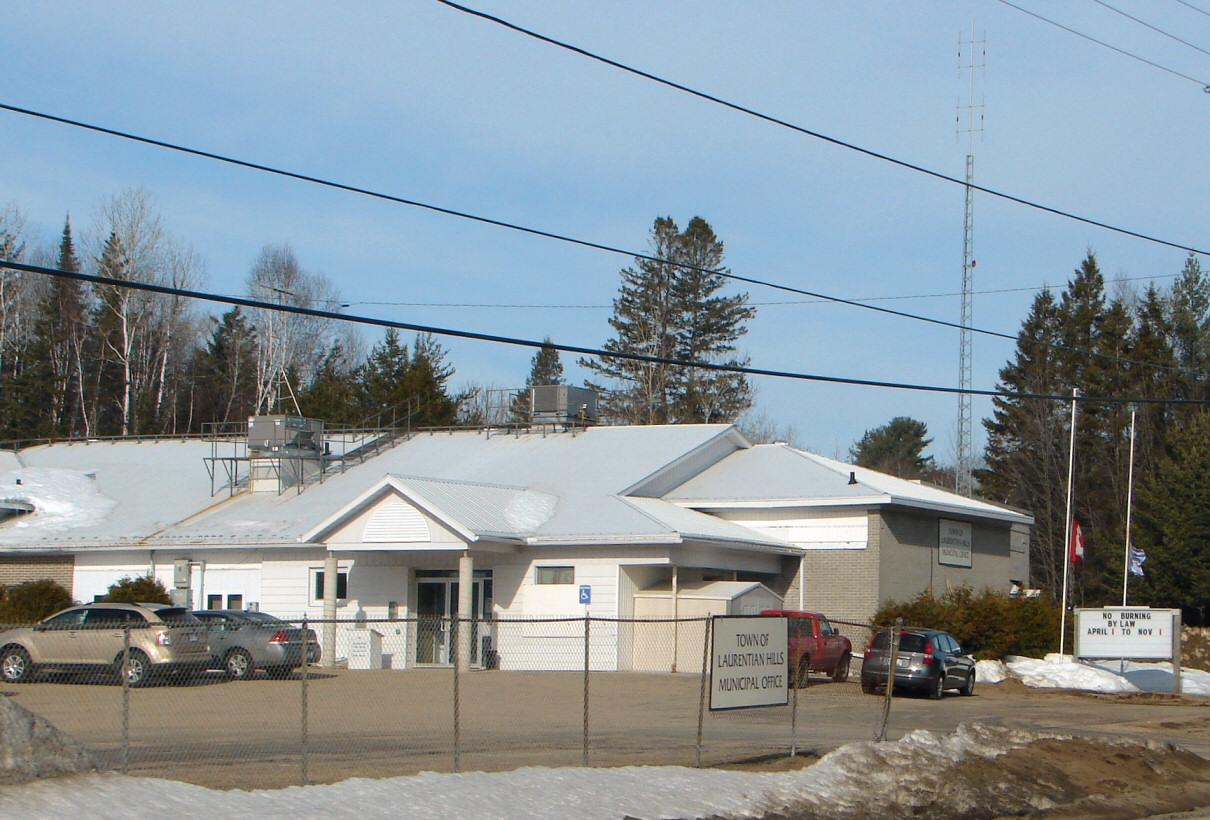
- Municipal offices in Point Alexander

- Location within Renfrew County Location within Southern Ontario
- Coordinates: 46°08′N 77°33′W
- Country: Canada
- Province: Ontario
- County: Renfrew
- Established: January 1, 2000

Government
  - Mayor: Anne Giardini
  - Federal riding: Algonquin—Renfrew—Pembroke
  - Prov. riding: Renfrew—Nipissing—Pembroke

Area
  - Land: 634.31 km^{2} (244.91 sq mi)

Population (2021)
  - Total: 2,885
  - Density: 4.5/km^{2} (12/sq mi)
- Time zone: UTC-5 (EST)
  - Summer (DST): UTC-4 (EDT)
- Postal Code: K0J 1J0
- Area code: 613
- Website: www.laurentianhills.ca

Laurentian Hills is a municipality in Eastern Ontario, Canada, on the Ottawa River in Renfrew County. It surrounds (by land) Deep River on the Ontario side of the river. The municipality was formed on January 1, 2000, when the United Townships of Rolph, Buchanan, Wylie and McKay and the Village of Chalk River were merged.

The town was home to the Nuclear Power Demonstration nuclear power plant. The prototype nuclear power plant was operational from 1962 to 1987 and has since then been shut down, awaiting permanent disposal of its radioactive nuclear components.

== Communities ==
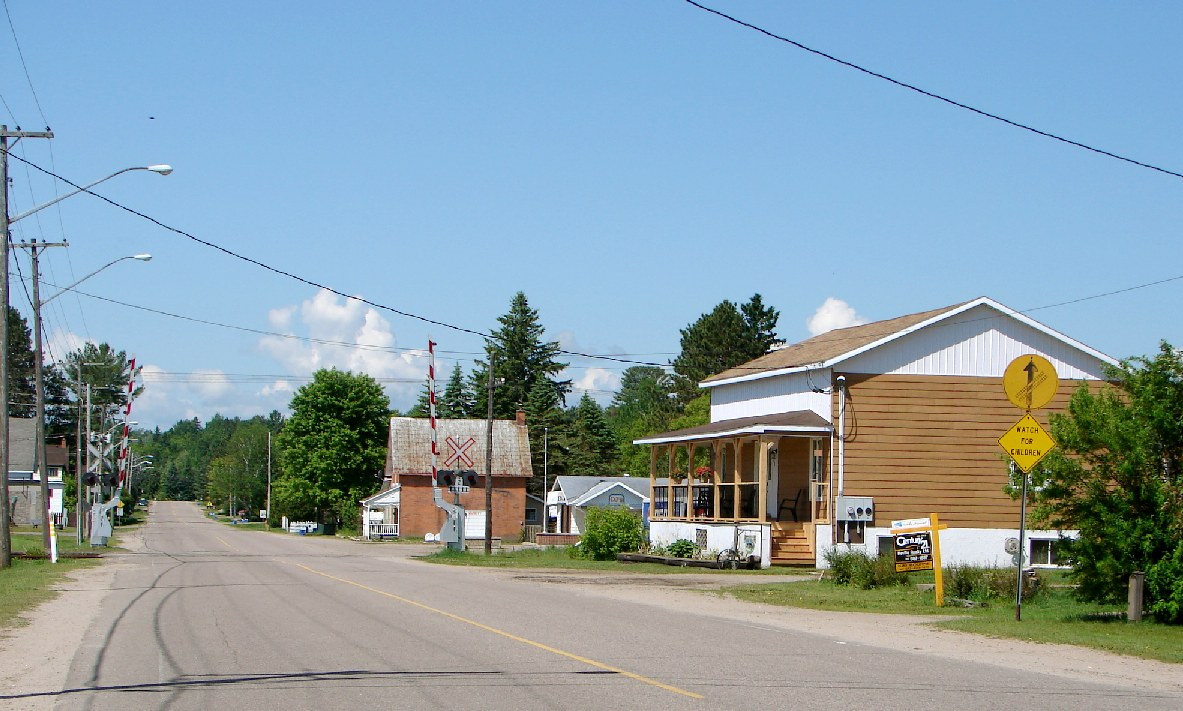
Main Street in Chalk River.

The town comprises the communities of Chalk River, Meilleurs Bay, Moor Lake, Point Alexander, Rolphton, and Wylie.

== Demographics ==
In the 2021 Census of Population conducted by Statistics Canada, Laurentian Hills had a population of 2,885 living in 1,251 of its 1,393 total private dwellings, a change of −2.6% from its 2016 population of 2,961. With a land area of 634.31 km^{2} (244.91 sq mi), it had a population density of 4.5/km^{2} (11.8/sq mi) in 2021.

Historical census populations – Laurentian Hills
Year	Pop.	±%
2001	2,750	—
2006	2,789	+1.4%
2011	2,811	+0.8%
2016	2,961	+5.3%
2021	2,885	−2.6%
Source: Statistics Canada

Historical census populations – Chalk River Village
Year	Pop.	±%
1956	986	—
1961	1,135	+15.1%
1966	1,086	−4.3%
1971	1,094	+0.7%
1976	1,095	+0.1%
1981	1,010	−7.8%
1986	923	−8.6%
1991	874	−5.3%
1996	974	+11.4%
Source: Statistics Canada

Historical census populations – Rolph, Buchanan, Wylie and McKay TP
Year	Pop.	±%
1956	1,780	—
1961	2,079	+16.8%
1966	2,040	−1.9%
1971	2,066	+1.3%
1976	1,836	−11.1%
1981	1,743	−5.1%
1986	1,790	+2.7%
1991	1,656	−7.5%
1996	1,810	+9.3%
Source: Statistics Canada

== Local government ==
List of former mayors:

- Paul Curtis (2000)
- Vance Gutzman (2003)
- Richard Rabishaw (2010–2014)
- John Reinwald (2014–2022)
- Anne Giardini (2022–present)

== Trivia ==
An Ontario Historical Plaque in front of the School House Museum was erected by the province to commemorate the role of steamboating on the Upper Ottawa in Ontario's heritage.

== See also ==
- List of francophone communities in Ontario
- List of townships in Ontario
