= Madawaska Valley =

- Township (lower-tier)
- Township of Madawaska Valley
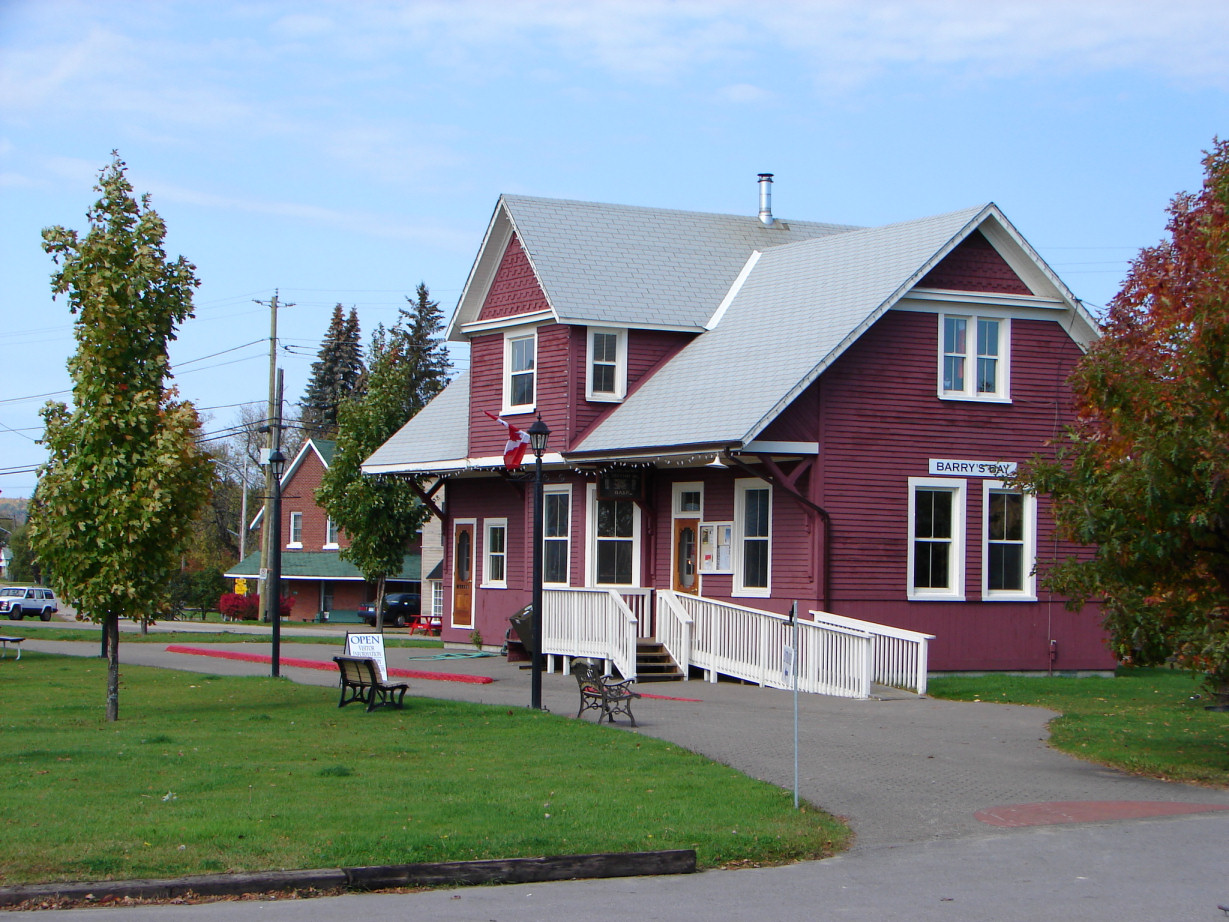
- Tourist office in Barry's Bay

- Location within Renfrew County Location within Southern Ontario
- Coordinates: 45°30′N 77°40′W
- Country: Canada
- Province: Ontario
- County: Renfrew
- Formed: January 1, 2001

Government
  - Mayor: Mark Willmer
  - Federal riding: Algonquin—Renfrew—Pembroke
  - Prov. riding: Renfrew—Nipissing—Pembroke

Area
  - Land: 665.83 km^{2} (257.08 sq mi)

Population (2021)
  - Total: 3,927
  - Density: 5.9/km^{2} (15/sq mi)
- Time zone: UTC-5 (EST)
  - Summer (DST): UTC-4 (EDT)
- Postal Code: K0J
- Area codes: 613, 343
- Website: https://www.madawaskavalley.ca

The Township of Madawaska Valley is a township municipality in Renfrew County, Ontario, Canada. It was formed in 2001 through the amalgamation of the village of Barry's Bay and the townships of Radcliffe and Sherwood Jones & Burns.

The area is also a culturally significant location for the Polish diaspora in Canada, and is known by members of the community as Kaszuby (English Kashubia), after a region in Northern Poland that many early settlers of the region hailed from.

Its largest population centre is Barry's Bay, and it also includes the settlements of Combermere and Wilno, the latter of which being named for the city of Vilnius (Polish Wilno), a city in modern Lithuania that has historically possessed a large Polish population and significant cultural ties to Poland.

The area is also the locus of Polish scouting organizations within Canada (including both ZHP and ZHR), who hold overnight camps for scouts annually, in July.

== Demographics ==
In the 2021 Census of Population conducted by Statistics Canada, Madawaska Valley had a population of 3,927 living in 1,713 of its 2,541 total private dwellings, a change of −4.8% from its 2016 population of 4,123. With a land area of 665.83 km^{2} (257.08 sq mi), it had a population density of 5.9/km^{2} (15.3/sq mi) in 2021.

Canada census – Madawaska Valley community profile

| | 2021 | 2016 | 2011 |
| Population | 3,927 (-4.8% from 2016) | 4,123 (-3.7% from 2011) | 4,282 (-2.3% from 2006) |
| Land area | 665.83 km^{2} (257.08 sq mi) | 672.51 km^{2} (259.66 sq mi) | 671.85 km^{2} (259.40 sq mi) |
| Population density | 5.9/km^{2} (15/sq mi) | 6.1/km^{2} (16/sq mi) | 6.4/km^{2} (17/sq mi) |
| Median age | 58.4 (M: 57.6, F: 59.2) | 55.5 (M: 54.4, F: 56.4) | 51.3 (M: 49.9, F: 52.3) |
| Private dwellings | 2,541 (total) 1,713 (occupied) | 2,619 (total) 1,706 (occupied) | 2,748 (total) |
| Median household income | $62,800 | $52,679 |

References: 2021 2016 2011

Historical census populations – Madawaska Valley
| Year | Pop. | ±% |
|---|---|---|
| 2001 | 4,406 | — |
| 2006 | 4,381 | −0.6% |
| 2011 | 4,282 | −2.3% |
| 2016 | 4,123 | −3.7% |
| 2021 | 3,927 | −4.8% |
Source: Statistics Canada

- Population total in 1996:
  - Barry's Bay: 1,086
  - Radcliffe township: 1,116
  - Sherwood, Jones and Burns township: 2,140
- Population in 1991:
  - Barry's Bay: 1,088
  - Radcliffe township: 1,077
  - Sherwood, Jones and Burns township: 2,101

Mother tongue (2021):

- English as first language: 84.2%
- French as first language: 2.2%
- English and French as first language: 0.5%
- Other as first language: 11.4%

== Local government ==
List of former mayors:

- William "Bill" Schweig (2001–2003)
- John Hildebrandt
- David Shulist
- Kim Love (2014–2022)
- Mark Wilmer (2022–2025)
