= Jack Gray (Canadian football) =

Canadian football player

John 'Jack' Gray
Profile
- Positions: End, Halfback

Personal information
- Born: May 16, 1927
- Died: March 30, 2018 (aged 91); Pembroke, Ontario, Canada
- Listed height: 5 ft 10 in (1.78 m)
- Listed weight: 170 lb (77 kg)

Career history
- 1951–1953: Toronto Argonauts

Awards and highlights
- Grey Cup champion (1952)

John "Jack" Gray (May 16, 1927 – March 30, 2018) was a Canadian professional football player who played for the Toronto Argonauts. He won the Grey Cup with them in 1952. He also attended and played football at the University of Toronto. After his football career, Jack moved to Deep River, Ontario where he had a long career as a teacher at Mackenzie High School and Superintendent of the Renfrew County School Board. Jack was also the first principal of the Deep River Science Academy. He died in March 2018 at the age of 91.
