= D'Alton Corry Coleman =

Canadian railway executive and businessman (1879–1956)

D'Alton Corry Coleman CMG KStJ
- Born: July 9, 1879; Carleton Place, Ontario, Canada
- Died: October 17, 1956 (aged 77); Montreal, Quebec, Canada
- Occupations: Railway executive and businessman
- Employer: Canadian Pacific Railway
- Children: 2, including Jim Coleman
- Honours: LL.D. (Hon), DCL (Hon), Knight of Grace in The Most Venerable Order of the Hospital of St. John of Jerusalem

D'Alton Corry Coleman CMG KStJ (July 9, 1879 – October 17, 1956) was a Canadian railway executive and businessman. He began working for the Canadian Pacific Railway (CPR) in 1899, and was promoted through its ranks until serving as president from 1942 to 1947. He oversaw expansion which added 3,620 kilometres (2,250 mi) of branch lines in the Canadian Prairies, and guided Western Canada railways through the Great Depression. He developed the CPR to support logistics during World War II, including manufacture of munitions, expanded shipbuilding and established one of the country's first private blood donation clinics. Canadian Pacific Air Lines was established under his leadership, and he became chairman of the Canadian Pacific Steamship Company, Canadian Pacific Hotels and other subsidiaries. He maintained good relations between the CPR and its unionized workers and believed in promoting from within the company.

Coleman developed a love for reading history at a young age, became city editor of The Belleville Intelligencer by age 18, and kept a large personal library on Canadiana. He was the father of sports journalist Jim Coleman, served as the vice-president of the Montreal Canadiens, and owned a horse racing stable which produced the winner of the 1943 Canadian Derby. Coleman had a long association of community service with the Navy League of Canada, and served in executive positions on multiple financial institutions including the Bank of Montreal and the Metropolitan Life Insurance Company. He served on the board of governors for the University of Manitoba, McGill University and the University of Bishop's College; and received honorary law degrees from Manitoba and Bishop's. He was made a Knight of Grace in The Most Venerable Order of the Hospital of St. John of Jerusalem in 1943, and appointed a Companion of the Order of St Michael and St George in 1946.

== Early life and education ==
D'Alton Corry Coleman was born on July 9, 1879, in Carleton Place, Ontario. He was the oldest son in a family including six boys and one girl, to parents James Coleman and Mary Jane Doherty, who were first generation Irish Canadians. At age four, his family relocated to Braeside, where he attended elementary school. As a youth, he enjoyed reading history books, Blackwood's Magazine, and had a subscription to The Times of London by age 13.

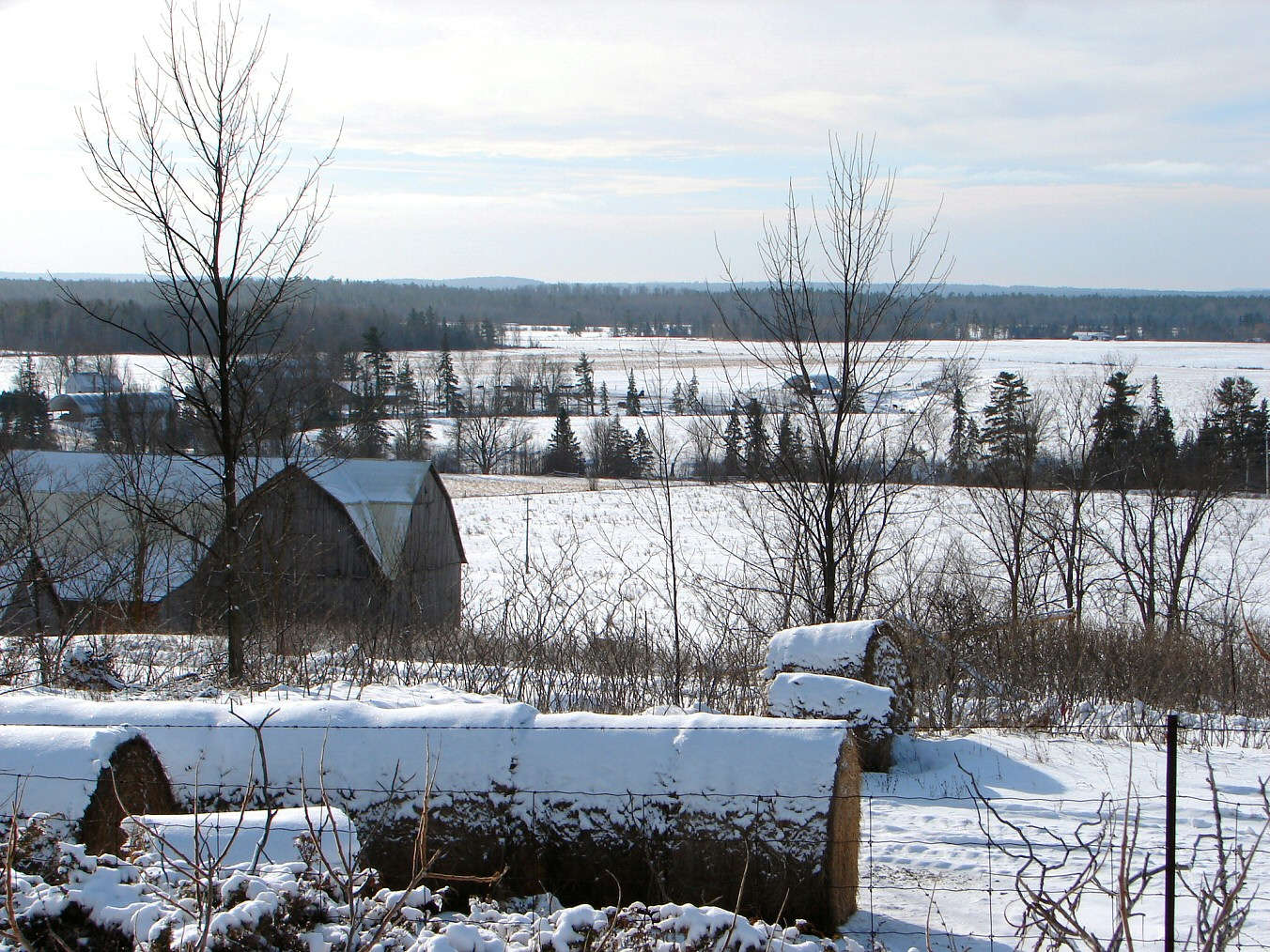
Rural Braeside in winter

Coleman attended Arnprior District High School by walking five miles each day, and played football and baseball at school. During summers he worked 11 hours per day at a local lumber yard, earning C$12 per month as a tallyman checking freight on flatcars. He left school at age 15 to work full-time at the lumber yard with a raise to $30 per month.

Coleman saved his money from work then attended Belleville Business College to learn shorthand. After completing business college, he worked one year as a secretary for George Albertus Cox and Edward Rogers Wood at Central Canada Loan and Savings Company in Toronto.

Coleman turned to journalism and became a reporter for The Belleville Intelligencer. Six months later, he was promoted to be city editor at age 18. He later worked for the Port Huron Times as an editor.

Coleman quit the newspaper business after two years and was accepted for an advertised position in Buffalo, New York. He spent his life savings on a rail ticket to get there, and turned down the job when he found out it was for selling pills. After a night of roaming the streets Buffalo to keep warm, he visited a restaurant where the female owner listened to his story, fed him a large breakfast and gave him money for a rail ticket to get to his relatives in Sarnia.

== Canadian Pacific Railway career ==
=== Early years in Western Canada ===
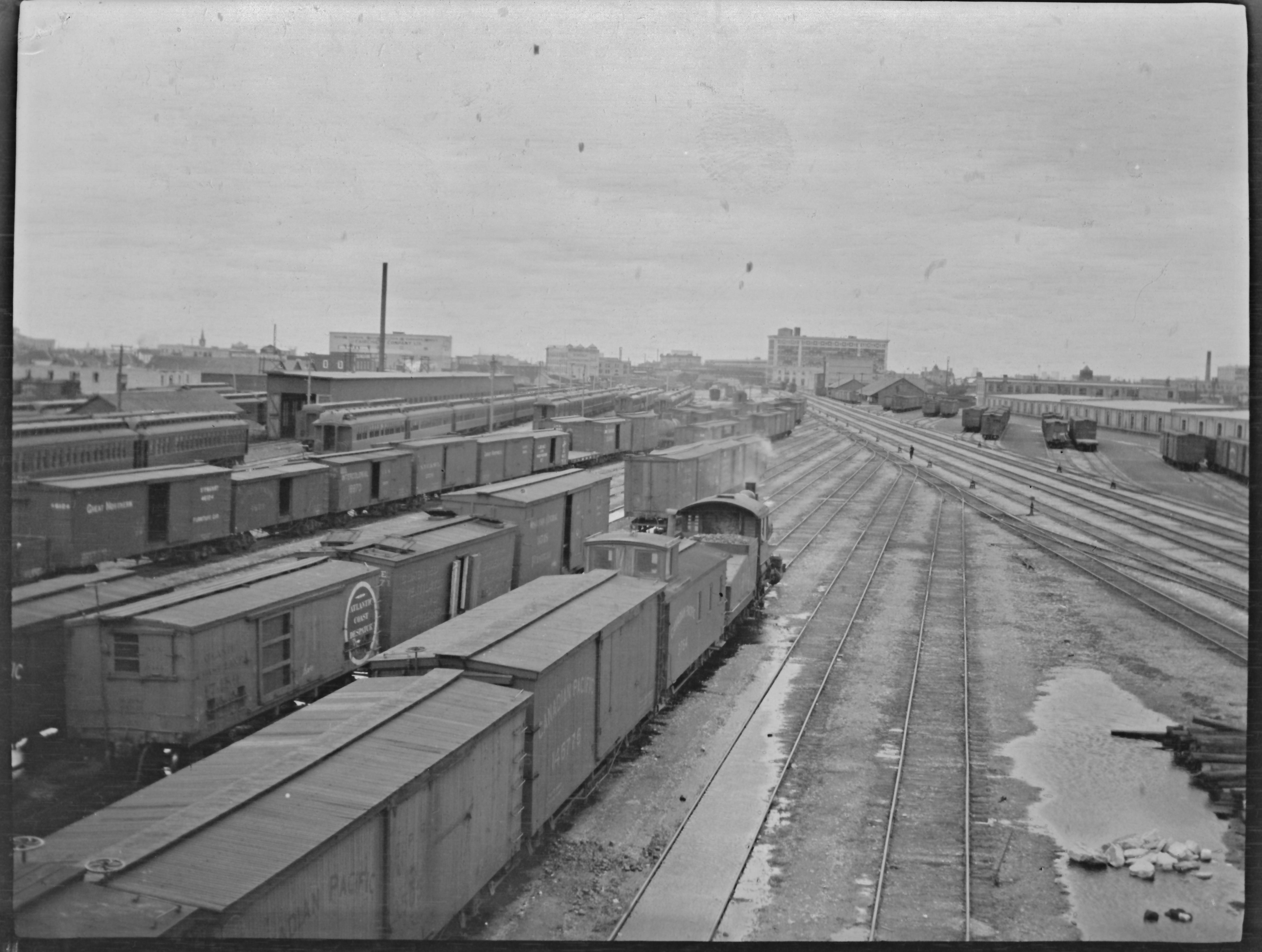
Canadian Pacific Railway yard in Winnipeg c. 1907

Coleman began working for the Canadian Pacific Railway (CPR) on November 4, 1899, as an assistant engineer's clerk in Fort William. From 1899 to 1907, he moved around as a clerk and accountant based in Winnipeg, then Cranbrook and North Bay. He became the superintendent of the Kootenay Division based in Nelson in 1907, then superintendent of railcar service in Vancouver then Winnipeg in 1908. He was promoted to general superintendent in Winnipeg in 1912, then held the same position in Calgary in 1913, and return to Winnipeg in 1915 as the assistant general manager.

In October 1918, Coleman was appointed the vice-president of Western Lines. Then CPR president Lord Shaughnessy predicted that Coleman would one day become president of the company. Coleman was in charge of all CPR trackage from the Great Lakes to the Pacific Ocean and oversaw expansion which added 3,620 kilometres (2,250 mi) of branch lines in the Canadian Prairies. He guided the Western Lines through the Great Depression making adjustments to services due to declining revenues.

=== CPR executive in Montreal ===
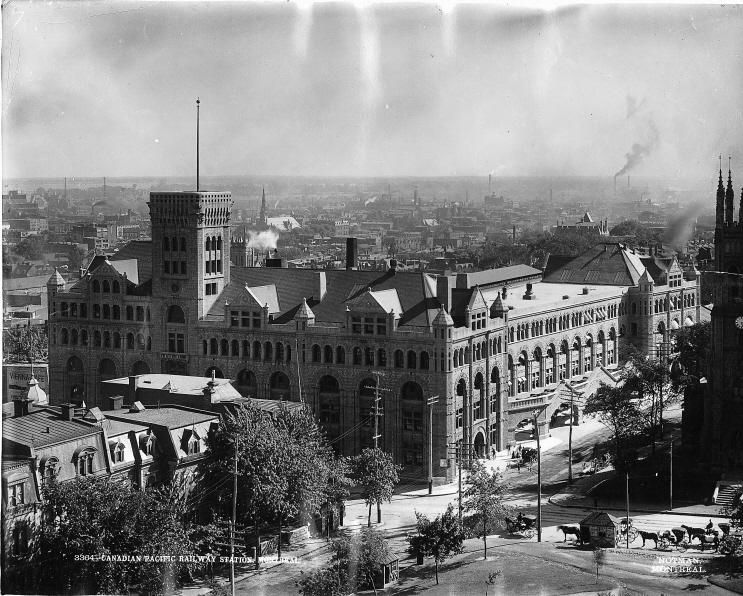
Windsor Station in Montreal, headquarters of the CPR

Coleman became vice-president of the CPR in October 1934 and relocated to Montreal. He gradually assumed more responsibilities as the health of president Edward Wentworth Beatty worsened. As the senior vice-president during the beginning of World War II, he oversaw expansion of CPR operations and upgrade of equipment to meet increased demand by war time logistics.

Coleman also served as chairman of the Consolidated Mining and Smelting Company of Canada, and as a director of the West Kootenay Power and Light, both as part of the CPR supply chain. He was involved in the management of multiple railroad partners, including as director of Northern Alberta Railways, Minneapolis, St. Paul and Sault Ste. Marie Railroad and Toronto Terminals Railway; and served as vice-president of the Toronto, Hamilton and Buffalo Railway and the Calgary and Edmonton Railway. He was president of the ground transport division of CPR, known as the Canadian Pacific Express Company, and was chairman and director of Associated Screen News of Canada which was operated by the CPR.

In May 1942, Coleman became the fifth president of CPR when he was appointed at age 63. A year later he was named chairman of the board of governors on May 5, 1943. He was the first CPR president who was not listed in Burke's Peerage, and was described by Maclean's as "the Great Commoner".

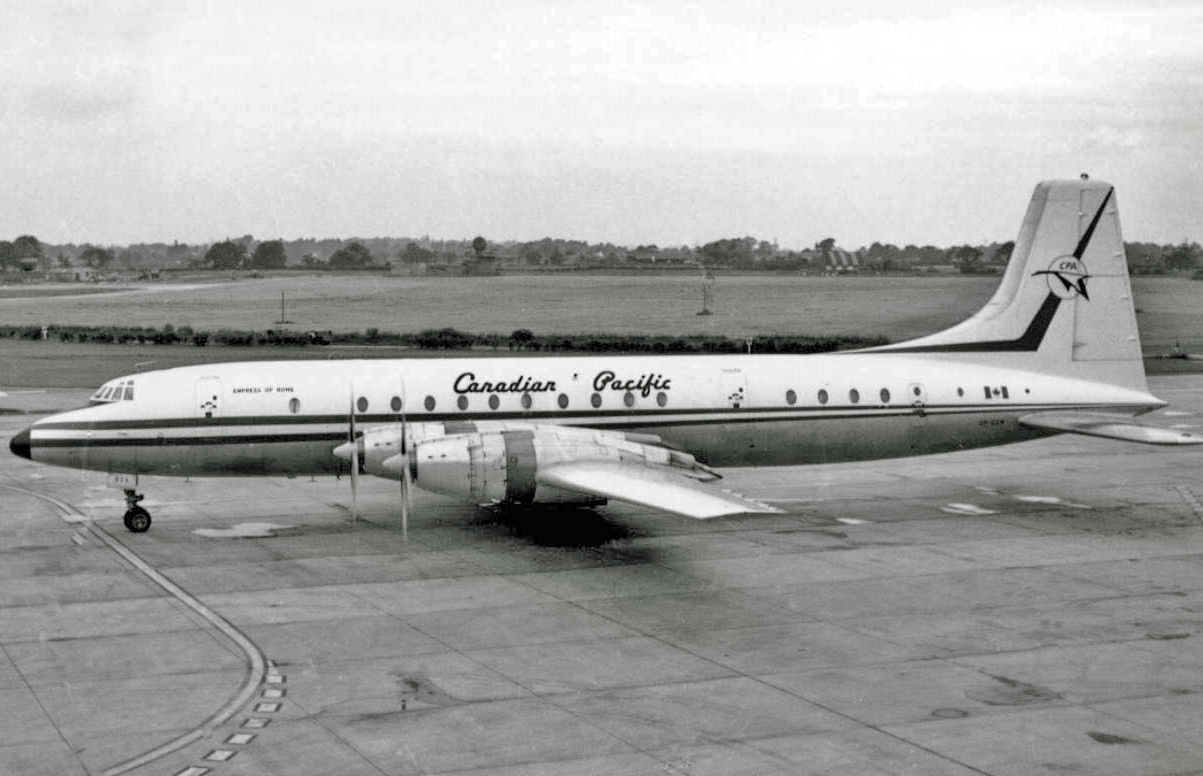
Canadian Pacific Air Lines plane c. 1965

Coleman also became chairman of the Canadian Pacific Steamship Company, and president of the Canadian Australasian Line which was formerly the Canadian-Australian Royal Mail Steam Ship Company. He oversaw the establishment of Canadian Pacific Air Lines in 1942, and became its chairman after the CPR absorbed Canadian Airways and nine other companies.

During World War II, Coleman oversaw manufacturing of munitions at the CPR Angus Shops in Montreal and CPR Ogden Shops in Calgary, and expanded shipbuilding to assist the Allies of World War II and replacement of steamships lost to enemy attacks. He also used the Angus Shops to establish one of the country's first private blood donation clinics in co-operation with the Canadian Red Cross. The CPR replaced 12 of its ships that were sunk, flew its planes on the Atlantic Bridge, moved 307,000,000 metric tons (302,000,000 long tons; 338,000,000 short tons) of freight, and produced Valentine tanks at its Angus Shops until 1943.

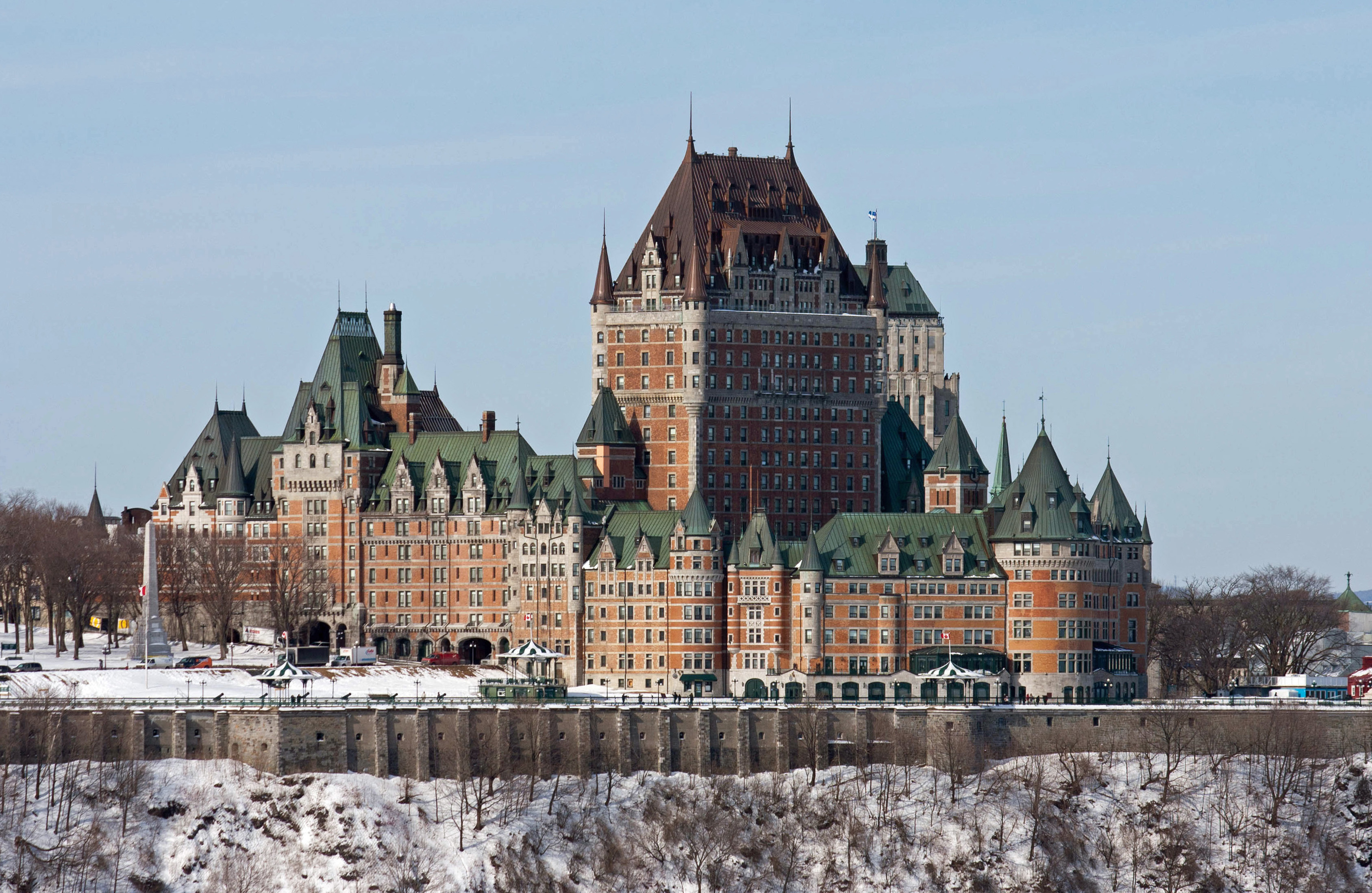
Château Frontenac in Quebec City

The CPR owned and operated a chain of Canadian Pacific Hotels across the country. Coleman served as president of the Hotel Vancouver Company, a director of the Château Frontenac Company, and president of the Seigniory Club based at the Château Montebello. In 1943 and 1944, the Government of Canada wanted exclusive use of the Château Frontenac for war time meetings that became the First Quebec Conference and the Second Quebec Conference. Coleman negotiated usage by the government via the under Secretary of State for Canada who was his younger brother, Ephraim Herbert Coleman, and requested not be told any classified information nor why the hotel was wanted.

Coleman maintained good relations between the CPR and its unionized workers. He felt that the company should "treat all employees with fairness, frankness and consideration". His experience in working up the ranks of CPR led him to believe that, "the great majority resent being patronized, want to be recognized as self-respecting citizens, and treated accordingly". He believed in building human resources from within the CPR and giving authority to the right men.

Coleman retired from the CPR on February 1, 1947, and remained a company director for life.

== Other business interests ==
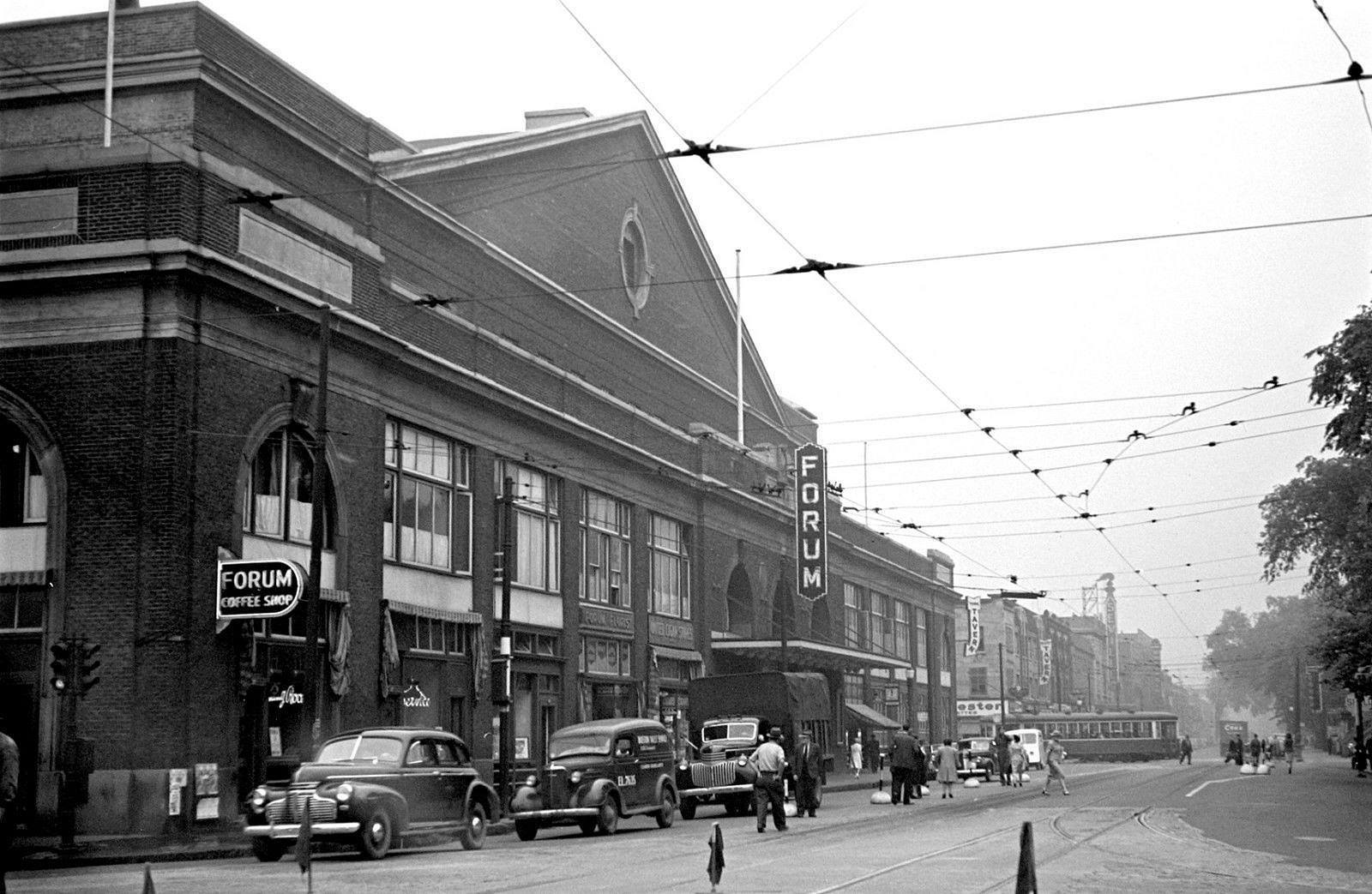
The Montreal Forum c. 1945

Coleman maintained other business interests including the financial sector. He was a president and director of The Scottish Mortgage and Trust Company Limited when it ventured into North America. He served as a director of the Metropolitan Life Insurance Company of New York, the Bank of Montreal and Royal Trust.

He also served as a director for the Canadian Marconi Company which operated wireless telegraphy, and was a member of the Canadian committee for the Hudson's Bay Company.

When the Western Canada Hockey League was in financial trouble during 1926, Coleman offered assistance to the league but his letter to Lester Patrick and Frank Patrick arrived too late and the league disbanded. After moving to Montreal, Coleman became a director of the Canadian Arena Company and was a vice-president of the Montreal Canadiens. The company had built the Montreal Forum which was the home arena to the Canadiens.

Coleman owned a horse racing stable and several thoroughbreds. He owned Western Prince which won the Canadian Derby in 1943 at the Polo Park Racetrack in Winnipeg. According to an article in Maclean's, his horses were supported by fellow CPR employees and a porter once reportedly said to a passenger "See, sir, our horse won today".

== Governor of universities ==
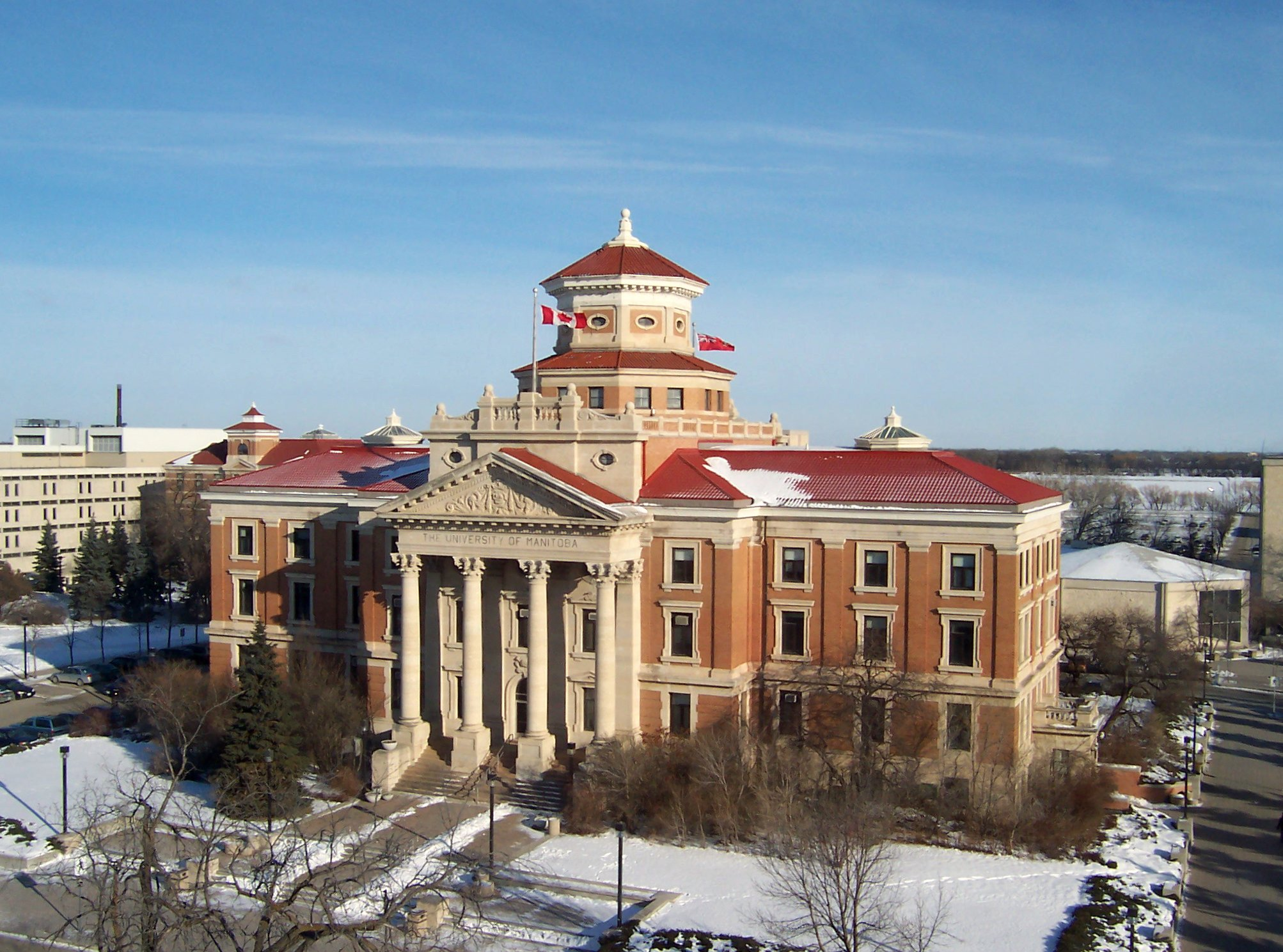
University of Manitoba administration building

Coleman served as chairman of the board of governors of the University of Manitoba from 1933 to 1934. His leadership coincided with guiding the university through the financial strain of the Great Depression. After relocating to Montreal in 1934, he served as a governor of McGill University and was on the executive committee of University of Bishop's College. He stated in a 1944 interview that, "humanities should be sacrificed to so-called practical courses" and that "our medical men, engineers and others should have the best training obtainable in the world".

== Community involvement ==
Coleman served as president of the Manitoba division of the Navy League of Canada for 10 years. He also served as a governor for the Montreal division of the Navy League of Canada. Under his leadership, the Canadian Navy League Cadet Corps was described by British naval officer Gordon Campbell as the "best cadet corps in the British Empire".

Coleman was a member of several gentlemen's clubs across Canada including the Manitoba Club. He was a president of the Canadian Club of Winnipeg, a non-profit speakers' forum. He served as vice-president of the City Improvement League of Montreal, and was a chairman of the Canadian committee of the Newcomen Society. He was a patron of the Royal Canadian Legion and the Royal Commonwealth Ex-Services League. He served as a governor for The Canadian General Council of The Boy Scouts Association, the Shawbridge Boys' Farm and Montreal Festivals.

Coleman was a director for three hospitals in Montreal, including the Montreal General Hospital, the Royal Victoria Hospital and the Notre Dame Hospital.

== Personal life and family ==
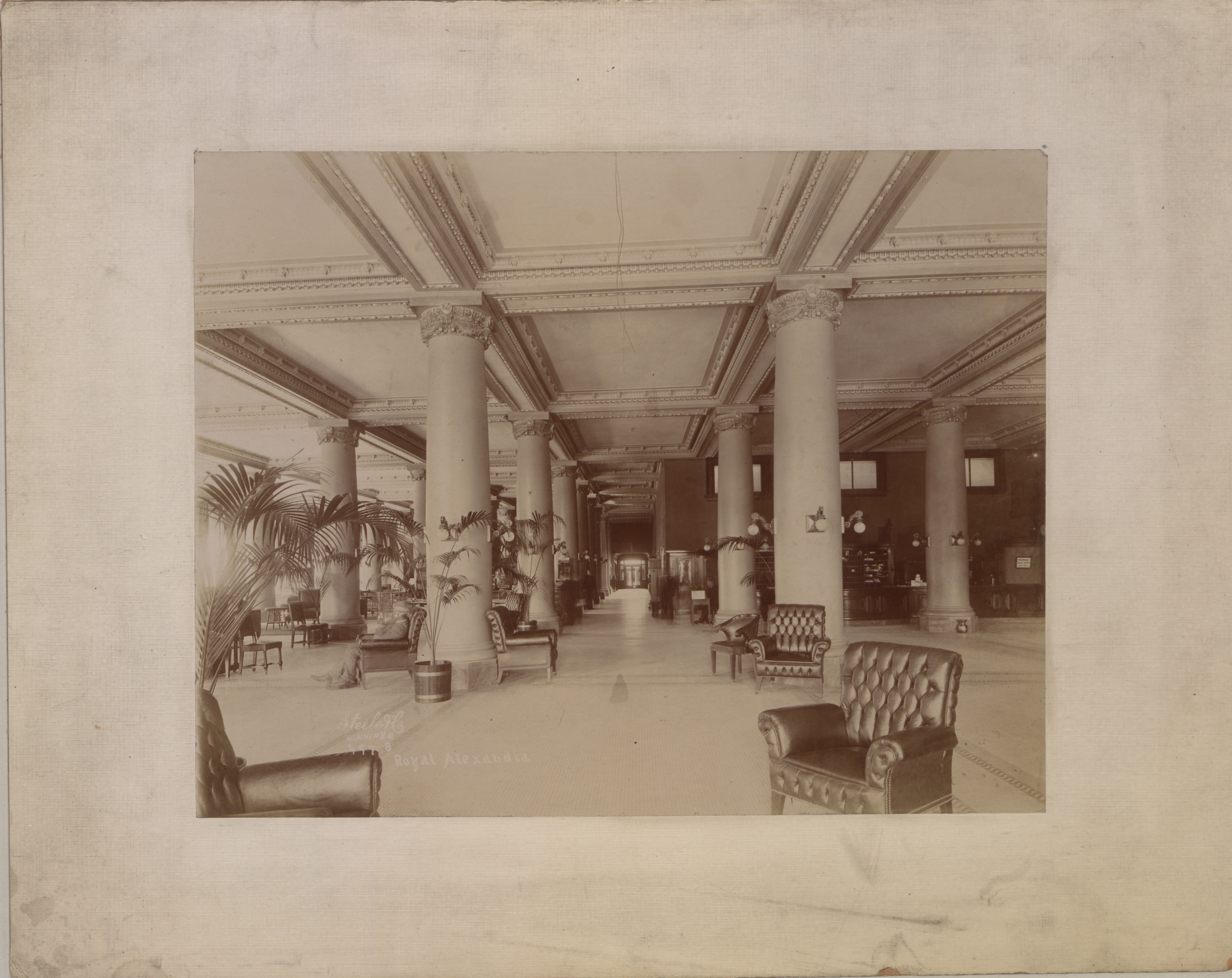
Royal Alexandra Hotel rotunda

Coleman married Anna Grant in 1906, and they had two sons including Rowan and Jim Coleman. Anna died in 1920, and Coleman was remarried in 1922, to Florence Lynch. He moved frequently with his work and lived in suites at Canadian Pacific Hotels from Vancouver to Montreal. He spent eight years at the Royal Alexandra Hotel in Winnipeg from 1922 to 1930.

Coleman attending sports events in Canada and the United States with his sons, including the 1925 Stanley Cup Finals, horse races at Saratoga Springs, New York, and games at the World Series. His sons would ride across the country in the care of a train conductor to meet their father, often with a limousine waiting. Jim Coleman recalled that he and his brother took turns sitting beside their father at games, and stated "It was a painful business. Dad didn't shout much but he body checked all through the game".

Coleman made a hobby of recreational fishing at the Lake of the Woods. He gave up playing golf and contract bridge since he felt they were "a waste of time". Jim Coleman stated that his father had a good memory, and could recall the minutes and seconds of world records held in horse racing, and knew statistics for British cricket players despite not seeing a match in person.

Coleman kept a personal library on Canadiana and the history of Western Canada. The collection was reported by The Canadian Press to be the best in the country at the time. He encouraged his sons to read about history and world events and started them with the New York Herald Tribune. His son Rowan became a soldier and served with the Princess Patricia's Canadian Light Infantry during World War II. His son Jim became a syndicated sports journalist who credited his father for a love of horse racing, ice hockey and Canadian football.

Coleman's brother Ephraim Herbert Coleman served as the under Secretary of State for Canada from 1933 to 1949, was the Canadian Ambassador to Cuba and then Brazil between 1950 and 1954, and later was the Dean of Law at the University of Manitoba.

Coleman died at home in Montreal on October 17, 1956, after an illness of several months. His funeral was held on October 20, 1956, at Douglas Church in Montreal, followed by burial in Arnprior, Ontario.

== Honours and legacy ==
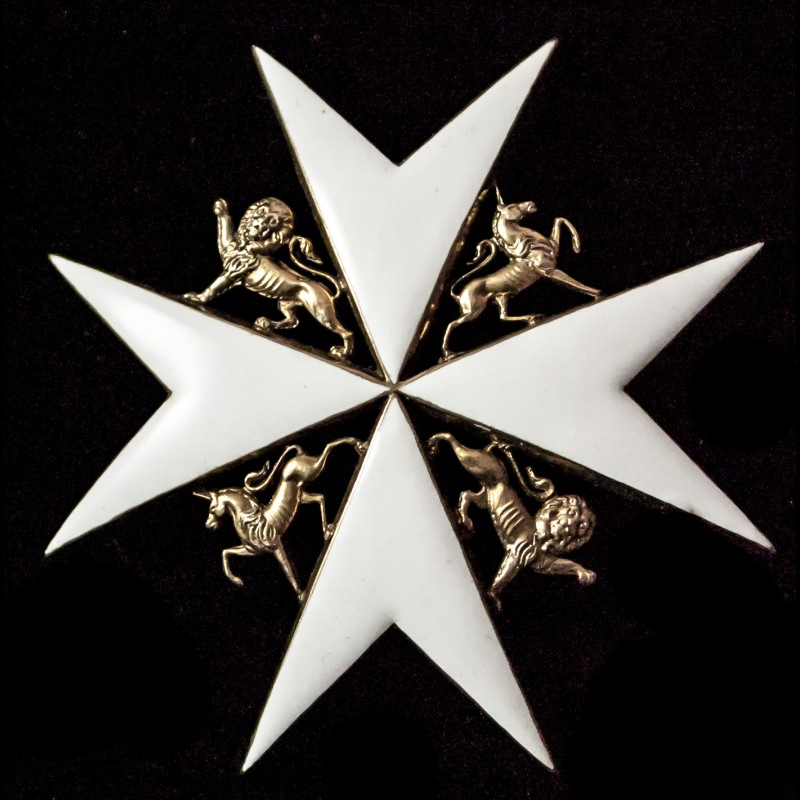
Order of Saint John star

The Winnipeg Tribune described Coleman as "modest" and "affable" which "won him the affection of thousands of fellow workers and fellow citizens", and also credited him for developing the CPR into an efficient means of war time logistics for Canada.

Coleman received an honorary Doctor of Law degree from the University of Manitoba in 1932, and an honorary Doctor of Civil Law degree from the University of Bishop's College in 1937.

Coleman was invested as a Knight of Grace in The Most Venerable Order of the Hospital of St. John of Jerusalem in October 1943, by the Governor General of Canada the Earl of Athlone in recognition of contributions towards home nursing in Canada. He was appointed a Companion of the Order of St Michael and St George in June 1946.

Coleman was an honorary president of the Navy League of Canada and the Association of Canadian Clubs of Canada. He was a life member of the Canadian Club of Winnipeg, and was given the honorary tribal chief title of "Chief of the Iron Trails" by the Piapot.

== Bibliography ==
- Taylor, Jim (2005). The best of Jim Coleman: Fifty years of Canadian sport from the man who saw it all. Madeira Park, British Columbia: Harbour Publishing. ISBN 978-1-55017-359-8.
- Kidd, Bruce (2017). The Struggle for Canadian Sport. Toronto, Ontario: University of Toronto Press. ISBN 9781487516857.

Business positions
Preceded by Edward Wentworth Beatty	President of Canadian Pacific Railway Limited; 1942 – 1947	Succeeded by William Mertin Neal
