= Arnprior District High School =

Arnprior District High School (ADHS)

Location
- 59 Ottawa St; Arnprior, Ontario, K7S 1X2; Canada; 45°26′20″N 76°21′15″W

Information
- School type: Public, high school
- Motto: Hodie non cras
- Founded: 1876
- School board: Renfrew County District School Board
- Area trustee: Kim Dunsmour Lough; Sam Abbott (Student Trustee); Sean McCloskey (Student Trustee)
- Administrator: Glenda Munro
- Principal: Sam Noack
- Vice Principal: Vicki Wilson
- Grades: 9–12
- Enrollment: 712 (May 2013)
- Language: English
- Colours: Red and White
- Team name: Rapids
- Website: adh.rcdsb.on.ca/en

Arnprior District High School is a high school in Arnprior, Renfrew County, Ontario, Canada. It is in the Renfrew County District School Board. The school's teams are known as the Rapids and its colours are red and white.

== Name Change ==
In 2017, it was announced that Arnprior District High School would be changing their name for their sports teams from the historic Arnprior Redmen to the Arnprior Rapids.

== Sports ==
The Arnprior Rapids compete in the Upper Ottawa Valley High School Athletics Association (UOVHSAA) at the county level and competes in the Eastern Ontario Secondary School Athletic Association (EOSSAA) at the district level.

The Rapids senior football team went undefeated in 2011 and 2012, winning the National Capital Bowl AA provincial championship both years. The Rapids have found recent success in 2017 going 10–1 on their way to win the National Capital Bowl against Nantyr Shores High School. The Junior football team of 2018 also had recent success with their season going 8-0 throughout the season and going on to win the county finals

The Rapids rugby team has also found success in the past years with winning 3 straight EOSSAA championships (2014–2017) and won 4th place at OFSAA in 2015 and 2017.

Other School Sports Include; Hockey, Alpine Skiing, Badminton, Varsity Snowboarding, Tennis, Volleyball, Cross Country, Track and Field

=== Rivalries ===
Arnprior shares a historic rivalry with Renfrew Collegiate Institute Raiders (RCI).

As a result of recent footballing success from both teams, the Rapids have also found a new football rivalry with Almonte and District High School Thunderbolts (ADHS).

== Notable alumni ==
- D'Alton Corry Coleman (1879–1956), president of Canadian Pacific Railway

== See also ==
- Education in Ontario
- List of secondary schools in Ontario
