= Keys Public School =

Location
- Brockhouse Way, Box 398; Deep River, Ontario, K0J 1P0; Canada; 46.10355°N 77.48867°W

Information
- Founded: 1955
- Status: Closed
- School board: Renfrew County District School Board
- Grades: K-8
- Mascot: Cougar

Keys Public School was a 5 classroom school located inside C. J. Mackenzie High School in Deep River, Ontario, Canada.

== History ==
Keys School was founded in 1955 and named after Dr. DA Keys, a vice-president of Atomic Energy of Canada Limited. The school served students in kindergarten through eighth grade. By the time the original building closed at the end of the 2004–2005 school year, Keys served fifth through eighth grade students.

With the 2005 closure of the original building, the fifth and sixth grades were moved to Morison Public School and the seventh and eighth grades were moved to a wing at Mackenzie High School. The former Keys Public School building was leased by Atomic Energy of Canada Limited for use as an office building.

Due to declining enrollment, in 2011 T. W. Morrison Public School, Keys Public School, and C. J. Mackenzie High School were amalgamated into Mackenzie Community School.
