= Madawaska Valley District High School =

Madawaska Valley District School

Location
- 341 John Street, Barry's Bay, Ontario; Canada; 45.4828°N 77.6743°W

Information
- Former name: Madawaska Valley District High School, Sherwood Public School
- Type: Public secondary school
- Motto: Amor Doctrinae Floreat ("May the love of learning flourish")
- Opened: 1967
- School district: Renfrew County District School Board
- Principal: Kim Carruthers
- Grades: Junior Kindergarten to 12
- Enrollment: Under 400 (approx.)
- Colors: Blue and Gold
- Mascot: "Waska" (since 2010)
- Team name: Wolves
- Website: http://mvd.rcdsb.on.ca/en/

Madawaska Valley District School (MVDS) is a public high school situated in the village of Barry's Bay, Ontario, Canada. It is managed by Renfrew County District School Board. The school was opened in 1967, and has been operating as the public high school for the area ever since. MVDS is one of few high schools in the area, and was attended by 419 students in 2012, and offered classes for students in grades 9–12 until the merging of the elementary school - now offering classes for students from junior kindergarten to grade 12. Some of the faculty are MV Graduates.

In 2016, Sherwood Public School and Madawaska Valley District High School merged into one building, with the elementary occupying the high school's former "B-Wing". Madawaska Valley District High School was renamed to Madawaska Valley District School after the merging of the two schools in 2024.

== Notable alumni ==
Notable alumni of MVDS include:

- Larry Trader, retired NHL hockey player
- Benjamin Rivers, illustrator/game designer
- Sean Conway, university professor and former MPP
- Patricia Burchat, particle physicist at Stanford University

== See also ==
- Education in Ontario
- List of secondary schools in Ontario
