= Melissa Franklin =

Particle physicist

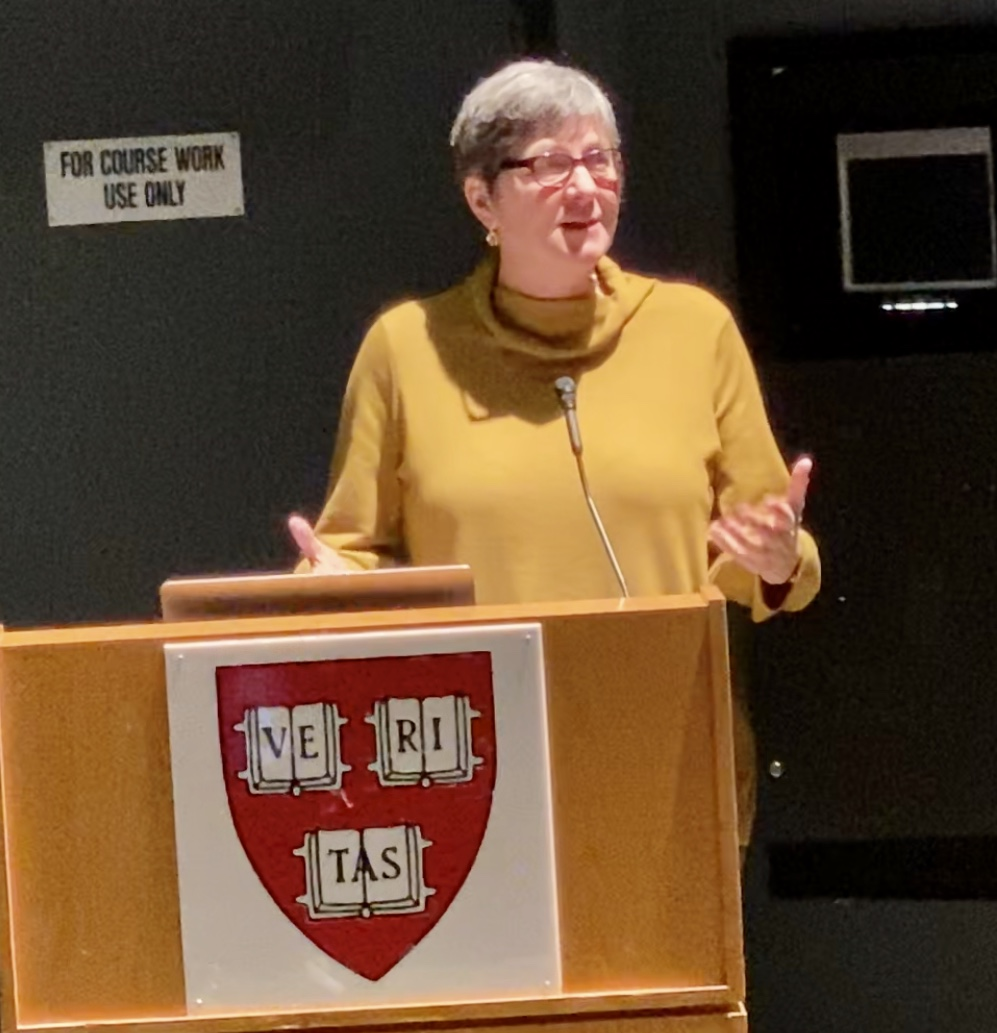
- Born: September 30, 1956 (age 69); Edmonton, Alberta, Canada
- Education: University of Toronto; Stanford University
- Scientific career
- Workplaces: Fermilab; Harvard University; University of Illinois; University of California Berkeley
- Thesis: Selected studies of charmonium decay (1982)
- Doctoral advisor: Gary Feldman; Martin Perl
- Doctoral students: David Kestenbaum (more than 20 doctoral students total)

Melissa Eve Bronwen Franklin (born September 30, 1956) is a Canadian experimental particle physicist and the Mallinckrodt Professor of Physics at Harvard University. In 1992, Franklin became the first woman to receive tenure in the physics department at Harvard University and she served as chair of the department from 2010 to 2014. While working at Fermi National Accelerator Laboratory in Chicago, her team found some of the first evidences for the existence of the top quark. In 1993, Franklin was elected a fellow of the American Physical Society. She is a member of the CDF (Fermilab) and ATLAS (CERN) collaborations.

== Early life and education ==
Franklin was born in Edmonton, Alberta and grew up first in Vancouver, British Columbia and then Toronto, Ontario, where her family moved in 1962. Her father, Stephen Franklin, was a British-born journalist who worked as drama critic for the Ottawa Journal and later as staff writer and editor for Weekend magazine. Her mother, Elsa, was a television producer as well as Canadian author Pierre Berton's manager and literary agent. Melissa Franklin dropped out of high school to form an alternative school with friends, SEED Alternative School, and later attended the Lycee Francais Charles de Gaulle in London. She took courses in physics, religious studies and philosophy at the University of Toronto, graduating with a bachelor of science in 1977. In the summer of 1975 and 1976, she was a summer research associate at the University of Toronto working at Fermilab. In the summer of 1977 while Melissa Franklin was a student at CERN, she was part of a legendary bar-room bet with John Ellis which in part led to the naming of Penguin diagrams.

== Career ==
Franklin earned her physics PhD from Stanford University in 1982 with a thesis titled "Selected studies of charmonium decay" under the supervision of Gary Feldman and Martin Perl, working with the school's linear accelerator, SLAC. She did postdoctoral work at the University of California at Berkeley in the Lawrence Berkeley Laboratory. In 1988 she became an assistant professor at the University of Illinois, and worked at Fermilab in Chicago. In 1987 she joined Harvard University, later becoming the physics department's first tenured woman professor. For over a decade, Franklin traveled between Boston and Chicago every few weeks, to check on and fix equipment at Fermilab. In 1995, her team proved the existence of the top quark.

At Harvard, Franklin co-directs the Laboratory for Particle Physics and Cosmology (LPPC), alongside Gary Feldman, John Huth, Masahiro Morii and Christopher Stubbs. The LPPC studies topics on the Energy Frontier, the Intensity Frontier and the Cosmic Frontier.

Since the 1990s, Franklin has been a frequent guest on the CBC Radio science program Quirks and Quarks. Franklin has also been a frequent lecturer and "dramatic read[er]" in the annual Ig Nobel Prize Ceremonies and other events of the Annals of Improbable Research.
