= Stephanie A. Majewski =

American particle physicist

- Born: 1981 (age 44–45)
- Education: Stanford University; University of Illinois at Urbana–Champaign
- Awards: 2002 - Laura B. Eisenstein award at UIUC; 2014 - US DOE award, Early Career Research Program
- Scientific career
- Fields: High energy particle physics
- Thesis: Study of B-meson Decays to Final States with a Single Charm Baryon (2007)
- Doctoral advisor: Patricia Burchat

Stephanie A. Majewski (born 1981) is an American physicist at the University of Oregon (UO) researching high energy particle physics at the CERN ATLAS experiment. She worked as a postdoctoral research associate at the Brookhaven National Laboratory prior to joining the faculty at UO in 2012. She was selected for the Early Career Research Program award of the U.S. Department of Energy (DOE), one of 35 scientists in all DOE-supported fields to receive this national honor in 2014.

== Personal life and education ==
Stephanie Majewski, daughter of Connie Ninos and Walter Majewski of LaGrange, Illinois, was born in 1981. She married Ken Bischel in 2016; they live in Eugene, Oregon. In 1998 Majewski began her baccalaureate degree as a viola performance major at the University of Illinois at Urbana–Champaign (UIUC) before switching to physics. She completed a National Science Foundation summer science research experience for undergraduates at the University of Florida in summer 2000. In 2002 she earned Bachelor of Science in physics with high distinction, winning the Laura B. Eisenstein award at UIUC as the outstanding woman in physics. In August 2007 Majewski completed her Ph.D. in applied physics at Stanford University, based on data collected at the SLAC National Accelerator Laboratory.

== Career ==
Majewski held a postdoctoral fellowship at Brookhaven National Laboratory between 2007–2012, working on the ATLAS experiment at the Large Hadron Collider (LHC) at CERN, where her job was described as "making sure that the ATLAS liquid argon calorimeter — a central piece of the detector — is correctly measuring the particles produced from the LHC's extremely energetic proton-proton collisions". Scientific American quoted her enthusiasm for the LHC work: "It's the place to be for particle physics... This may be the last large accelerator that turns on, at least for awhile."

In December 2012 she joined the UO physics faculty. Majewski is interested in "looking for evidence of supersymmetry, the theory linked to dark matter, where each particle has a 'super' partner." She leads a group of Oregon researchers, including a postdoctoral fellow and graduate students, in the search for supersymmetry. She has also continued work in ATLAS detector hardware upgrades related to the liquid argon calorimeter. Majewski involves undergraduates in the ATLAS research effort; they work on programming new algorithms to sort or filter events for an upgrade of the calorimeter.

In July 2012, Majewski collaborated with ATLAS colleagues in the discovery of the Higgs Boson.

== Awards ==
In 2014, Majewski was awarded the U.S. Department of Energy Early Career Research Program award, "supporting our most creative and productive researchers early in their careers". The program awards significant financial support for five years, at least US$150,000 annually for research expenses and summer salary.

== Selected publications ==
Majewski is co-author on more than 750 of the collaboration's published papers. These included:

2012 - "Observation of a new particle in the search for the Standard Model Higgs boson with the ATLAS detector at the LHC."

2014 - "Search for direct pair production of the top squark in all-hadronic final states in proton-proton collisions at TeV with the ATLAS detector."

== See also ==
- Elementary particles
