= Gary Feldman =

American particle physicist

Gary J. Feldman
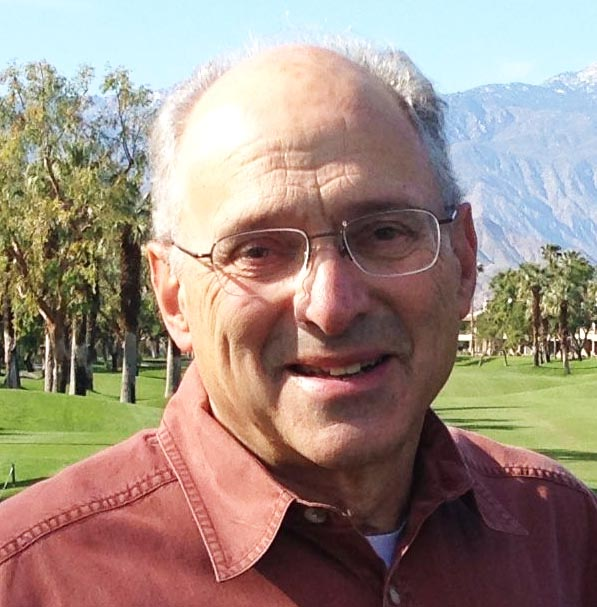
- Born: 1942; Cheyenne, WY
- Education: University of Chicago (BA); Harvard University (MA, PhD)
- Spouse: Frances Y. Feldman
- Scientific career
- Fields: Particle physics
- Thesis: Determination of the Pion Form Factor
- Doctoral advisor: Francis M. Pipkin
- Notable students: Melissa Franklin; Patricia Burchat

Gary J. Feldman is an American particle physicist who works on neutrino physics with the NOvA experiment based at Fermilab.

== Early life and education ==
Feldman was born in Cheyenne, Wyoming and was raised in South Bend, Indiana. His father immigrated from Poland to the United States as a child shortly after World War I. Feldman's father attended college at the City University of New York and received his medical training at the University of Basel.

Feldman developed an interest in physics in high school after attending an open house at the University of Notre Dame. He decided to start college as a physics major with the condition that he study whatever was most interesting to him. He claims he "never found anything that interests me more". Feldman moved to Harvard for graduate school, where he attained his PhD.

== Career ==
After graduate school, Feldman moved to SLAC in 1971. He participated in the Mark 1 experiment at SPEAR, which was responsible for two Nobel Prizes: one for the discovery of the charm quark (Burton Richter in 1976) and the other for the discovery of the tau lepton (Martin Perl in 1995). Feldman was a co-spokesperson for the Mark 2 experiment at the Stanford Linear Collider.

In 1990 Feldman moved back to Harvard as a professor. Feldman participated in the NOMAD experiment at CERN and the MINOS experiment at Fermilab. He was a co-spokesperson for the NOvA experiment at Fermilab from its design to early data-taking phases, spanning 11 years.

Feldman chaired the Harvard Physics Department from 1994 to 1997.

Feldman is a fellow of the American Physical Society and a member of the American Academy of Arts and Sciences.

Feldman now serves as Frank B. Baird, Jr. Professor of Science, Emeritus at Harvard and continues work on the NOvA experiment.
