= Renfrew County District School Board =

School board in Ontario, Canada

Location
- 1270 Pembroke St. W. Pembroke, Ontario; K8A 4G4 Canada
- Coordinates: 45°49′58″N 77°08′57″W

District information
- Schools: 20 elementary 1 intermediate 7 secondary
- Budget: CA$105 million million
- District ID: B66214

Students and staff
- Students: 9,500 approx

Other information
- Website: www.renfrew.edu.on.ca

The Renfrew County District School Board (RCDSB, known as English-language Public District School Board No. 28 prior to 1999) is the administrative body overseeing the operations of the primary and secondary schools in the County of Renfrew in Ontario, Canada. The administrative office is located in Pembroke, Ontario. Whilst Valour school being the biggest out of the county, located in Petawawa Ontario

== Schools ==
The elementary schools managed by the RCDSB are:

Elementary Schools	Location
Admanston Public School	Renfrew
A.J. Charbonneau Public School	Arnprior
Beachburg Public School	Beachburg
Central Public School	Renfrew
Champlain Discovery Public School	Pembroke
Cobden Public School	Cobden
Eganville Public School	Eganville
Herman Street Public School	Petawawa
Highview Public School	Pembroke
Killaloe Public School	Killaloe
Mackenzie Community School	Deep River
McNab Public School	Arnprior
Palmer Rapids Public School	Palmer Rapids
Pine View Public School	Petawawa
Queen Elizabeth Public School	Renfrew
Rockwood Public School	Pembroke
Sherwood Public School	Barry's Bay
Valour JK-12 School	Petawawa
Walter Zadow Public School	Arnprior
Whitney Public School	Whitney

Intermediate Schools	Location
Renfrew Collegiate Intermediate School	Renfrew

The secondary schools managed by the RCDSB are:

High Schools	Location
Arnprior District High School	Arnprior
Fellowes High School	Pembroke
Mackenzie Community School	Deep River
Madawaska Valley District High School	Barry's Bay
Opeongo High School	Douglas
Renfrew Collegiate Institute	Renfrew
Valour JK-12 School	Petawawa

== Amalgamation September 2009 ==
The Airy and Sabine District School Area Board and Murchison and Lyell School Board were amalgamated with the RCDSB on September 1, 2009. The former added Whitney Public School, located in the community of Whitney near the east gate of Algonquin Provincial Park, and the latter Madawaska Public School in Madawaska to the RCDSB.

== Trustees ==
Board Trustees for the 2019–2020 academic school year:

Trustee	Location	School
Marjorie Adam	Deep River Area, Deep River, Ontario	Mackenzie Community School
Leo Boland	City of Pembroke, Pembroke, Ontario	Champlain Discovery Public School, Highview Public School, Fellowes High School
Mike Gunette	Laurentian Valley, North Algona Wilberforce	Champlain Discovery Public School, Rockwood Public School, Eganville District Public School, Cobden Public School, Fellowes High School, Opeongo High School
Susan Humphries (Chairwoman)	Renfrew, Greater Madawaska, Horton	Central Public School, Queen Elizabeth Public School, Renfrew Collegiate Intermediate School, Renfrew Collegiate Institute
David F. Kaiser	Bonnechere Valley, Killaloe, Hagarty and Richards, Madawaska Valley; Brudenell, Lyndoch and Raglan, South Algonquin	Killaloe Public School, Madawaska Public School, Palmer Rapids Public School, Sherwood Public School, Sherwood Public School, Whitney Public School, Eganville District Public School, Madawaska Valley District High School, Opeongo High School
Nic Edge	Arnprior, McNab-Braeside	A. J. Charbonneau Public School, Walter Zadow Public School, McNab Public School, Arnprior District High School
Bryon Morris (Vice-Chairman)	Town of Petawawa, CFB Petawawa, Petawawa, Ontario	Herman Street Public School, Pine View Public School, Valour School
Dave Shields	Whitewater Region, Admaston Bromley	Cobden Public School, Beachburg Public School, Admaston Public School, Fellowes High School, Opeongo High School

=== Student Trustees ===
There are two non-voting student trustees who are elected by the executive members of the student councils from the seven high schools. They serve two-year terms, with one trustee being replaced each year. The current students fulfilling the role as Student Trustee are Hudson Arbour of Mackenzie Community School K-12 and Sam Abbott of Valour School K-12.

== See also ==
- List of school districts in Ontario
- List of high schools in Ontario
- Keys Public School
