= The Arthur Pequegnat Clock Company =

Clock company

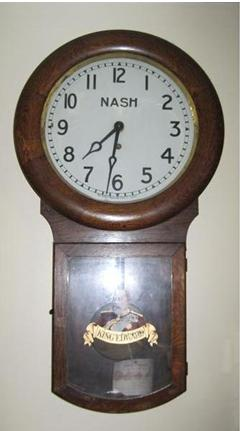
- Pequegnat King Edward 2nd edition, time only
- Industry: Clock manufacturing
- Founded: 1904; 122 years ago
- Founder: Arthur Pequegnat
- Defunct: 1964
- Fate: Ended production in 1943; dissolved in 1964
- Headquarters: Kitchener, Ontario, Canada

The Arthur Pequegnat Clock Company is notable as the longest-lasting Canadian-based clock manufacturer. Company advertisements explained the pronunciation of the name as "Say Peginaw." The company was also the first in Canada to successfully mass-produce clocks.

== Pequegnat Family ==
Arthur Ulysses Pequegnat was born in La Chaux-de-Fonds, Neuchâtel, Switzerland, to a primarily French-speaking family. His father, Ulysses Pequegnat (1826–94), was a watchmaker. The Pequegnat family immigrated from Switzerland in 1874, and initially started a business of importing watches for the local market in Berlin (now Kitchener, Ontario). Soon, Arthur Pequegnat and his seven brothers owned a chain of jewellery stores throughout Southwestern Ontario, operating as a kind of family conglomerate. At the time, the Canadian clock market was dominated by American manufacturers, and three separate attempts between 1872 and 1886 to start a Canadian clock manufacturing industry had failed. Even a 35% tariff on the importation of foreign clocks instituted by Canada's Finance Minister Samuel Leonard Tilley under the Conservative Party's National Policy was unable to preserve some early clock companies, such as the Canada Clock Company or the Hamilton Clock Company.

== History ==
In the late 19th century, the bicycle market began to change dramatically, spurred by technical innovations and the rise of mass production. Public perception shifted from seeing them as an elite item for sportsmen into an everyday mode of transportation with the advent of the safety bicycle, in one of several "Bicycle Booms". Pequegnat saw potential and chose to join the bicycle industry, first by starting a small bicycle repair shop in the back of his jewellery shop. This soon expanded into a three-storey "Bicycle Emporium" at 53–61 Frederick Street, Berlin. Pequegnat would not stop at retail, however, and by 1897 had closed his jewellery shop and begun to manufacture bicycles under the name "Berlin & Racycle Manufacturing Company", producing the "Racycle" style of safety bicycle in conjunction with the Miami Cycle and Manufacturing Company of Middletown, Ohio. Business was brisk, and included customers such as the Berlin Police Department, which issued Racycles to its entire staff. At the time, the Racycle was known as a high-quality model, and had the notable technical innovation of the bearing on the crank hangar being placed outside the crank attachment; the company prominently claimed that the design conserved 27% of the rider's effort.

Around 1900–03, however, Pequegnat began to foresee the decline of the bicycle industry, and started to retool his factory on Frederick Street to experiment with clockmaking. In 1904, Pequegnat was ready to scale up production, and distributed his first product catalogue to jewellers around Canada. The early clocks sold well, and customers included school boards and railway companies, both of which needed reliable wall clocks to operate.

Most of their model names were based on Canadian cities. According to the Canadian Clock Museum, "approximately sixty-five catalogued models of mantel clock are known, as well as sixteen models of wall clock (with variations) and seven models of grandfather (hall) clock." Rare samples exist of Pequegnat clocks built into a sideboard, or a grandfather clock/gramophone combination. Pequegnat was also instrumental in the production of parts for the Franco-American Clock Company whose clocks mimicked the German box or Vienna regulators.

The company distinguished itself as a competitor for some of the better American pendulum clocks, such as those made by Seth Thomas. Their clocks often looked like models made by Seth Thomas or Sessions but some of their designs, especially the tall mantle clocks, were unique. For their wooden cases, they favoured the heart wood of quarter-sawn white oak that showed off beautiful ray flecks. The designs often had elements of the Arts and Crafts Movement which also favoured quarter-sawn white oak.

The company's fortunes began to change during the First World War. Amidst the anti-German sentiment and social turmoil around the renaming of Berlin to Kitchener, the company's Berlin clock model was renamed "Berlyn", then discontinued altogether. Materials were harder to obtain during the war, especially metal, with components often being replaced with wood. Arthur Pequegnat died in 1927, leaving the company without his business leadership, though his son Edmond took over management. With hydroelectric power now abundant and powering Canadian cities, wound mechanical clocks were increasingly supplanted by electric clocks. This time, the company failed to adapt to a changing economy. The Second World War once again created shortages of materials such as brass, and production largely stopped by 1941, with all production ceasing by 1943.

After the war, the company survived for a time with a repair business, as well as operating as a wholesaler for Westclox. During this time, Arthur's sons maintained their involvement in the company, with Marcel Pequegnat, then a municipal civil engineer and superintendent of the Kitchener Water Commission since 1919, having served as president of the company since 1940. Edmond Pequegnat died in 1963 and the company was wound down in 1964. In 1965, a new Kitchener Water Commission head office was constructed on the site of the former Pequegnat plant on Frederick Street.

Today, their clocks are regarded highly collectible in Canada, and command twice the price of similarly styled clocks by prominent American counterparts. One aspect of their collectability has been described as the high number of variants, with time-only, time and strike, or either of these with calendar. The company's design technique was to start a run with one style of trim and complete the run with a different style, not uncommonly creating a unique sample. The Canada Science and Technology Museum’s collection features over eighty Pequegnat clocks, mostly acquired in 1975, the second largest of amount in a public collection. The largest private collection,of over 170 models is held by Skip and Caren Kerr in Edmonton, Alberta and represents over 30 years of collecting.

The Canadian Clock Museum, which is dedicated to clocks from the Arthur Pequegnat Clock Company, is located in Deep River, Ontario.
