= Jack Mackenzie =

Chalmers Jack Mackenzie
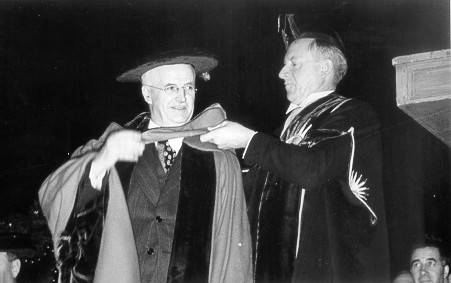
- Chalmers Jack Mackenzie (on left) receiving honorary degree from the University of British Columbia. October 1947
- Born: July 10, 1888; St. Stephen, New Brunswick, Canada
- Died: February 26, 1984 (aged 95); Ottawa, Ontario, Canada
- Awards: Order of Canada, Fellow of the Royal Society

Chalmers Jack Mackenzie, CC CMG MC FRS FRSC (July 10, 1888 – February 26, 1984) was a Canadian civil engineer, chancellor of Carleton University, president of the National Research Council, first president of Atomic Energy of Canada Limited, first president of Atomic Energy Control Board and instrumental in the development of science and engineering education in Canada.

He was born in St. Stephen, New Brunswick, the youngest of six children of James and Janet MacKenzie. He attended Milltown High School, then completed a Bachelor of Engineering at Dalhousie University in 1909 and a Masters in Engineering from Harvard University in 1915.

In 1912 he was hired to develop an engineering program at the University of Saskatchewan. He served in the Canadian Army during World War I (1915-1918). After the war he continued at the University of Saskatchewan until 1932, when he took a leave of absence to supervise public works projects. In 1939 he left Saskatchewan for Ottawa to become president of the National Research Council. In 1943 he received the Sir John Kennedy Medal.

In 1949 he sat on the Royal Commission on National Development in the Arts, Letters and Sciences, the so-called "Massey Commission", one objective of which was developing Canada's system of publicly funded research.

In 1967, he was made a Companion of the Order of Canada. He received honorary degrees from the University of Saskatchewan, the University of British Columbia, the University of Western Ontario, the University of Ottawa, McMaster University, Queen's University, and the University of New Brunswick.

The Mackenzie Engineering Building at Carleton University is named in his honour. The high school in Deep River, Ontario, Mackenzie Community School (formerly C.J. Mackenzie High School), is named in his honour.

Academic offices
| Preceded by Harry Stevenson Southam | Chancellor of Carleton College/Carleton University; 1954–1968 | Succeeded by Lester B. Pearson |
