= Patricia Burchat =

Canadian particle physicist

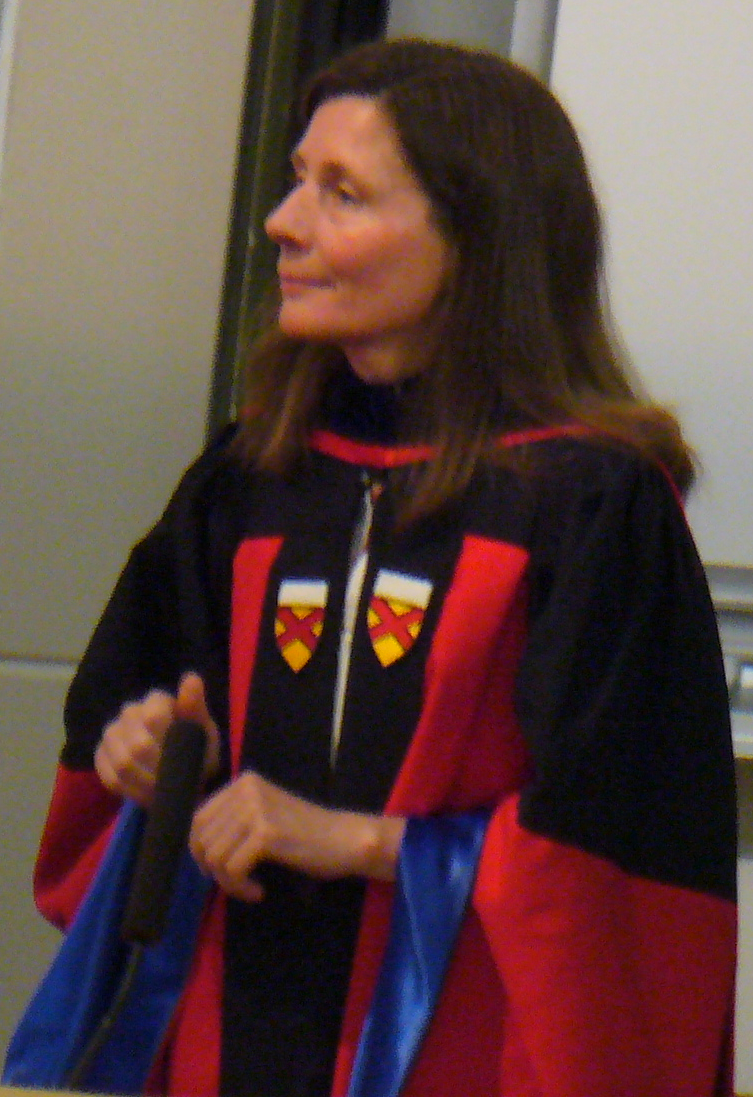
- Born: Patricia Rose Burchat; 1958 (age 67–68); Ontario, Canada
- Occupation: Professor of Physics
- Spouse: Tony Norcia
- Children: 2
- Awards: Fellow, American Association for the Advancement of Science; Fellow, American Physical Society; Gabilan Professor of Physics; Guggenheim Fellow

Academic background
- Education: B.S., University of Toronto; Ph.D., Stanford University
- Thesis: Decays of the Tau Lepton (1986)
- Doctoral advisor: Gary Feldman

Academic work
- Discipline: Physicist
- Sub-discipline: Experimental high energy physics Astrophysics
- Institutions: Stanford University
- Notable students: Stephanie A. Majewski
- Website: physics.stanford.edu/people/faculty/patricia-burchat

Patricia Burchat (born 1958) is the Gabilan Professor of Physics at Stanford University who researches experimental particle physics and cosmology. She is interested in mapping dark matter in the universe, and understanding the nature of dark energy. She was named a fellow of the American Physical Society in 2001, and a Guggenheim Fellow in 2005. In 2012 she became a fellow of the American Association for the Advancement of Science.

== Early life and education ==
Born in 1958, Burchat grew up in Barry's Bay, Ontario, Canada, and attended Madawaska Valley District High School. In 1981 she graduated with a B.S. in applied science and engineering from the University of Toronto, and earned a Ph.D. in physics at Stanford University in 1986.

== Career ==
Burchat held a postdoctoral fellowship at the University of California, Santa Cruz from 1986 to 1988, after which she joined the faculty until 1995. She has been a member of the Stanford Physics faculty since 1995, and served as the chair of the department from 2007 to 2010.

== Research ==
Burchat has been a member of multiple particle physics experiments, including the Mark II experiment at the SLAC Linear Collider and the E791 experiment at Fermilab. She was a founding member of the BaBar experiment at SLAC which explored fundamental particle interactions, especially the weak interaction. In these experiments she researched Z bosons as the carriers of the weak interaction, heavy neutral leptons, semileptonic decay of charm mesons, charm mixing, CP violations in B meson decays, and differences in the way matter and antimatter evolved in time.

Burchat has also been interested in investigating the cosmological evolution of the Universe. She joined the international community developing the Large Synoptic Survey Telescope, aiming to study gravitational bending of light by dark matter and the evolution of dark energy. Her 2008 TED talk, "Shedding light on dark matter", explores these two components making up about 96 percent of the universe.

== Awards and honors ==
- 2020 — Engineering Alumni Hall of Distinction Award, University of Toronto
- 2012 — Fellow, American Association for the Advancement of Science
- 2010 — Judith Pool Award, Northern California Chapter of the Association for Women in Science
- 2007 — Walter J. Gores Award, Stanford University
- 2006 — Gabilan Professor of Physics, Stanford University
- 2005 — Guggenheim Fellow, Stanford University (2005)
- 2004 — Sapp Family University Fellow in UG Education, Stanford University
- 2001 — Fellow, American Physical Society, cited "For her contributions to the understanding of heavy quark physics, particularly in semileptonic weak decays, in mixing of neutral D and B mesons, and in CP violation."

== See also ==
- The Dark Energy Survey
