= Jim Coleman (journalist) =

Canadian sports journalist, writer and press secretary (1911–2001)

- Born: James Alexander Coleman; October 30, 1911; Winnipeg, Manitoba, Canada
- Died: January 14, 2001 (aged 89); Vancouver, British Columbia, Canada
- Education: Victoria College; McGill University
- Occupations: Sports journalist, writer, press secretary
- Years active: 1931–2001
- Known for: Southam Newspapers; The Canadian Press; The Globe and Mail; The Province; The Winnipeg Tribune; Ontario Jockey Club; Calgary Stampede
- Notable work: The Jim Coleman Show
- Father: D'Alton Corry Coleman
- Awards: Order of Canada; Canada's Sports Hall of Fame; Canadian News Hall of Fame; Canadian Football Hall of Fame; Canadian Horse Racing Hall of Fame; Elmer Ferguson Memorial Award; Manitoba Hockey Hall of Fame

James Alexander Coleman CM (October 30, 1911 – January 14, 2001) was a Canadian sports journalist, writer and press secretary. His journalism career began with The Winnipeg Tribune in 1931, and included tenures with The Province and The Globe and Mail. He became Canada's first national print syndication sports columnist in 1950, writing for The Canadian Press and Southam Newspapers. He also appeared as a radio sports commentator and hosted The Jim Coleman Show on CBC Television, and served as press secretary for the Ontario Jockey Club and Stampede Park in Calgary. His father was D'Alton Corry Coleman, a former journalist and later president of the Canadian Pacific Railway. While travelling about North America to sporting events as a youth with his father, Coleman developed a lifelong love of horse racing, Canadian football and ice hockey.

Coleman was active for 70 years as a journalist, preferred to use a typewriter instead of a computer, wrote four books, and his final column was published on the day he died. Fellow journalist Milt Dunnell felt that Coleman "was one of the finest sports writers in North America". The Canadian Press described Coleman as "known for his colourful writing, encyclopedic memory, dapper dress and ever-present cigar". Coleman was a member of the Order of Canada, recipient of the Elmer Ferguson Memorial Award from the Hockey Hall of Fame, and was inducted into the Canadian News Hall of Fame, Canadian Football Hall of Fame, Canadian Horse Racing Hall of Fame, Canada's Sports Hall of Fame, and the Manitoba Hockey Hall of Fame.

== Early life ==
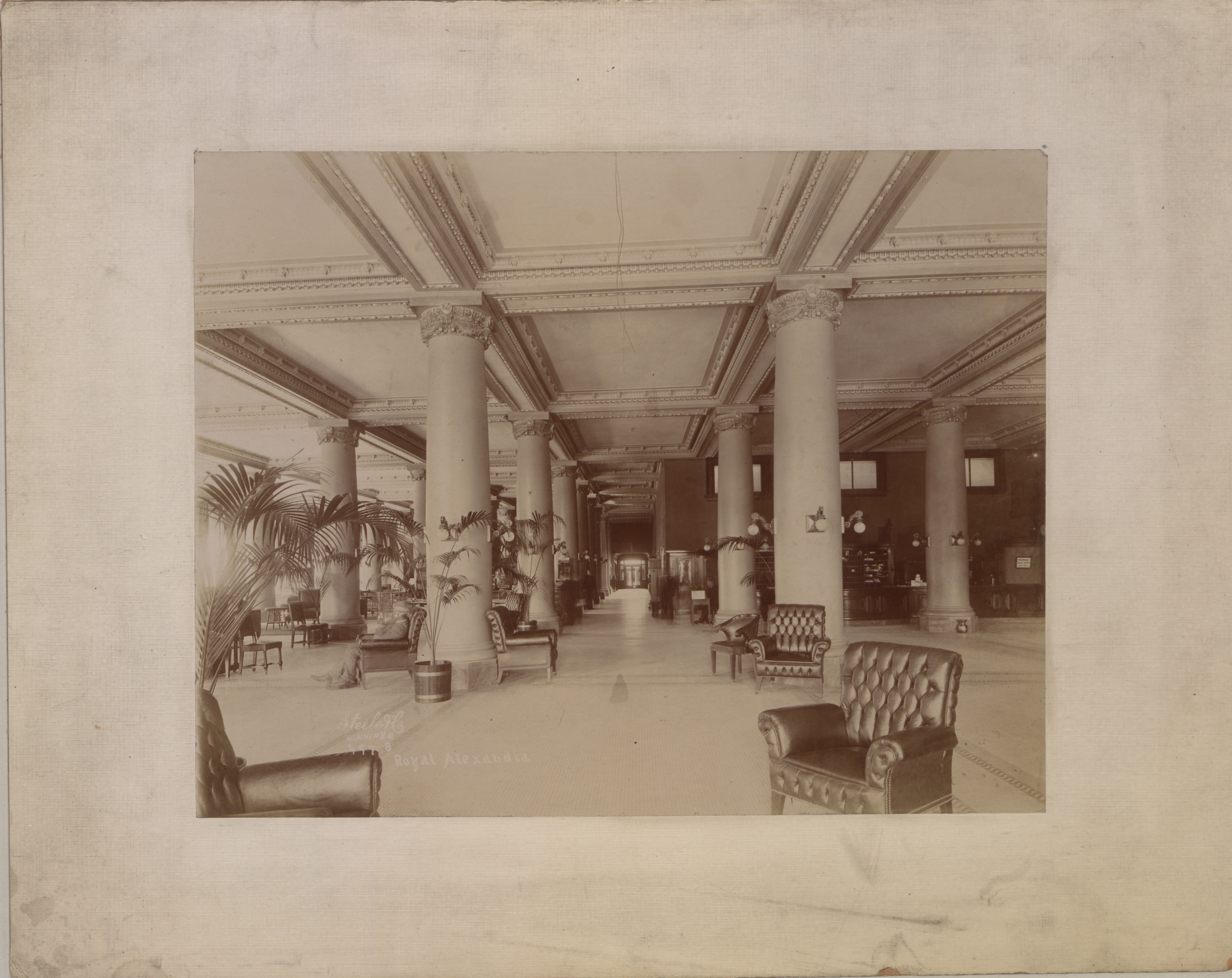
Royal Alexandra Hotel rotunda

James Alexander Coleman was born on January 30, 1911, in Winnipeg, Manitoba. His parents were Irish Canadians. He grew up without his mother Anna Coleman, who died in 1920. His father D'Alton Corry Coleman, who was a former journalist and later president of the Canadian Pacific Railway (CPR), introduced Coleman to sports while travelling about North America as a youth.

Coleman's first experience with horse racing was a visit to Minoru Racetrack in Brighouse with his aunt. She placed C$2 wager on Mineral Jim, a horse he chose which finished in third place. His first baseball game was at Comiskey Park, where according to Coleman, "My father took me and we sat with Mr. Comiskey himself".

Coleman and his brother travelled about Canada and the United States in the care of a train conductor or CPR official, and met their father often with a limousine to attend sporting events. As a youth he witnessed the Victoria Cougars win the final game of the 1925 Stanley Cup Finals, and watched Babe Ruth and Lou Gehrig play at spring training in Florida and in the World Series.

Coleman grew up living in hotel suites from Vancouver to Montreal, and spent eight years at the Royal Alexandra Hotel in Winnipeg from 1922 to 1930. He received his first typewriter at age 13 from his father, and was educated at Victoria College, British Columbia and then at McGill University. Before turning to journalism, he wanted to become a doctor but his application for medical school was declined.

== Career ==
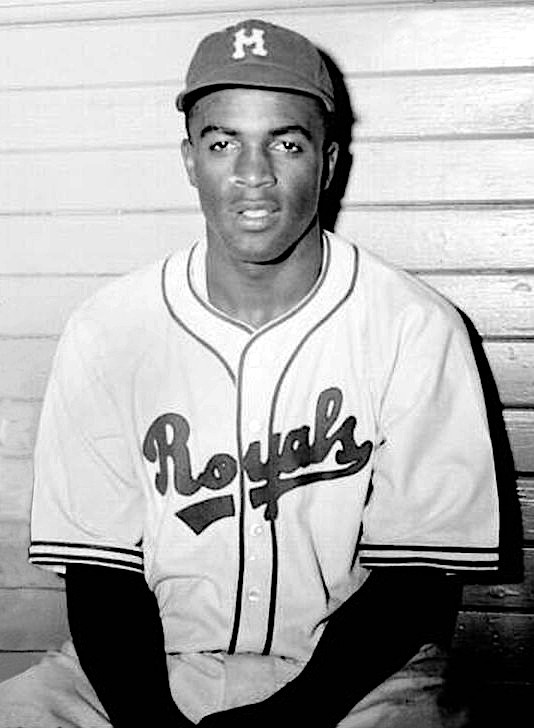
Jackie Robinson with the Montreal Royals in 1946

Coleman began his journalism career with The Winnipeg Tribune in 1931. He subsequently worked for The Brandon Sun, The Vancouver Province, the Edmonton Journal, the Edmonton Bulletin and then began with The Globe and Mail in 1941.

One of Coleman's early assignments included reporting on the demonstration sport of curling at the 1932 Winter Olympics held in Lake Placid, New York. He also spent time as a law enforcement reporter with The Winnipeg Tribune then as a resident correspondent in Brandon, Manitoba. According to Coleman, his time in Brandon "saddened me a bit".

Coleman interviewed former world heavyweight champion boxer Jack Johnson in 1943, who was then 65 years old and the main attraction at a freak show in a travelling circus. The interview recalled Johnson's victory over James J. Jeffries in 1908, which led to the Johnson–Jeffries riots, and how Johnson was hated for eight years as champion because he was a "Black American".

Coleman interviewed Jackie Robinson as a member of the Montreal Royals, a year before Robinson broke the baseball colour barrier in 1947.

"Well, he's a big, clean-cut guy with an easy smile and a firm handshake. He has the legs of a hard-driving football player and the shoulders of a wrestler' and he possesses a calm detachment that belies the fact that he is an earnest and incisive thinker. From the cut of his jib, it is obvious that Robinson is a big-leaguer".

— Jim Coleman, August 30, 1946

Coleman resigned his position with The Globe and Mail in January 1950. He felt that despite having "freedom of expression", he spent "every waking minute seeking a subject about which to write", and that "writing a daily column is a job that ends only once". He subsequently worked for The Canadian Press and Southam Newspapers, and became Canada's first national print syndication sports columnist in 1950. Coleman later had a weekend radio sports commentary show on CFRB, and hosted The Jim Coleman Show from September 1959 to June 1960, on CBC Television as a weekly sports report.

=== Horse racing ===
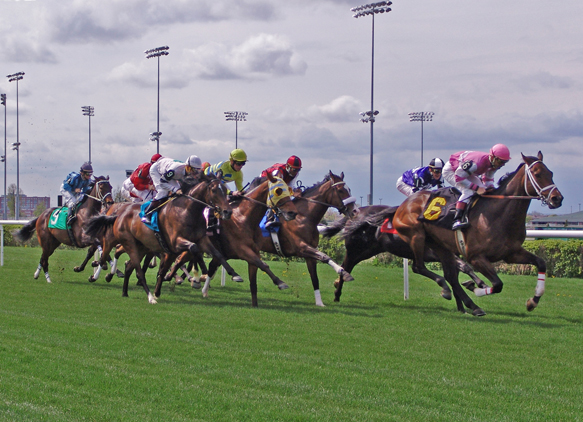
Horse racing at Woodbine Racetrack

Coleman had a lifelong love for horse racing. In his early years, he criticized the Ontario Jockey Club which did not allow entrants into the King's Plate from Quebec or Western Canada until 1944. He regularly published columns about people involved in horse racing in Canada.

"You find strange people around a racetrack. Good men, bad men and men that are just plain shiftless and lazy. The best thing about racing is the horses: honest, loyal and uncomplaining. Sometimes it's not wise to ask too many questions around a racetrack because the yesterdays are nobody's business and it's only an even-money bet that the sun will rise again tomorrow morning".

— Jim Coleman, March 14, 1946

Coleman entered his own horse, Leonforte, into the King's Plate in 1947, and wrote columns of his experiences as an owner in horse racing.

Coleman began working at Thorncliffe Park Raceway in 1950, until E. P. Taylor consolidated horse raceways in 1952. Coleman then served as press secretary of the Ontario Jockey Club from 1952 to 1962. He also spent time serving with the Ontario Racing Commission.

In 1964, Coleman referred to Northern Dancer as the greatest Canadian horse ever bred, and wrote the horse's biography published in Maclean's.

Coleman published the autobiography, A Hoofprint on My Heart (1971), which summarized his passion for horse racing, and "told the story of a little boy who always wanted to own a race horse".

Coleman wrote that while going to report on the 1974 Kentucky Derby, he had a mission to protect fellow journalist Milt Dunnell of the Toronto Star from pickpocketing. Coleman stated that Dunnell had his pocket picked multiple times without his "personal protection", but was not robbed when he would walk two paces behind Dunnell, who preferred to carry his wallet in his right hip pocket.

=== Canadian football ===
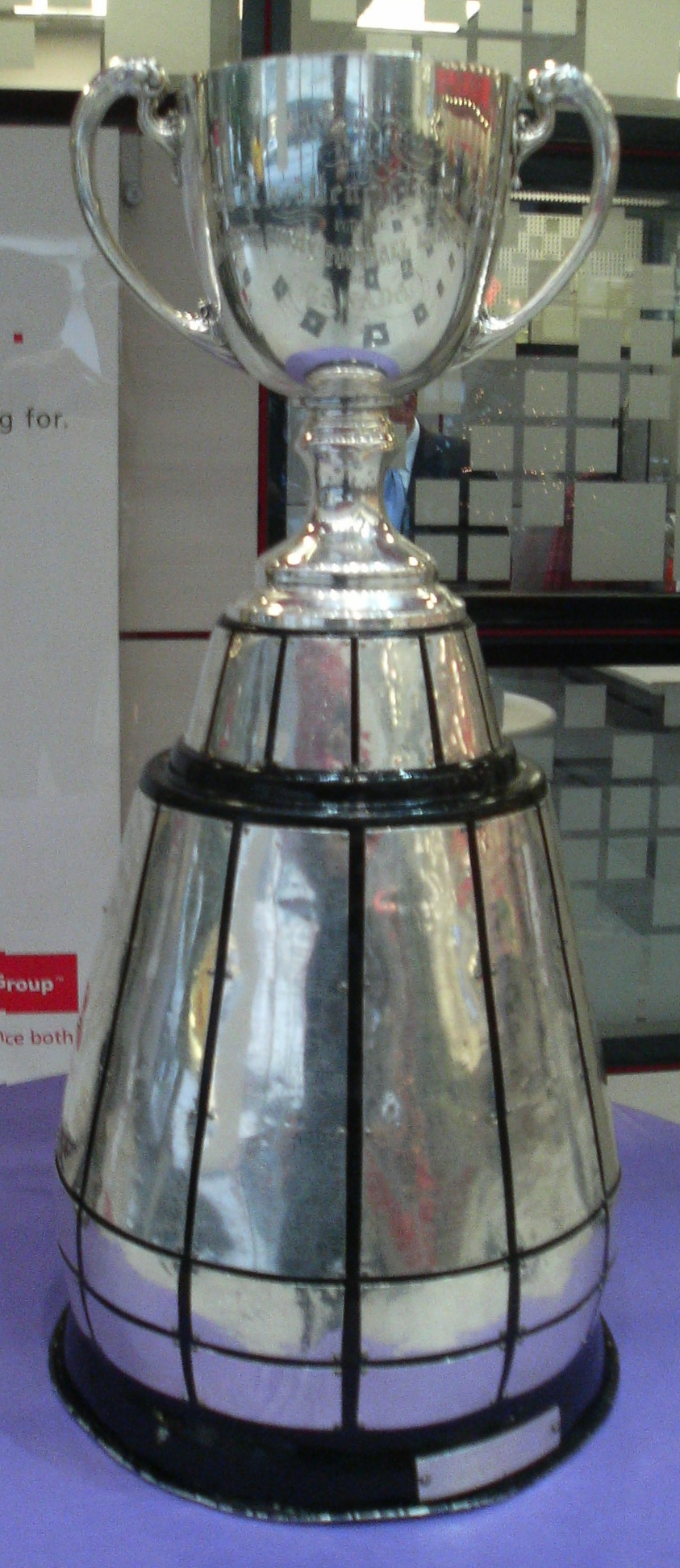
Grey Cup trophy

Coleman regularly reported on Canadian football. His first Grey Cup coverage was completed as a freelancer for The Winnipeg Tribune. He was in attendance at the 17th Grey Cup in 1929, when the first forward pass was thrown in the championship game, by centreman Jersey Campbell. He later attended the 20th Grey Cup in 1932, where Warren Stephens threw the first touchdown pass in a Grey Cup game. In 1941, Coleman was a co-founder of the Vancouver Grizzlies team that played in the Western Interprovincial Football Union.

The summary of the celebration by Calgary Stampeders supporters at the Royal York Hotel after their team won the 36th Grey Cup in Toronto, was noted by fellow journalist Jim Taylor as one of Coleman's finest columns.

"The football game for the Grey Cup was contested officially in the stadium and was continued unofficially in the hotel lobby. At 5:01 p.m. the goalposts were borne triumphantly through the front doors and were erected against the railings of the mezzanine. At 5:02 p.m. two platoons of bellboys circumspectly removed the potted palms, flower vases and anything that weighed less than three thousand pounds. The gaudily caparisoned Calgary supporters were boisterous and noisy but well-behaved and courteously declined to ride their horses into the elevators. Any minor untoward incidents were occasioned by youthful local yahoos who suffered from the delusion that the consumption of two pints of ale and the acquisition of a pseudo-western twang entitled them to ride the range astride any convenient chesterfield".

— Jim Coleman, November 28, 1948

Coleman was later a regular guest on radio half-time shows for Hamilton Tiger-Cats games, where he was introduced by the local colour commentator as the "Southam communist".

=== Ice hockey ===
Coleman regularly interviewed ice hockey players on train trips between National Hockey League games during the Original Six era, and often shared drinks with them. He was a regular member of the radio version of hot stove league for NHL games. He invented the Curse of Muldoon in 1943, and admitted to have made it up at a publishing deadline. The Chicago Black Hawks were supposedly "cursed to hoodoo until the end of time" by former head coach Pete Muldoon when he was terminated in 1927. The curse meant the team would not finish the season in first place, and did not do so until 1967.

Coleman reported on the 1972 Summit Series, and was in attendance during the victory in the eighth game to win the series for Canada. While at a hotel in Moscow after the final game, Jim Taylor reported that, "Jim [Coleman] had been told the room would be bugged. He climbed up very carefully on his bed, leaned into a sprinkler head and screamed, How do you like them apples, Ivan"? When Gordie Howe contemplated a return to hockey at age 45 with the World Hockey Association, Coleman though it "provides a glaring illustration of the sad fact that the quality of professional hockey has been diluted beyond recognition".

Later in his career, Coleman covered Vancouver Canucks games. He was reported to prefer interviewing veteran players, and was quoted as saying to fellow journalists, "Don't fall in love with the flashy rookie at camp".

=== Later work ===
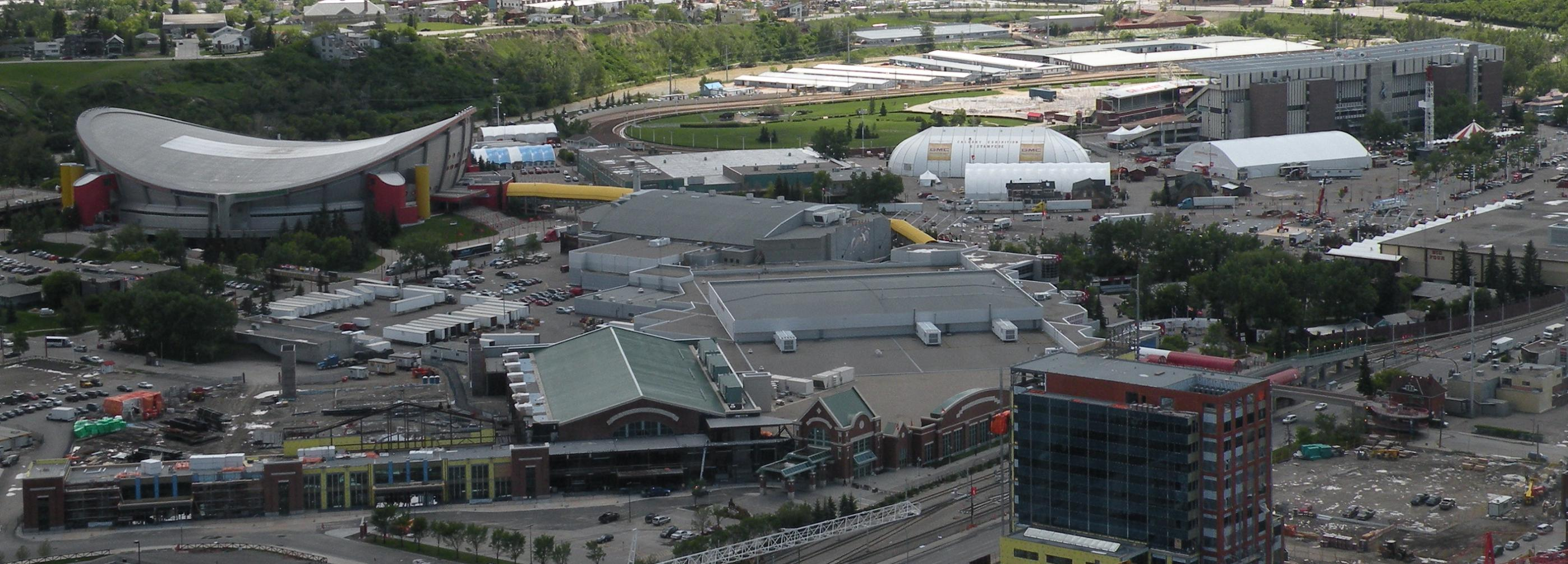
Stampede Park as seen from the Calgary Tower

Coleman retired from Southam Press in 1983, then served as the press secretary for Stampede Park in Calgary for three years starting in 1984.

Coleman subsequently wrote three more books. Hockey Is Our Game (1987) was a reflection his 50-year career in hockey. Long Ride On A Hobby Horse (1990) were his memoirs from a career in sports journalism. Legends of Hockey: The Official Book of the Hockey Hall of Fame (1996) was a series of short biographies to accompany a pictorial essay.

In retirement, Coleman wrote a weekly opinion column and compiled a nostalgia column called "Memory Lane" for The Province. His final column published on the day he died. With the advent of computers, Coleman preferred to continue on a typewriter until the end. He was referred to as an "elder statesman" by colleagues at The Province, who would regularly gather around him in the cafeteria for advice and to listen to stories. He had proclaimed himself the "vice-president in charge of ancient history" at The Province.

== Personal life ==
Coleman went through alcoholism until becoming sober in the late 1950s. He wrote that, "I lived two lives. One the newspaperman who drank too much but who usually managed to complete his work; the other the escapist who spent much of his time in a dream world populated by horses, horsemen, gamblers, bookmakers, touts, stock hustlers and oddball sports promoters". He quit drinking after an epiphany when he answered his telephone that continued to ring from his driveway, where he had thrown it the night before. He was open about his experiences and endeavoured to support others who battled their own demons.

Coleman's father died in 1956. Coleman's uncle Ephraim Herbert Coleman died in 1961, and had served as the under Secretary of State for Canada, and later as the Canadian ambassador to Cuba, then Brazil.

Coleman was married to Maggie Coleman. He lived and worked in Toronto for more than 40 years, before they retired to Vancouver. He died on January 14, 2001, in Vancouver due to heart failure. He had been hospitalized for surgery on January 4 to repair a broken hip from a fall when getting into a taxi at his home on Granville Island. He previously had heart surgery in 1985. In his last conversation with his son, Coleman asked for his typewriter to be brought to the hospital to continue writing.

== Honours ==
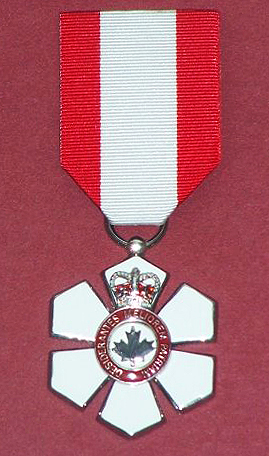
Medal of the Order of Canada

Coleman was made a member of the Order of Canada on December 18, 1974, in recognition for "service as a sports columnist and broadcaster". The formal ceremony was hosted by the Governor General of Canada on April 16, 1975. When Coleman was named to the Order of Canada he hid the invitation from his wife, who later forced him to go receive the honour. He had previously hidden an invitation to have tea with Queen Elizabeth II, which his wife did not find until too late.

Coleman was inducted into both the Canadian News Hall of Fame, and the Canadian Football Hall of Fame as a reporter in 1980. In 1984, he was inducted into the Canadian Horse Racing Hall of Fame in the builder category, and received the Elmer Ferguson Memorial Award from the Hockey Hall of Fame for his journalism in hockey. He was inducted into Canada's Sports Hall of Fame in the builder category in 1985, and inducted into the media section of the Manitoba Hockey Hall of Fame in 1984. He was named to the honour roll of the Manitoba Sportswriters and Sportscasters Association in 2008.

== Legacy ==
The Canadian Press described Coleman as a "legendary sports columnist" and "known for his colourful writing, encyclopedic memory, dapper dress and ever-present cigar". Milt Dunnell felt that, "In my estimation, he was one of the finest sports writers in North America". James Travers of the Toronto Star noted that Coleman's columns were about the people involved in the games instead of the games themselves, and described his writing as "evocative, touching, funny, fast, clean and professional".

Coleman never used computers. The Underwood typewriter which he wrote on until he died was placed on display at the BC Sports Hall of Fame. Jim Taylor published the book, The Best of Jim Coleman: Fifty Years of Canadian Sport from The Man Who Saw It All in 2005. Taylor found all of Coleman's 2,500 columns stuffed into fourteen flower boxes inside of a filing cabinet, read every one then selected 150 columns from 1939 to 1986 for the book.

== Bibliography ==
- Taylor, Jim (2005). The best of Jim Coleman: Fifty years of Canadian sport from the man who saw it all. Madeira Park, British Columbia: Harbour Publishing. ISBN 978-1-55017-359-8.
