= The Jim Coleman Show =

- Genre: Sports news
- Country of origin: Canada
- Original language: English
- No. of seasons: 1

Production
- Producer: Ty Lemburg
- Running time: 15 minutes

Original release
- Network: CBC Television
- Release: 4 September 1959 – 24 June 1960

The Jim Coleman Show is a Canadian sports news television program that aired on CBC Television from 1959 to 1960. It was hosted by sports journalist Jim Coleman.

== Premise ==
Jim Coleman was a Toronto sports journalist who hosted this series of sports journalism, featuring interviews with prominent sportspeople with sports news items. The programme appeared after a boxing broadcast.

== Scheduling ==
This 15-minute series was broadcast Fridays at 10:45 p.m. from 4 September 1959 to 24 June 1960.
