= David Kestenbaum =

American radio producer (born 1969)

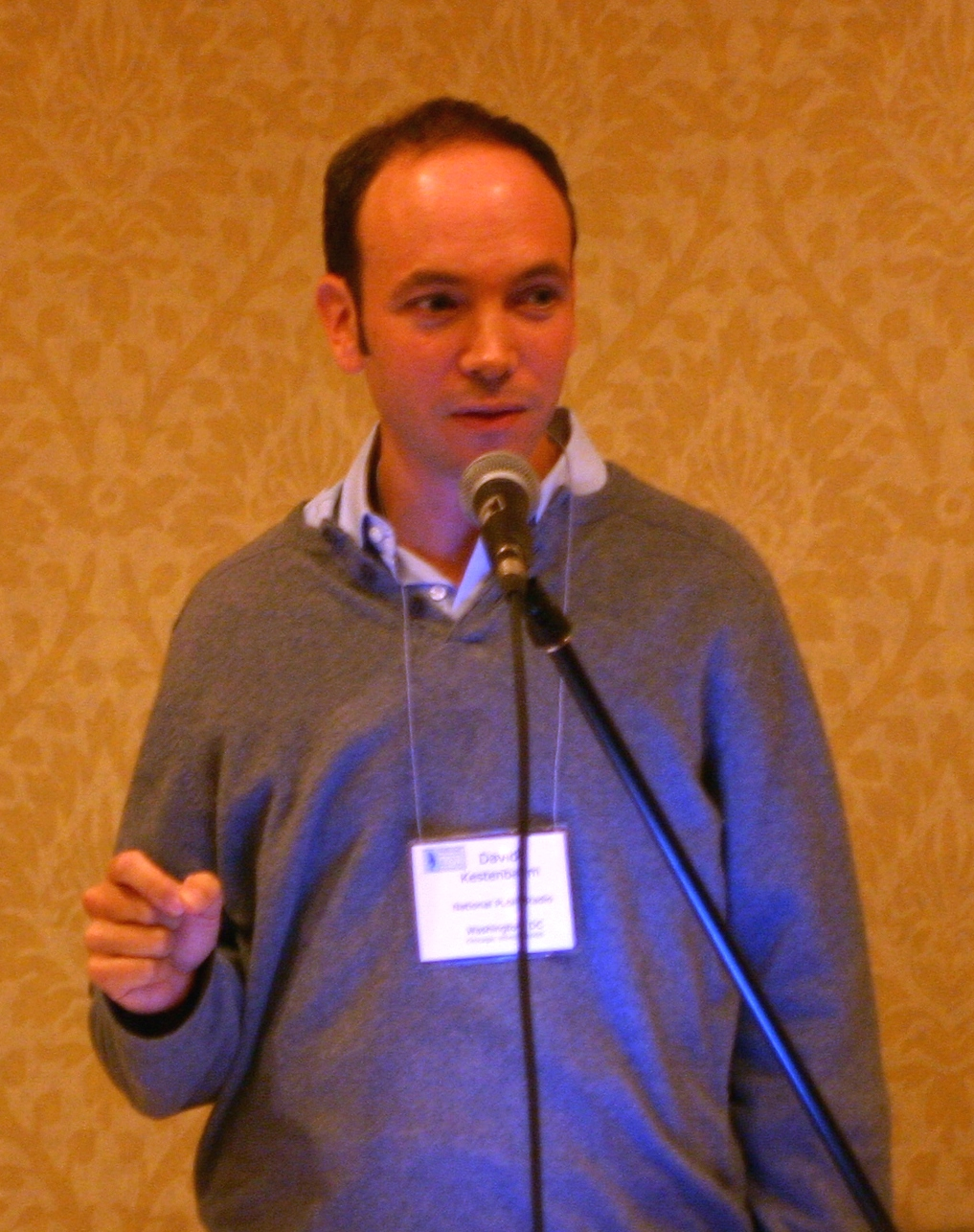
- Kestenbaum speaking at Third Coast International Audio Festival in 2005
- Born: David Samuel Kestenbaum; 1969 (age 56–57); Providence, Rhode Island, U.S.
- Presenting career
- Show: This American Life
- Country: United States
- Previous show: Planet Money

David Samuel Kestenbaum (born 1969) is an American radio producer for This American Life. He was formerly a producer for Planet Money and a correspondent for National Public Radio. He generally covers science and economic issues.

Kestenbaum earned a Ph.D. in physics from Harvard University in 1996 with the thesis Observation of Top Quark Anti-Top Quark Production Using a Soft Lepton B Tag in Proton Anti-Proton Collisions at 1.8 TeV working under the supervision of Melissa Franklin. In 1997, Kestenbaum was selected as a AAAS Mass Media Fellow, working at a NPR affiliate radio station in Columbus, Ohio.
