= Mackenzie Community School =

Coordinates: 46.1046°N 77.4889°W

Location
- 87 Brockhouse Way; Deep River, Ontario

Information
- School type: Public school
- Established: 1952, as Mackenzie High School
- Status: Open
- School district: Renfrew County District School Board
- Principal: Cathy Kyte
- Grades: K–12
- Language: English
- Area: Suburban
- Colors: Purple and Gold
- Mascot: Mustangs

Mackenzie Community School is a public K–12 school in Deep River, Ontario. It is a very small school with a student body of approximately 600 as of 2018. Its colours are purple and gold, and their sport teams' name is The Mustangs. The school's motto is Together We Inspire Learning.

== History ==
The building in which Mackenzie Community School is housed was originally named C. J. Mackenzie High School, named in honour of Chalmers Jack Mackenzie, a civil engineer educated at Dalhousie and Harvard.

Due to declining enrollment, in 2011 T. W. Morison Public School, Keys Public School, and C. J. Mackenzie High School were amalgamated into Mackenzie Community School.

== Academics ==
=== High school ===
As it is such a small school, there are a limited number of available courses for high school students, and next to no specialty courses. Courses have three possible level classifications: academic/university, applied/college, and locally developed, in some courses. Mathematics, English, and French classes are well-attended and produce good results and grades from most students.

Mackenzie Community School offers a small variety of courses for students to take as electives. In the arts, there are visual/native arts, instrumental music, and drama. Within the technology sector, there are classes like the general technologies, including woodworking, metalworking, and graphic design; Auto shop, which includes repairing and assembling vehicles; and design technology, which includes designing and building models of houses and other buildings.

High school students also have other opportunities of academic courses and activities. One of these is cooperative education. This provides a way for students to gain credits in a real-world work experience. They may be take in single period (one credit), half day (two credits), and full day (four credits). Another program is Specialist High Skills Majors (SHSM), a program where student can earn a certification on their diploma to show they have gained certain skills for the work sector they are going into. Lastly, for students going into the trades, the Ontario Youth Apprenticeship Program (OYAP) is available for students to gain work experience to go toward their trade certifications.

=== Elementary school ===
Within the elementary section of the school, there are students from kindergarten to grade 8. All students in these grades take classes in Math, French, and physical education. Due to the low enrollment numbers, many of the grade classes are what is called a 'split class,' in which one teacher has a class of two consecutive grades because there either were not enough students to make a full class of one grade, or too many too fit into one.

To further the learning of French, the school offers a part-day French immersion program for grades 5 to 8. Students in this program go to a separate classroom for around an hour and a half where they learn the same subjects they would otherwise, like History, Geography, Art, and Drama, just using the French Language. This course also counts toward the mandatory Core French grade.

== Sports ==
=== High school ===
==== Fall Sports ====
Cross Country Running

Boys' Volleyball

Girls' Basketball

Girls' Rugby

Ultimate Frisbee

~~Boys' Football~~

==== Winter Sports ====
Girls' Volleyball

Boys' Basketball

Alpine Skiing and Snowboarding

Nordic Skiing

Curling

==== Spring Sports ====
Badminton

Track and Field

Boys' Soccer

Girls' Soccer

Tennis

Softball

=== Elementary school ===
Depending on available faculty and staff to supervise, the following sports are available to elementary students: Cross Country Running, Volleyball, Basketball, Badminton, Soccer, Track and Field, and Softball.
