= Royal Alexandra Hotel =

Hotel in Winnipeg (1906–1967)

Coordinates: 49.904585°N 97.133700°W

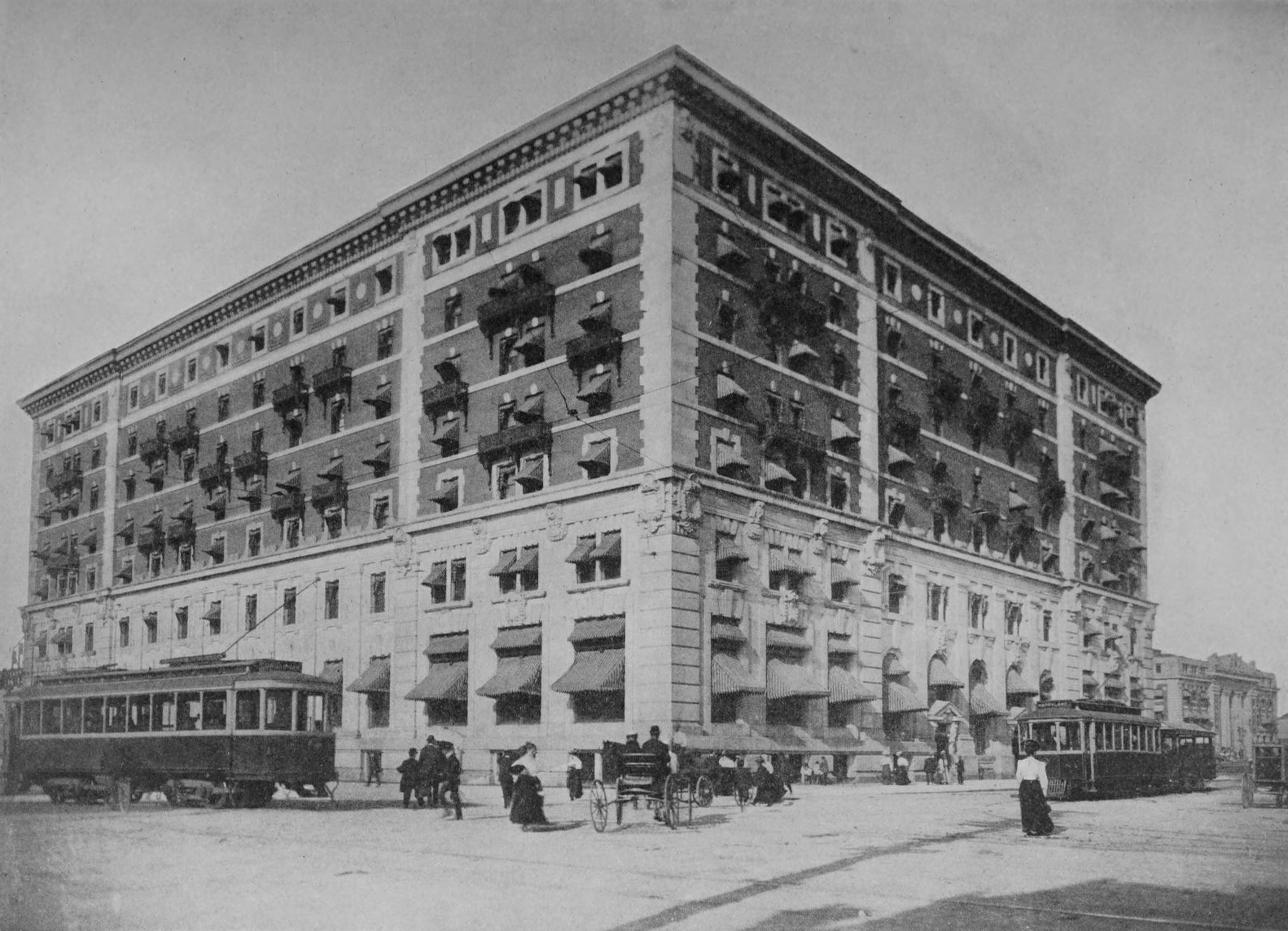

General information
- Location: 183 Higgins Avenue; Winnipeg, Manitoba
- Opened: 19 July 1906
- Closed: 31 December 1967
- Demolished: 1971

Design and construction
- Architects: Edward Maxwell & William Sutherland Maxwell

The Royal Alexandra Hotel was a hotel in Winnipeg, Manitoba, that operated from 1906 to 1967. Named for Alexandra of Denmark, the hotel was built and run by the Canadian Pacific Railway, and was designed by Edward Maxwell and William Sutherland Maxwell of Montreal. The Royal Alexandra was part of a unified development that also housed a Winnipeg train station and an office wing. The hotel operated for 61 years and closed at the end of 1967. It then sat vacant for four years before being demolished in 1971.

== History ==
The Canadian Pacific began plans for a major hotel in Winnipeg in 1899. That year, president Thomas Shaughnessy unveiled plans for a combined station and hotel that was similar in concept to Place Viger in Montreal. The building was designed by Edward Maxwell and was drawn by David MacFarlane (later of Ross and MacFarlane), who was working in Maxwell's office at the time. The massing of the structure may have influenced MacFarlane's subsequent design of the Hotel Macdonald in Edmonton. Maxwell preferred the building to be constructed of white stone and white brick, while company officials favoured red sandstone and Lac du Bonnet brick. The CPR's inability to acquire all the land necessary for the project prevented it from going forward.

In October 1903, the Canadian Pacific Railway's board approved a new development in Winnipeg that would include a station, offices, and a hotel. Plans for the project were completed in 1904 by the railway's preferred architects, E. & W. S. Maxwell of Montreal. The complex was designed in the Beaux-Arts style and employed Wisconsin red brick and Manitoba Tyndall Stone. Construction of the station began in 1904. When the new station was completed, the previous station was demolished and the hotel was built on its site. Steelwork was provided by the Dominion Bridge Company. The hotel, which stood at seven storeys, was completed in June 1906 and opened on 19 July of that year. Originally, the hotel had over 300 rooms. From 1909 to 1910, Frederick Challener was commissioned to paint eight murals in the hotel's dining room. The murals depicted scenes of western life. After the hotel's demolition, four were saved and kept by the Archives of Manitoba. Montreal artist Henri Beau painted a vineyard mural for the hotel's café.

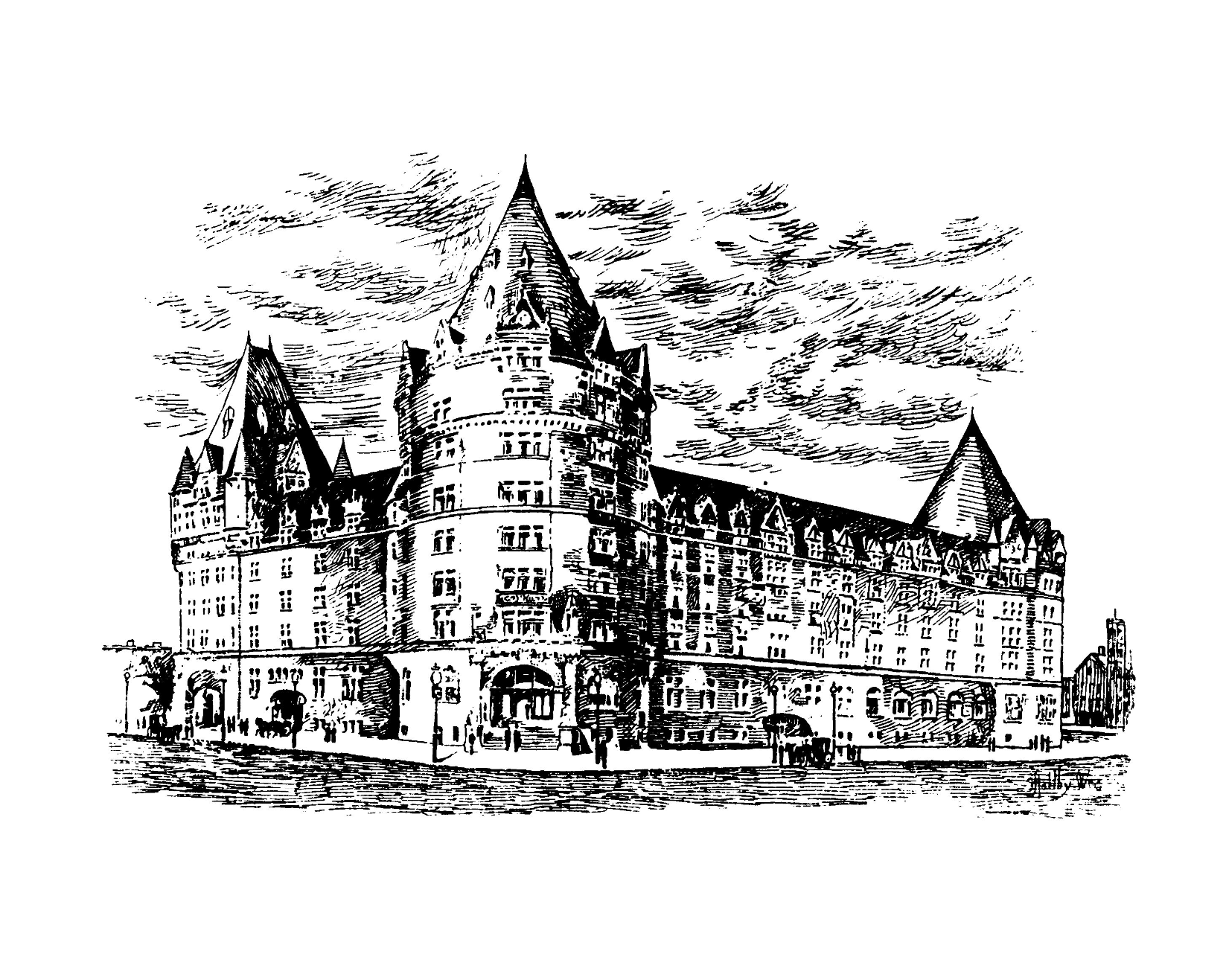
Maxwell's unbuilt 1899 design

In 1910, the railway's president, Thomas Shaughnessy, decided to expand the Alexandra. However, the existing structure did not include provisions for additional floors. The Maxwells designed an addition on the east side of the building that included 184 bedrooms, a ballroom, and a banquet hall. The addition was completed in 1913.

The Royal Alexandra was, along with the Fort Garry Hotel, one of two railway hotels in Winnipeg. The Alexandra was regarded as the inferior of the two. In her memoir Raisins and Almonds, Fredelle Bruser Maynard wrote, "the boundary of the business district here was the Royal Alexandra Hotel, a poor relation of the Fort Garry to the south. (The relationship between the two hotels was roughly that of Eaton's to the Bay, North End to South, immigrant to Old Settler.)"

Journalist Jim Coleman spent eight years of his youth living in a suite at the hotel from 1922 to 1930. The Canadian Amateur Hockey Association hosted its silver jubilee at the hotel in 1939.

At the end of 1967, the Royal Alexandra Hotel closed. It sat vacant for several years before being dismantled in 1971 and 1972. During the dismantling, the Oak Room, one of the restaurants, was taken apart and stored in a semi-trailer by Donni and Allan Stern. In 2001, the room was reassembled at the Cranbrook History Centre.

== See also ==
- Grand railway hotels of Canada
