= Renfrew Collegiate Institute =

Secondary school in Ontario, Canada

Coordinates: 45.47034°N 76.68688°W

Renfrew Collegiate Institute (RCI) is a secondary school in the town of Renfrew, Ontario, and is part of the Renfrew County District School Board. Located at 184 Bonnechere Street, South Renfrew Collegiate Institute is one of two high schools in Renfrew. In 2015, Renfrew Collegiate Institute ranked 558 in Ontario Secondary Schools, according to Fraser Institute. Feeder schools include Queen Elizabeth Public School, Central Public School, and Admaston Township Public School.

== History ==
In January, 1881, the first classes were held at the Renfrew High School. Mr. Charles McDowell was the first principal. Enrolment grew rapidly and an enlarged building was opened on the same site in January 1896. In 1902, Renfrew High School applied for and received "Collegiate" status after having fulfilled numerous requirements. Renfrew High School thus became Renfrew Collegiate in 1902. A gym was added to Renfrew Collegiate in 1911.

The original building that housed Renfrew Collegiate was eventually condemned due to sagging joists, inadequate ventilation and insufficient lighting. Students were housed in the Armouries for two years while the new school was being constructed. In 1923, a new, three story building was completed, consisting of 19 classrooms, a library, three science labs and an auditorium with a gymnasium underneath. In 1924, there were 390 students enrolled and 13 staff were employed at Renfrew Collegiate. The shop wing (formerly the gym which was constructed in 1911) was destroyed by fire in 1958. This wing was immediately replaced with a two-story wing containing five classrooms and a staff room.

The "Baby Boom" and society's increased insistence that students remain in school until graduation resulted in a sharp increase in enrolment and therefore demand for educational facilities in the 1960s. A renovation in 1963, costing over $1,000,000, resulted in the creation of a new Technical Education wing and a new double gymnasium called the Grant Gymnasium, along with some modernization of the 1922 building. The old gym was also converted into a much needed cafeteria. In 1966 the school expanded yet again, adding 13 classrooms and a second gym called the MacNeil Gymnasium with a greenhouse on top. Stewart Field was also acquired in 1969, thanks in part to a bequest from the estate of Mrs. D. W. Stewart. The student population in 1970 was just under 1300 students. The staff totalled 81. In 1971, a new entrance and library was added to Renfrew Collegiate.

== Extracurricular activities ==
As of 2018, Renfrew Collegiate Institute offers a wide variety of extracurricular activities. A part of the Upper Ottawa Valley High School Athletic Association, The Renfrew Collegiate Institute Raiders has teams competing in Alpine Skiing and Snowboarding, Badminton, Basketball, Cross Country, Football, Golf, Hockey, Nordic Skiing, Soccer, Tennis, Track and Field, Volleyball, and Wrestling. Renfrew Collegiate also offers a variety of clubs including: Art Club, Band, Computer, Chess, Drama, Interact, Yearbook, Pride, Dungeons and Dragons, Choir and Bluezone Student Council.

In the 2024–2025 school year, Renfrew Collegiate had no football program due to lack of interest.

== Departments ==
Renfrew Collegiate Institute offers courses in the Arts, Business, Canadian and World studies, Computer studies, English, French as a Second Language, Guidance and Career Education, Health and Physical Education, Interdisciplinary studies, Mathematics, Native studies, Science, Social Science and Humanities, and Technological education.

== Transportation ==
Renfrew Collegiate Institute is partnered with Renfrew County Joint Transportation Consortium to provide a safe, cost effective and timely mode of transportation.

== Renfrew Collegiate Intermediate School ==
Renfrew Collegiate underwent changes in 2010 to accommodate the inclusion of grades 7 and 8 due to overcrowding of the feeder schools. Renfrew Collegiate Intermediate School, or RCIS, is both a part of RCI and a separate school. It is an Intermediate school rather than a secondary school and has a different school schedule as well as stricter rules and policies for the students. RCIS has classrooms in one wing of both the first and second floors. The students use the same cafeteria and are allowed to participate in many of the RCI clubs. The students also take Tech classes in the high school Tech Wing. The MacNeil Gym is used mainly for RCIS's purposes. RCIS offers a 50% French Immersion Program. Subjects taught in French are: French Language, History, Geography, Health, Physical Education and some Visual Arts, Drama and Dance. Subjects taught in English are: English Language, Mathematics, Science, Exploring Technologies, Music and some Visual Arts, Drama and Dance. Most of the clubs and sports available for students at RCI are also available at the Intermediate level.

== Program and Services ==
=== Coop and Ontario Youth Apprenticeship Program ===
OYAP is an enhanced co-op program which allows students to start to learn a skilled trade (through apprenticeship) while at the same time completing the requirements (through co-op credits) for Ontario Secondary School graduation.

=== ELearning ===
Renfrew Collegiate Institute offers a variety of ELearning courses for their students to complete.

=== French Immersion ===
French language courses are offered at three levels: Extended, Academic and Applied. Social Science courses are offered in French as part of the Extended French Program and Core French students interested in increasing their language proficiency are encouraged to select these courses as well. The Grade 12 Interdisciplinary course called "La francophonie" is open to Core and Extended students interested in studying the role of French language and culture around the world.

=== High Skills Major ===
Specialist High Skills Majors (SHSM) are opportunities available at Renfrew Collegiate Institute for students with an interest in a particular sector. They can "major" in that sector while they are still in high school to receive an enhanced diploma and transcript.

All four destinations (apprenticeship, college, university and workplace) are available within each SHSM. The sectors/majors offered at Renfrew Collegiate Institute (RCI) are Construction, Energy, Health and Wellness, Justice, Community Safety and Emergency Services, Non-Profit, and Transportation.

=== Special Education Service ===
The Special Education Department offers academic support plus a variety of learning experiences for students who have been identified as exceptional. The teacher(s) in this department provide resource help and liaison with subject teachers and counselling services to ensure that these students have the opportunity to reach their potential. Recommended interventions, accommodations and/or modifications for every identified student are communicated to all interested parties through the Individual Education Plan (IEP).

=== Student Success ===
Working in partnership with the Ontario Ministry of Education, the Student Success program aims to improve the learning experience for Grade 7 to 12 students, and especially those who are struggling, who need extra attention to help them graduate or who are looking for new challenges in high school.

== Notable alumni ==
- Silver Quilty

== See also ==
- Education in Ontario
- List of secondary schools in Ontario
