= Deep River, Ontario =

Deep River
- Town (lower-tier)
- Deep River in 2026
- Nickname: Canada's Nuclear Pioneers
- Location within Renfrew County Location within Southern Ontario
- Coordinates: 46°06′N 77°29.5′W
- Country: Canada
- Province: Ontario
- County: Renfrew
- Founded: 1944
- Incorporated: 1959

Government
  - Mayor: Suzanne D'Eon
  - Federal riding: Algonquin—Renfrew—Pembroke
  - Prov. riding: Renfrew—Nipissing—Pembroke

Area
  - Land: 50.27 km^{2} (19.41 sq mi)

Population (2021)
  - Total: 4,175
  - Density: 832/km^{2} (2,150/sq mi)
- Time zone: UTC-5 (Eastern Standard Time (EST))
  - Summer (DST): UTC-4 (Eastern Daylight Time (EDT))
- Postal code: K0J 1P0
- Area code: 613
- Website: www.deepriver.ca

Deep River is a town in Renfrew County, Ontario, Canada. Located along the Ottawa River, it lies about 200 kilometres (120 mi) north-west of Ottawa on the Trans-Canada Highway. Deep River is opposite the Laurentian Mountains and the Province of Quebec.

The name "Deep River" purportedly derives from the notion that the Ottawa River reaches its greatest depth of 402 feet (123 m) just outside the township. Although this is not official, the Ottawa River reaches a depth of 565 feet (172 m) in Moose Bay, which is located on the Holden Lake reservoir from the Des Joachim dam, west of Deux-Rivières.

The primary industry centres on research at the Chalk River location of Canadian Nuclear Laboratories (CNL), a facility of the Chalk River Laboratories about 10 km east of Deep River on Highway 17. The facility is named for and primarily accessed via the nearby town of Chalk River although the site is technically in Deep River.

== History ==
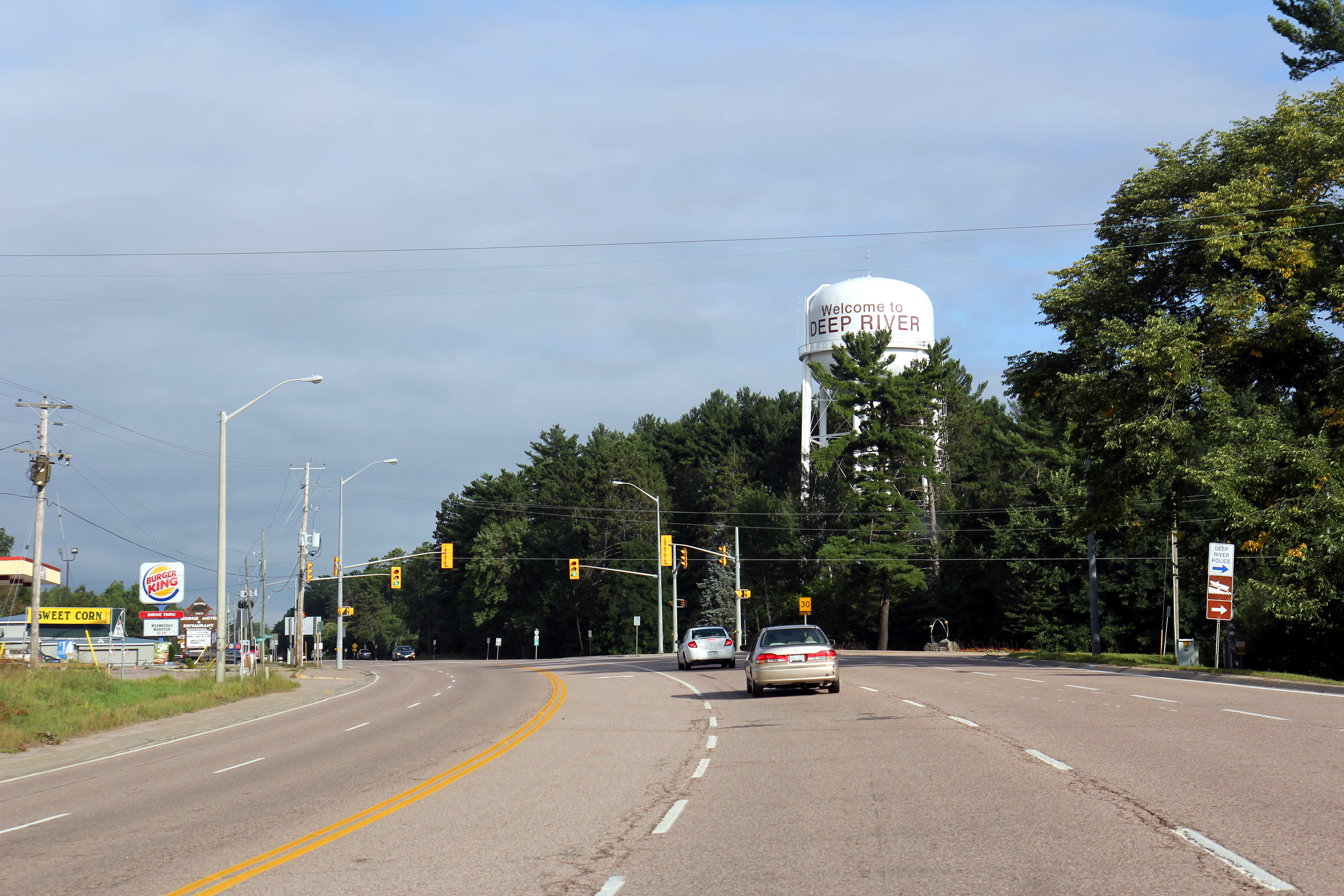
The Trans-Canada Highway in Deep River

Plans for the construction of this planned community began in 1944 by the federal government as part of the Manhattan Project, to accommodate employees of the nearby Chalk River Nuclear Laboratories (CRNL). Along with Los Alamos, New Mexico, and Oak Ridge, Tennessee, Chalk River was an offshoot of the nuclear effort for the allies and scientists, engineers, and tradesmen from around the world who came to work on the Manhattan Project. After World War II, Canada continued on with research into the atom, and dedicated the country to the peaceful uses that could be derived from putting the atom to use. Deep River was situated far enough upwind and upriver of the Chalk River research reactors to avoid radioactive fallout.

John Bland, an architecture professor at McGill University, developed the town's first master plan in 1944. Bland located the town between the existing Highway 17 and the Ottawa River. He designed a system of streets that generally followed the contours of the area's topography. Residential neighborhoods stretched out from a commercial and service-sector core. Straight and broad avenues ran along contour lines, and narrower and winding streets lay at right angles to discourage non-local traffic from entering neighborhoods. Parks and schools were located strategically throughout the town. The streets were named after local flora, Canadian politicians and famous scientists such as Ernest Rutherford and Charles Darwin.

At the same time, its economy and development were further boosted by the construction of the Des Joachim Hydroelectric Generating Station and dam on the Ottawa River at Rolphton, which opened on June 28, 1950.

The town was the subject of a Maclean's Magazine article in 1958 by the noted Canadian journalist, editor, and author Peter C. Newman. Entitled, "Deep River: Almost the Perfect Place to Live," the article took a sardonic take on the town as a very odd and isolated place populated by mostly young, male, highly-educated, and bored scientists and technicians struggling to find things to do with their time: "The Utopian town where our atomic scientists live and play has no crime, no slums, no unemployment and few mothers-in-law."

Deep River was incorporated as a town in 1957.

In 1962, the experimental Nuclear Power Demonstration, or NPD power, reactor started up as a prototype for later CANDU reactors. This was operated by Ontario Hydro, which later used it as a training facility for new employees in its nuclear division. That brought many more temporary residents to the town. The NPD was shut down in 1987; the nuclear fuel was removed from the site, along with non-radioactive equipment, leaving in place only the building shell and the nuclear components (reactor, tanks, pipes etc.) that had become radioactive to wait for further decommissioning. The facility has been waiting for final demolition and permanent disposal of the radioactive nuclear components for over 30 years.

== Geography ==
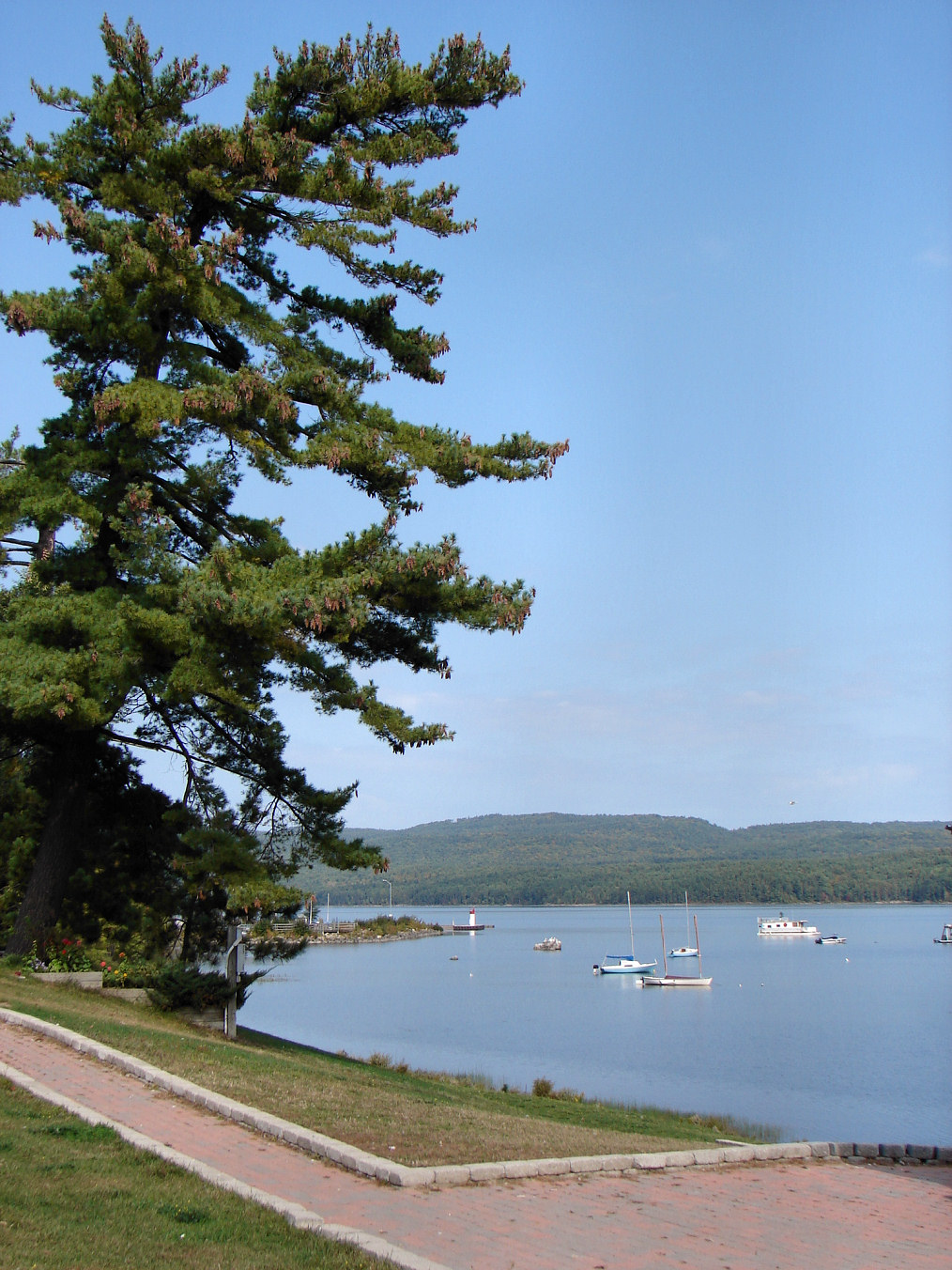
Marina on the Ottawa River.

Deep River is located at a latitude of 46°06' north and longitude 77°30' west, in the Boreal Forest biozone, and has an area of 50.87 square kilometres. The town sits on the section of the Ottawa River referred to as "La Rivière Creuse" (the "Deep River") by 17th-century French explorers, and which later was at the heart of Canada's 19th-century timber trade.

== Demographics ==
In the 2021 Census of Population conducted by Statistics Canada, Deep River had a population of 4,175 living in 1,866 of its 1,981 total private dwellings, a change of 1.6% from its 2016 population of 4,109. With a land area of 50.27 km^{2} (19.41 sq mi), it had a population density of 83.1/km^{2} (215.1/sq mi) in 2021.

Canada census – Deep River community profile

	2021	2016	2011
Population	4,175 (+1.6% from 2016)	4109 (-2.0% from 2011)	4193 (-0.5% from 2006)
Land area	50.27 km^{2} (19.41 sq mi)	50.13 km^{2} (19.36 sq mi)	50.90 km^{2} (19.65 sq mi)
Population density	83.0/km^{2} (215/sq mi)	82.0/km^{2} (212/sq mi)	82.4/km^{2} (213/sq mi)
Median age	47.6 (M: 46.0, F: 49.2)	47.6 (M: 46.6, F: 49.1)
Private dwellings	1,981 (total) 1,866 (occupied)	1,957 (total) 1,823 (occupied)	1933 (total)
Median household income	$95,000	$90,321

References: 2021 2016 2011

Historical census populations – Deep River, Ontario

Year	Pop.	±%
1956	3,669	—
1961	5,377	+46.6%
1966	5,573	+3.6%
1971	5,671	+1.8%
1976	5,565	−1.9%
1981	5,095	−8.4%
1986	4,602	−9.7%

Year	Pop.	±%
1991	4,571	−0.7%
1996	4,491	−1.8%
2001	4,135	−7.9%
2006	4,216	+2.0%
2011	4,193	−0.5%
2016	4,109	−2.0%
2021	4,175	+1.6%

Source: Statistics Canada

Special Note: The 1956 Population of 3,669 is the Population of the Deep River I.D. OR Deep River Improvement District which was created in 1951-1956 after June 1st, 1951, according to Statistics Canada as written up in the 1956 Census Of Canada, CS98, Volume 1, Population, Table 5, Page 33. The 1961 Census Of Canada in its CS92-539, Table 6, Page 113, further clarifies this 1956 claim by saying that the Deep River Improvement District was actually created on April 16, 1956 out of territories once belonging to the Townships of Rolph, Buchanan, Wylie And McKay, and that the 1956 Improvement District then became an Incorporated Town in 1959 as is listed elsewhere here.

== Recreation, arts and culture ==
Deep River boasts many active clubs. Among the numerous community accomplishments is the creation of the Deep River Symphony Orchestra, formed in 1951, making Deep River one of the smallest towns to have a symphony orchestra. The Deep River Choral Group, and Deep River Community Band also host multiple concerts every year. Cross-country skiing is a popular winter recreation. Avid skiers of the Deep River Cross-Country Ski Club created the Silver Spoon trails and an annual race that brings contestants from across Ontario. Another popular event is Summerfest, a festival held once every two years, hosting many local and famous artists including Sloan, Wide Mouth Mason, Amanda Wilkinson, Daniel Lanois, Mobile, and K'naan. The festival also organizes many recreational events, including the Cross-River Swim.

Deep River is generally known to have picturesque scenery, excellent boating along the broad river, and good hiking in the hills across the Ottawa River. Deep River also has a community pool, fire department, police department, ski hill, golf course, curling rink, yacht and tennis club, and library.

Deep River is home to two museums: The Canadian Clock Museum, home to an extensive collection of clocks from The Arthur Pequegnat Clock Company, and the Society for the Preservation of Canada's Nuclear Heritage, founded in 2017, which collects, safeguards, and promotes documents, artifacts, memorabilia, and knowledge associated with the history of the Canadian nuclear industry.

== Education ==
Deep River was last home to four schools in 2005 for students from junior kindergarten through grade 12:

- T.W. Morison Public School - now closed, it used to be for students junior kindergarten to grade 6. As decided by the school board on October 26, 2009, Morison Public School was closed down and moved into Mackenzie High School for the 2011-2012 school year in favour of making Mackenzie a JK-12 "education centre."
- Keys Public School - now closed, it used to house students grade 5 to grade 8. At the end of the 2004-2005 school year, Keys Public School was officially closed down due to budget cuts in the school board. The Junior half of Keys (grades 5 and 6) was moved to Morison Public School, and the Intermediate half (grades 7 and 8) joined Mackenzie, separated by name only (though Mackenzie students are not allowed in the Keys Wing). It was predicted Morison would close down at the end of the 2006-2007 school year (for same above mentioned reasons) and would join Mackenzie High School as well, but was delayed in a decision to close until October 2009. In 2011, with the creation of Mackenzie Community School, Keys ceased to exist; it was named for nuclear scientist David A. Keys. The Keys Public School building was rented by AECL (Atomic Energy Canada Limited) for use as an office building. There have since been small changes to the building such as new fences, change in parking, security cameras and codes and badge scanners for doors.
- Mackenzie High School - for students grades 9 to 12 (the building now houses Keys Public School). Ceased to exist as of 2011 in name; amalgamated with Keys Public School and T.W. Morison Public School to create Mackenzie Community School. It was originally named for C. J. Mackenzie, who served as head of Canada's National Research Council.
- Mackenzie Community School - for students JK to grade 12. Created in 2011 after the amalgamation of T.W. Morison Public School, Keys Public School, and Mackenzie High School; the school is housed in the previously named Mackenzie High School building. All sports team adopted the colours (Purple and Gold) and mascot (Mustangs) of Mackenzie High School. The school building also houses and hosts numerous community groups and activities.
- St. Mary's Catholic School - for students JK to grade 8

The Deep River Summer Music Camp attracts around 100 students for a two week day-camp every summer.

The Deep River Science Academy hosted university and high-school students in creating numerous science projects in cooperation with many of the knowledge-economy enterprises of the area. The Academy ceased operations in 2016.

== Media ==
=== Print ===
Deep River's weekly, The North Renfrew Times, has been published by the Deep River Community Association since the Town's earliest days.

=== Radio ===
Deep River is served by a low-power FM repeater of Ottawa's CBC Radio station, CBO-FM:

- 97.9 FM - CBCD-1, CBC Radio One

All other stations that may be heard in Deep River broadcast from Pembroke, Ontario. See radio stations in the Ottawa Valley Region and Quebec.

== Notable people ==
- Jack Gray - 40th Grey Cup Champion with the Toronto Argonauts
- Derek Harvie - TV and film writer and producer
- Russell Williams, English-born Canadian serial killer and rapist, lived in Deep River when he and his family first emigrated to Canada.
- Malcolm Burn - Music producer, recording engineer and musician
- Samantha Cornett - Professional squash player (retired). Canadian women's champion in 2014, 2015, 2018, 2019.
- Kristen den Hartog - Canadian fiction and memoir writer

== In popular culture ==
Deep River is mentioned in the David Lynch film Mulholland Drive: "I just came here from Deep River, Ontario, and now I'm in this ... dream place. You can imagine how I feel."

== See also ==
- List of francophone communities in Ontario
- List of communities in Ontario
- Ottawa Valley
- List of townships in Ontario
