= Otter Creek =

Otter Creek may refer to some places in the North America:

== Bodies of water ==
- Otter Creek (British Columbia), a river in British Columbia
- Otter Creek (Delaware River), a tributary of the Delaware River, also known as Mill Creek
- Otter Creek (Ocmulgee River tributary), a stream in Georgia that connects to the Ocmulgee River
- Otter Creek (Seventeen Mile Creek tributary), a stream in Georgia
- Otter Creek (Wabash River), a stream in Indiana
- Otter Creek (Iowa River tributary), a river in Iowa
- Otter Creek (Pechman Creek tributary), a river in Iowa
- Otter Creek (Saint Louis River), a stream in Minnesota
- Otter Creek (Lamine River), a river in Missouri
- Otter Creek (North Fork Salt River), a river in Missouri
- Otter Creek (St. Francis River), a stream in Missouri
- Otter Creek (Niobrara River tributary), a stream in Holt and Rock Counties, Nebraska
- Otter Creek (Black River tributary), a stream in New York
- Otter Creek (Tennessee), a tributary of the Little Harpeth River
- Otter Creek (Vermont), a tributary of Lake Champlain
- Otter Creek (Wisconsin), a stream in Sauk County
- Otter Creek (Lake Erie), a watershed administered by the Long Point Region Conservation Authority, that drains into Lake Erie
- Otter Creek (Wyoming) , is a stream in Wyoming and has an elevation of 6,342 feet. Otter Creek is situated south of Spring Creek, and southwest of Lone Bear Ditch Number 2.

== Cities and towns ==
- Otter Creek, Florida, a town
- Otter Creek, Georgia, an unincorporated community
- Otter Creek, Iowa, an unincorporated community
- Otter Creek, Kentucky, an unincorporated community
- Otter Creek, Minnesota, an unincorporated community near Cloquet, Minnesota
- Otter Creek, Dunn County, Wisconsin, a town
- Otter Creek, Eau Claire County, Wisconsin, a town

== Other uses ==
- Otter Creek Outdoor Recreation Area, near Louisville, Kentucky
- Otter Creek Wilderness, a wilderness area in West Virginia
- Otter Creek Brewing, a brewery in Middlebury, Vermont

== See also ==
- Otter Creek, Ontario (disambiguation)
- Otter Creek Township (disambiguation)
- Otter Creek, Wisconsin (disambiguation)
