= Little Mink Lake (Lennox and Addington County) =

Lake in Lennox and Addington County, Ontario, Canada

- Location within Ontario
- Location: Addington Highlands, Lennox and Addington County, Ontario
- Coordinates: 44°54′34″N 77°22′23″W
- Primary inflows: Two unnamed creeks
- Primary outflows: Unnamed creek
- Basin countries: Canada
- Max. length: 0.7 km (0.43 mi)
- Max. width: 0.35 km (0.22 mi)
- Surface elevation: 340 m (1,120 ft)

Little Mink Lake is a lake in the Moira River and Lake Ontario drainage basins in Addington Highlands, Lennox and Addington County in Ontario, Canada. A Hydro One transmission line crosses over the west end of the lake.

The lake is about 0.7 kilometres (0.4 mi) long and 0.35 kilometres (0.2 mi) wide and lies at an elevation of 340 metres (1,115 ft) about 12 kilometres (7 mi) northeast of the community of Gunter and 18 kilometres (11 mi) northwest of the community of Cloyne. There are two unnamed creek inflows at the east, and one unnamed creek primary outflow, at the west, towards Little Merrill Lake. Its waters flow via Merrill Creek, Partridge Creek, the Skootamatta River and the Moira River into the Bay of Quinte on Lake Ontario at Belleville.

== See also ==
- List of lakes in Ontario
