= Sulphide Creek (Hastings County) =

- Location of the mouth of Sulphide Creek in southern Ontario

Location
- Country: Canada
- Province: Ontario
- Region: Central Ontario; Eastern Ontario
- Counties: Lennox and Addington; Hastings
- Municipalities: Addington Highlands; Tweed

Physical characteristics
- Source: Unnamed lake
  - location: Addington Highlands, Lennox and Addington County
  - coordinates: 44°34′19″N 77°12′10″W
  - elevation: 209 m (686 ft)
- Mouth: Stoco Lake
  - location: Tweed, Hastings County
  - coordinates: 44°29′49″N 77°16′59″W
  - elevation: 138 m (453 ft)

Basin features
- River system: Great Lakes Basin

Sulphide Creek is a creek in the Moira River and Lake Ontario drainage basins in Tweed, Hastings County and Addington Highlands, Lennox and Addington County in Ontario, Canada.

== Course ==
Sulphide Creek begins at an unnamed lake in Addington Highlands, Lennox and Addington County, at an elevation of 209 metres (686 ft), about 600 metres (1,969 ft) south of Ontario Highway 7 and 10 kilometres (6 mi) east northeast of the community of Actinolite. It flows generally southwest almost immediately into Tweed, Hastings County, through a series of lakes and takes in several unnamed tributary creeks. It flows near the communities of Hungerford and Otter Creek to the community of Sulphide. It then heads south to its mouth at Cosy Cove, a bay on the north side of Stoco Lake and also the name of a community Cosy Cove on the bay, at an elevation of 138 metres (453 ft). Stoco Lake flows via the Moira River into the Bay of Quinte in downtown Belleville.

== See also ==
- List of rivers of Ontario
