= Queensborough, Ontario =

Queensborough Cooksokie
- Unincorporated compact rural community
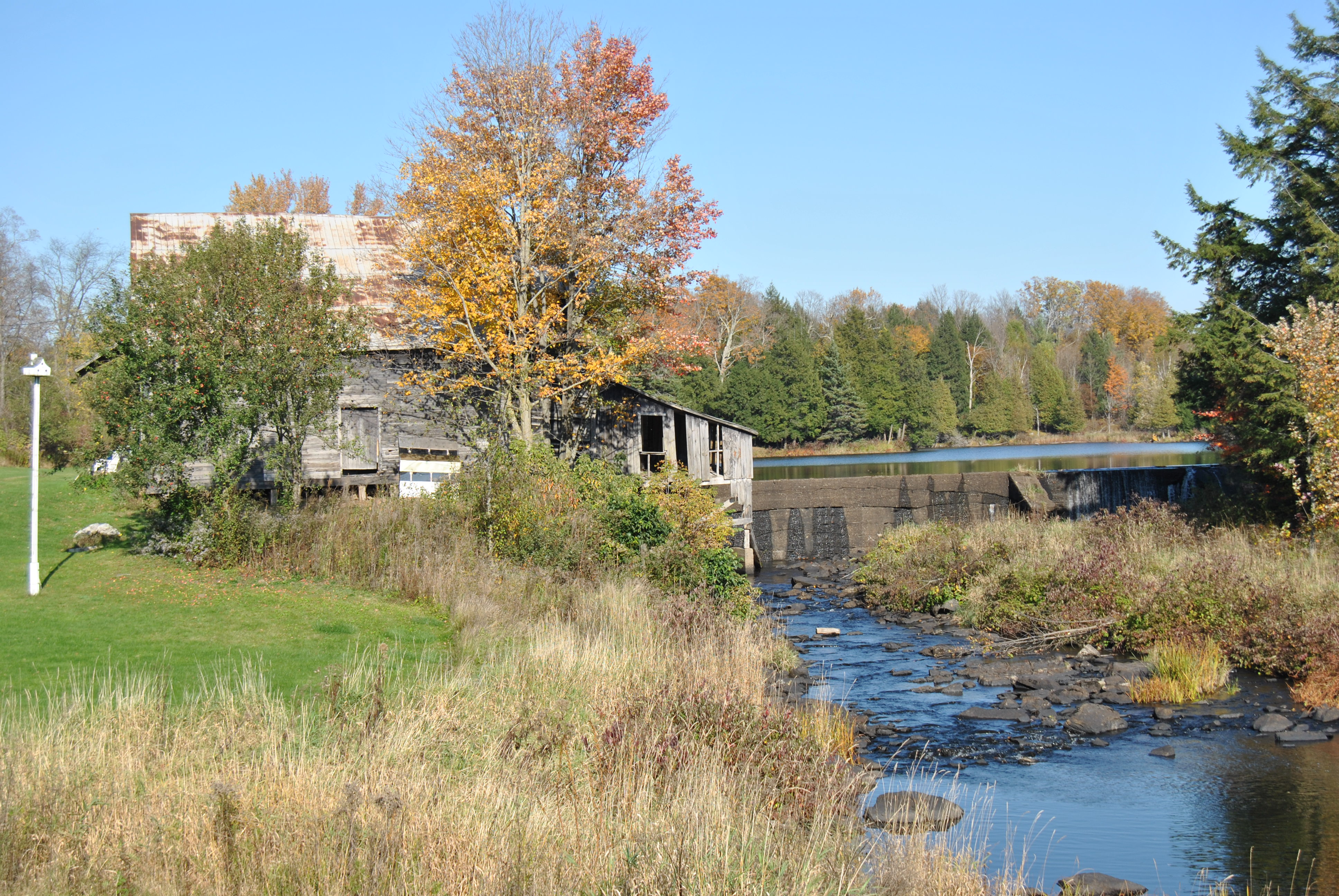
- Old dam and mill on the Black River

- Location in southern Ontario
- Coordinates: 44°35′33″N 77°24′48″W
- Country: Canada
- Province: Ontario
- County: Hastings
- Municipality: Tweed
- Ojibwe First nations: 19th century
- First European settlement: 1830
- Present name: 1850
- Elevation: 197 m (646 ft)
- Time zone: UTC-5 (Eastern Time Zone)
  - Summer (DST): UTC-4 (Eastern Time Zone)
- Postal code: K0K 2K0
- Area codes: 613, 343

Queensborough is an unincorporated community in the municipality of Tweed, Hastings County, in Central Ontario, Canada. It is located north of Ontario Highway 7 on the Black River, about 20 kilometres (12 mi) north-west of the village of Tweed and 15 kilometres (9.3 mi) north-east of the town of Madoc.

== Geography ==
Queensborough was part of the incorporated (today geographic) Elzevir Township before the creation of the amalgamated municipality of Tweed on January 1, 1998.

== History ==
The first settlement of the area was by Ojibwe First nations who called the place Cooksokie. The first European to settle the area was Miles Riggs in 1830 who built a sawmill then later a flour mill. The flour mill was purchased in 1850 by Daniel Thompson, who renamed the settlement so as to be permitted to open a post office.

A branch line of the Bay of Quinte Railway (BQR) was built through Queensborough opening in 1903 that connected the BQR main line to the southeast to the Central Ontario Railway to the northwest, which allowed the community to prosper from the mining activity in the area that the railway enabled. The line was abandoned in 1935, which led to the closures of the mines.

== Present day ==
The hamlet includes a community centre and a church in the United Church of Canada. Queensborough is served by the Madoc post office, and so its postal addresses are in Madoc at postal code K0K 2K0. The telephone area codes are 613 and 343.

The community is a canoe and kayak destination for paddlers descending the Black River in spring as part of the M.A.C.K.fest (Marmora Area Canoe and Kayak Festival), and has been recognized by Whitewater Ontario "…in appreciation of the Queensborough Community's ongoing hospitality to whitewater paddlers…".

== Transportation ==
Hastings County Road 20 crosses the town east to west, heading east then south to a junction with Ontario Highway 7 west of Actinolite, and west to a junction with Hastings County Road 12 at Hazzards Corners.

== See also ==
- Royal eponyms in Canada
