= Bogart, Ontario =

Coordinates: 44°29′53″N 77°14′55″W

Bogart is a settlement in the municipality of Tweed, Hastings County, Ontario, Canada, about 2.3 kilometres (1.4 mi) south of the community of Sulphide and 5.3 kilometres (3.3 mi) east of the village of Tweed. The Clare River, a tributary of the Moira River, flows through the community.
