= Merrill Lake =

Merrill Lake may refer to:

- Merrill Lake (Merrill Creek), a lake in Ontario
- Merrill Lake (Washington), a lake in Washington

== See also ==
- Little Merrill Lake (Merrill Creek)
