= Merrill Creek (Ontario) =

- Location of the mouth of Merrill Creek in southern Ontario

Location
- Country: Canada
- Province: Ontario
- Regions: Central Ontario; Eastern Ontario
- Counties: Hastings; Lennox and Addington

Physical characteristics
- Source: Unnamed lake
  - location: Addington Highlands, Lennox and Addington County
  - coordinates: 44°56′56″N 77°23′45″W
  - elevation: 368 m (1,207 ft)
- Mouth: Partridge Creek
  - location: Tweed, Hastings County
  - coordinates: 44°53′21″N 77°25′44″W
  - elevation: 331 m (1,086 ft)

Basin features
- River system: Great Lakes Basin

Merrill Creek is a creek in the Moira River and Lake Ontario drainage basins in Hastings and Lennox and Addington Counties, Ontario, Canada.

== Course ==
Merrill Creek begins at an unnamed lake in Addington Highlands, Lennox and Addington County at an elevation of 368 metres (1,207 ft) and flows east and then south, through Todd Lakes, to reach Merrill Lake at an elevation of 338 metres (1,109 ft). It heads south into Little Merrill Lake, then southwest to Whitefish Lake. Leaving the lake, the creek passes into the Cashel portion of Tudor and Cashel, Hastings County, then Tweed, Hastings County, and flows southwest to reach its mouth at Partridge Creek at an elevation of 331 metres (1,086 ft). Partridge Creek flows via the Skootamatta River and Moira River to the Bay of Quinte on Lake Ontario at Belleville.

== See also ==
- List of rivers of Ontario
