= Whitefish Lake (Merrill Creek) =

Lake in Lennox and Addington County, Ontario, Canada

- Location within Ontario
- Location: Cashel portion of Tudor and Cashel, Hastings County and Addington Highlands, Lennox and Addington County, Ontario
- Coordinates: 44°54′23″N 77°24′18″W
- Primary inflows: Merrill Creek
- Primary outflows: Merrill Creek
- Basin countries: Canada
- Max. length: 1.1 km (0.68 mi)
- Max. width: 0.9 km (0.56 mi)
- Surface elevation: 336 m (1,102 ft)

Whitefish Lake is a lake in the Moira River and Lake Ontario drainage basins on the border between the Cashel portion of Tudor and Cashel, Hastings County and Addington Highlands, Lennox and Addington County in Ontario, Canada.

The lake is about 1.1 kilometres (0.7 mi) long and 0.9 kilometres (0.6 mi) wide and lies at an elevation of 336 metres (1,102 ft) about 11 kilometres (7 mi) northeast of the community of Gunter and 18 kilometres (11 mi) northwest of the community of Cloyne. Only the very western tip of the lake lies in Tudor and Cashel, Hastings County, with the rest in Addington Highlands, Lennox and Addington County.

The primary inflow and outflow is Merrill Creek, flowing in at the north from Little Merrill Lake and out at the west. Merrill Creek flows via Partridge Creek, the Skootamatta River and the Moira River into the Bay of Quinte on Lake Ontario at Belleville.

== See also ==
- List of lakes in Ontario
