= Black River (Hastings County) =

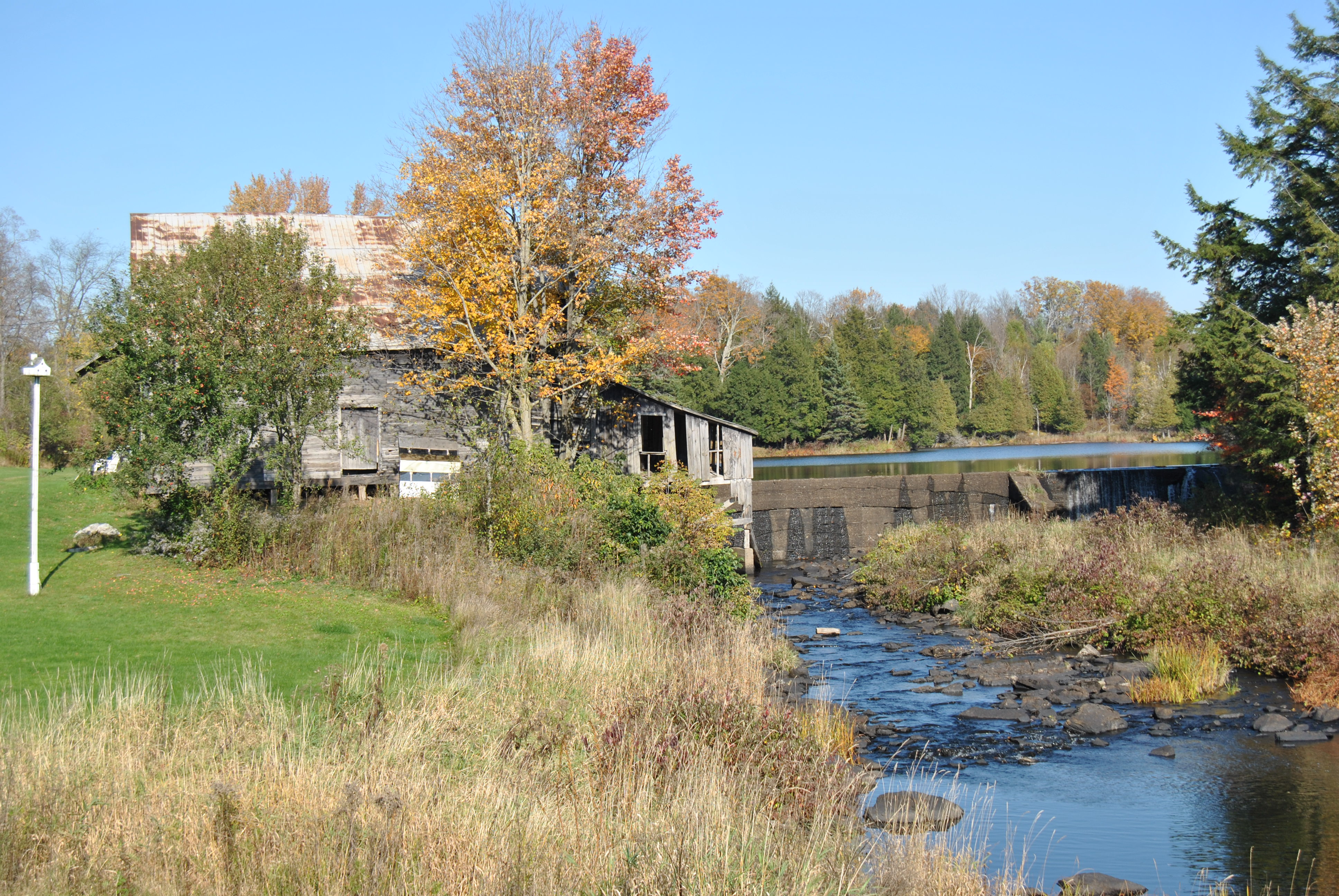
- Dam and old mill at Queensborough

- Location of the mouth of the Black River in southern Ontario

Location
- Country: Canada
- Province: Ontario
- Region: Central Ontario
- County: Hastings

Physical characteristics
- Source: Unnamed lake
  - location: Tudor and Cashel
  - coordinates: 43°53′50″N 77°31′24″W
  - elevation: 393 m (1,289 ft)
- Mouth: Moira River
  - location: Tweed
  - coordinates: 44°31′47″N 77°22′16″W
  - elevation: 155 m (509 ft)

Basin features
- River system: Great Lakes Basin
- Tributaries
  - right: West Black River

The Black River is a river in Hastings County in Central Ontario, Canada. It is part of the Great Lakes Basin, and is a left tributary of the Moira River.

== Course ==
The river begins at an unnamed lake in geographic Cashel Township, part of the municipality of Tudor and Cashel, and 2.2 kilometres (1.4 mi) northeast of the community of Gunter. It flows south then southeast, passes into geographic Grimsthorpe Township in the municipality of Tweed, and reaches Lingham Lake. It leaves the lake at the south and flows south into geographic Elzevir Township, where it takes in the right tributary West Black River, arcs briefly west into the municipality of Madoc, then returns east into Elzevir Township near the community of Queensborough. The river there goes over a weir, continues south through a series of rapids, heads under Ontario Highway 7, and reaches its mouth at the Moira River. The Moira River flows to the Bay of Quinte on Lake Ontario.

== Recreation ==
The river is used by whitewater paddlers, particularly in spring as part of the M.A.C.K.fest (Marmora Area Canoe and Kayak Festival), with the community of Queensborough serving as a friendly access point recognized by Whitewater Ontario.

== Tributaries ==
- Railway Creek (right)
- Queensborough Creek (left)
- West Black River (right)
- Canniff Creek (left)

== See also ==
- List of rivers of Ontario
