= Todd Lakes (Lennox and Addington County) =

Group of lakes in Lennox and Addington County, Ontario, Canada

- Location within Ontario
- Location: Addington Highlands, Lennox and Addington County, Ontario
- Coordinates: 44°56′06″N 77°23′32″W
- Primary inflows: Merrill Creek
- Primary outflows: Merrill Creek
- Basin countries: Canada
- Max. length: 0.5 km (0.31 mi)
- Max. width: 0.35 km (0.22 mi)
- Surface elevation: 348 m (1,142 ft)

Todd Lakes is a lake in the Moira River and Lake Ontario drainage basins in Addington Highlands, Lennox and Addington County, Ontario, Canada.

The lake is about 0.5 kilometres (0.3 mi) long and 0.35 kilometres (0.2 mi) wide and lies at an elevation of 348 metres (1,142 ft) about 13 kilometres (8 mi) northeast of the community of Gunter and 21 kilometres (13 mi) northwest of the community of Cloyne. The primary inflow, at the north, and the primary outflow, at south towards Merrill Lake, is Merrill Creek. Its waters flow via Partridge Creek, the Skootamatta River and the Moira River into the Bay of Quinte on Lake Ontario at Belleville.

== See also ==
- List of lakes in Ontario
