= Ontario Highway 37 =

Ontario provincial highway

Highway 37
- Highway 37 highlighted in red

Route information
- Maintained by the Ministry of Transportation of Ontario
- Length: 44.2 km (27.5 mi)
- Existed: January 6, 1932–present

Major junctions
- South end: Highway 401 in Belleville
- North end: Highway 7 in Actinolite

Location
- Country: Canada
- Province: Ontario

Highway system
- Ontario provincial highways; Current; Former; 400-series
← Highway 35	→ Highway 40
Former provincial highways
← Highway 36	Highway 38 →

King's Highway 37, commonly referred to as Highway 37, is a provincially maintained highway in the Canadian province of Ontario. It begins at Highway 401 in Belleville and travels 44.2 km (27.5 mi) north to Highway 7 in Actinolite. The route once continued south through Belleville to Highway 62, but was truncated in 1998. Prior to the re-routing, Highway 37 was 47.2 km (29.3 mi) long.

Highway 37 was established in 1932 to provide one of several connections with the extension of Highway 7 between Peterborough and Ottawa that opened that year. Aside from several diversions around communities along its length, the route of Highway 37 has remained relatively unchanged since then. The only major settlement on the route between its termini is the village of Tweed, located in the Municipality of Tweed (the latter henceforth referred to as Tweed in this article).

== Route description ==
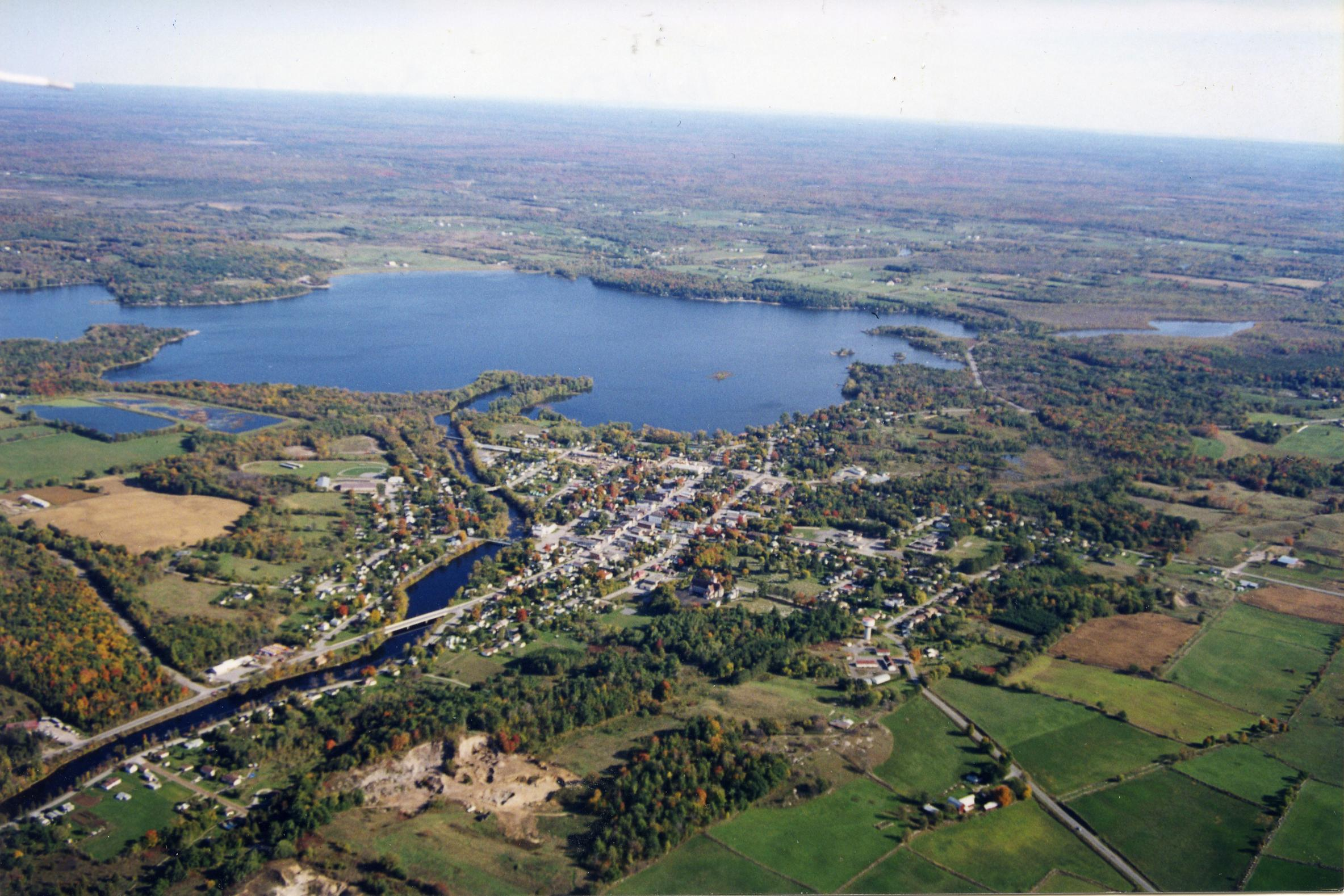
Aerial view of Tweed. Highway 37 crosses the image from bottom-left to middle-right.

Highway 37 is a 44.2 km (27.5 mi) road between Highway 401 at Belleville and Highway 7 at Actinolite that serves as a shortcut between Toronto and Ottawa. Lying entirely within Hastings County, the route travels parallel to the Moira River throughout its length. Outside of the communities that it cuts through, the majority of surrounding land use is agricultural, though forest is dominant near the Moira River. Traffic levels along Highway 37 taper gradually from south to north, and increase by approximately 144% in the summer months compared to winter months. On an average day, 9,150 vehicles travel the route immediately north of Highway 401, and 3,150 vehicles travel the route north of the village of Tweed. These represent the heaviest and lightest travelled portions of the route, respectively.

Highway 37 begins at an interchange with Highway 401 (Exit 544), south of which it continues as Cannifton Road into downtown Belleville. North of Highway 401, the route curves to the northeast, bypassing the communities of Cannifton and Corbyville. After travelling past Honeywell Corners and Thrasher's Corners, it crosses the Moira River on O'Brien's Bridge and curves east then north, bypassing the communities of Plainfield and Latta. At Roslin, the highway exits Belleville and briefly crosses into Centre Hastings, before straddling the boundary with Tweed north to Thomasburg. Bypassing east of the village, the route fully enters Tweed.

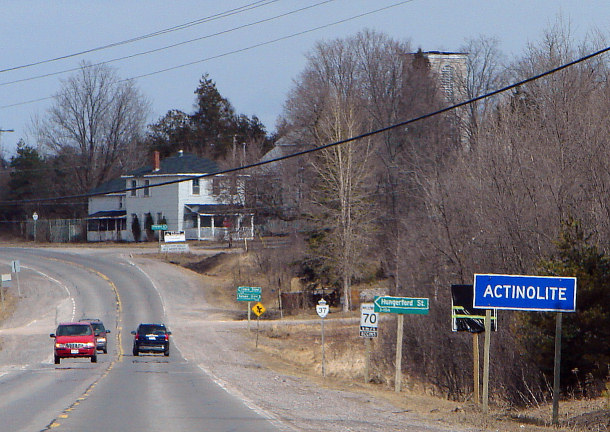
Highway 37 at Actinolite

Highway 37 meanders northeasterly, bypassing the hamlet of Chapman. It approaches Stoco Lake and turns north into the village of Tweed, where it is locally known as Victoria Street. A 2.1 km (1.3 mi) segment through the village, between Jane Street and Hastings County Road 39 (Sulphide Road), is maintained under a Connecting Link agreement. Crossing the Moira River once more and becoming Moira Street, the highway continues north out of the village alongside the river. After venturing through farmland for several kilometres, Highway 37 parallels the Skootamatta River into Actinolite, ending at Highway 7.

== History ==
Prior to the early 1930s, transportation between Toronto and Ottawa was limited due to the few roads that permeated the Canadian Shield between Lake Ontario and the Ottawa River; at that time the only option was via Highway 2 and Highway 16. The Ontario Department of Highways (DHO) set out to remedy this situation by extending Highway 7 east of Peterborough to Perth. As part of the ensuing depression-relief project, over 2700 men blasted rock, dredged muskeg and endured a constant barrage of blood-sucking insects in order to construct the new highway, which was opened to traffic on August 23, 1932.

O'Brien's Bridge in June 1952, with the old truss bridge visible

During this timeframe, the DHO assumed ownership of several north–south routes to connect Highway 7 with Highway 2. On January 6, 1932, the Belleville–Actinolite Road was designated as Highway 37. The new route followed existing Hastings County roads. Originally, Highway 37 began at Highway 14 (Front Street) in downtown Belleville, and followed Station Street and Cannifton Road north through the communities of Cannifton and Corbyville. While this section was paved, the remainder of the highway was gravel-surfaced. It was paved from Corbyville to Roslin between 1942 and 1946, and from Tweed to Actinolite in 1945. The remainder of Highway 37, from Roslin to Tweed, was paved between 1951 and 1953.

Within Tweed, Highway 37 originally followed Bridge Street and Moira Street until Victoria Street was extended north across the river in 1937. O'Brien's Bridge over Moira River south of Plainfield collapsed in spring of 1945 when a truck struck it. Construction of a new bridge to the west of the old bridge as well as a 1.1 km (0.68 mi) diversion to connect with it began that summer, and was completed the following year.

The adjacent communities of Cannifton and Corbyville were bypassed by a new alignment that opened in October 1960. In 1968, a diversion around Plainfield and Latta was opened. The interchange with Highway 401 was built beginning in 1955 as a cloverleaf, and opened along with the section of that highway between Trenton and Marysville on October 7, 1958. The interchange was rebuilt in 1991 as a parclo AB, with the ramps on the west side of Highway 37 being removed.

== Major intersections ==
The following table lists the major junctions along Highway 37, as noted by the Ministry of Transportation of Ontario.

Division	Location	km	mi	Destinations	Notes
Belleville		−3.0	−1.9	Front Street Highway 62 (Pinnacle Street)	Former Highway 37 southern terminus
Belleville		0.0	0.0	Highway 401 – Toronto, Kingston	Highway 37 southern terminus; Highway 401 exit 544
Belleville		3.5	2.2	Canniffton Road / Blessington Road	
Belleville		11.2	7.0	Phillipston Road	
Belleville–Hastings boundary	Belleville–Centre Hastings boundary	19.3	12.0	County Road 7 east (Shannonville Road)	Roslin
Hastings	Centre Hastings–Tweed boundary	22.2	13.8	County Road 8 west (Moira Road)	
Hastings	Tweed	33.8	21.0	County Road 13 east (Marlbank Road)	
Hastings	Tweed	34.2	21.3	Jane Street	Beginning of Tweed Connecting Link agreement
Hastings	Tweed	34.8	21.6	County Road 38 west (River Street)	
Hastings	Tweed	36.1	22.4	County Road 39 east (Sulphide Road)	
Hastings	Tweed	36.3	22.6		End of Tweed Connecting Link agreement
Hastings	Tweed	44.2	27.5	Highway 7 / TCH – Madoc, Perth	Actinolite; Highway 37 northern terminus
1.000 mi = 1.609 km; 1.000 km = 0.621 mi: Closed/former
