= Hungerford, Ontario =

Settlement in Tweed, Ontario, Canada

Coordinates: 44°32′16″N 77°11′54″W

Hungerford is a settlement in the municipality of Tweed, Hastings County, Ontario, Canada, about 4.5 kilometres (2.8 mi) east of the community of Sulphide and 11.6 kilometres (7.2 mi) northeast of the village of Tweed. Sulphide Creek, a tributary of the Moira River, flows northwest the community.

The township of Hungerford once encompassed the southern third of the present-day municipality of Tweed, including the village of Tweed itself. The earliest known European settlement of this region was in 1826.
