= Otter Creek, Hastings County =

Locality in Hastings County, Ontario, Canada

Coordinates: 44°31′18″N 77°12′30″W

Otter Creek is the name of a settlement in the municipality of Tweed, Hastings County, Ontario, Canada. It lies 3 kilometres (1.9 mi) east of the community of Sulphide and 10 kilometres (6 mi) northeast of the village of Tweed. Otter Creek, a tributary of the Clare River in the Moira River drainage basin, flows through the community.
