= Cosy Cove, Ontario =

Coordinates: 44°29′26″N 77°16′50″W

Cosy Cove is a settlement on Stoco Lake in the municipality of Tweed, Hastings County, Ontario, Canada, about 4 kilometres (2.5 mi) southwest of Sulphide and 2.5 kilometres (1.6 mi) east of Tweed village. Sulphide Creek, a tributary of the Moira River, reaches its mouth at the lake.
