= Otter Creek Township, Illinois =

Otter Creek Township, Illinois may refer to one of the following townships:

- Otter Creek Township, Jersey County, Illinois
- Otter Creek Township, LaSalle County, Illinois

See also

- Otter Creek Township (disambiguation)
