= Merrill Lake (Lennox and Addington County) =

Lake in Ontario, Canada

- Location within Ontario
- Location: Cashel portion of Tudor and Cashel, Hastings County and Addington Highlands, Lennox and Addington County, Ontario
- Coordinates: 44°55′24″N 77°24′11″W
- Primary inflows: Merrill Creek
- Primary outflows: Merrill Creek
- Basin countries: Canada
- Max. length: 4.3 km (2.7 mi)
- Max. width: 1.3 km (0.81 mi)
- Surface elevation: 338 m (1,109 ft)

Merrill Lake is a lake in the Moira River and Lake Ontario drainage basins that straddles the border between the Cashel portion of Tudor and Cashel, Hastings County and Addington Highlands, Lennox and Addington County in Ontario, Canada.

The lake is about 4.3 kilometres (2.7 mi) long and 1.3 kilometres (0.8 mi) wide and lies at an elevation of 338 metres (1,109 ft) about 12 kilometres (7 mi) northeast of the community of Gunter and 19 kilometres (12 mi) northwest of the community of Cloyne. The northwest end of the lake lies in Tudor and Cashel, Hastings County, the rest in Addington Highlands, Lennox and Addington County.

The primary inflow is Merrill Creek from Todd Lakes at the north of the east bay, and there are six unnamed creek secondary inflows: one at the northwest, three at the north and two at the north of the east bay. Merrill Creek is also the primary outflow, at the southeast towards Little Merrill Lake. It flows via Partridge Creek, the Skootamatta River and the Moira River into the Bay of Quinte on Lake Ontario at Belleville.

== See also ==
- List of lakes in Ontario
