= Number Ten Creek =

- Location of the mouth of Number Ten Creek in southern Ontario.

Location
- Country: Canada
- Province: Ontario
- Region: Central Ontario
- County: Hastings
- Municipality: Belleville

Physical characteristics
- Source: Unnamed field
  - coordinates: 44°20′48″N 77°22′36″W
  - elevation: 139 m (456 ft)
- Mouth: Chrysal Creek
  - coordinates: 44°16′50″N 77°23′55″W
  - elevation: 104 m (341 ft)
- Length: 13.1 km (8.1 mi)

Basin features
- River system: Great Lakes Basin

Number Ten Creek is a creek in the Moira River and Lake Ontario drainage basins in Belleville, Hastings County, Ontario, Canada.

== Course ==
Number Ten Creek begins in an unnamed field at an elevation of 139 metres (456 ft) about 2.7 kilometres (1.7 mi) southeast of the community of Moira. It flows west into an unnamed pond where it takes in an unnamed right tributary, then turns south. The creek continues to the east of the community of Phillipston, then heads southwest through the community of Zion Hill. Finally, it turns southeast and reaches its mouth at Chrysal Creek, at an elevation of 104 metres (341 ft), which flows via the Moira River into the Bay of Quinte in downtown Belleville.

== See also ==
- List of rivers of Ontario
