= Chrysal Creek =

- Location of the mouth of Chrysal Creek in southern Ontario

Location
- Country: Canada
- Province: Ontario
- Region: Central Ontario
- County: Hastings
- Municipalities: Belleville; Quinte West

Physical characteristics
- Source: Unnamed slope
  - location: Quinte West
  - coordinates: 44°16′04″N 77°29′57″W
  - elevation: 176 m (577 ft)
- Mouth: Moira River
  - location: Belleville
  - coordinates: 44°16′19″N 77°22′44″W
  - elevation: 103 m (338 ft)
- Length: 15.1 km (9.4 mi)

Basin features
- River system: Great Lakes Basin
- Tributaries
  - left: Number Ten Creek

Chrysal Creek is a creek in the Moira River and Lake Ontario drainage basins in Belleville and Quinte West, Hastings County, Ontario, Canada.

== Course ==
Chrysal Creek begins at an unnamed slope at an elevation of 176 metres (577 ft), about 1.1 kilometres (0.7 mi) southeast of the community of Oak Lake. It flows south and is crossed by the former Ontario Highway 14. The creek turns east back under Highway 14, continues east, flowing under Ontario Highway 62 about 1.7 kilometres (1.1 mi) south of the community of Halloway, and passes into Belleville. It continues east and splits into two branches at the point where a Hydro One transmission line crosses. The northern branch takes in the left tributary Number Ten Creek at an elevation of 104 metres (341 ft), then the two combine once again shortly before the creek reaches its mouth at the Moira River at an elevation of 103 metres (338 ft), about 1.1 kilometres (0.7 mi) west of the community of Thrasher's Corners on Ontario Highway 37. The Moira flows into the Bay of Quinte in downtown Belleville.

== See also ==
- List of rivers of Ontario
