= Otter Creek, Ontario =

Otter Creek in Ontario, Canada may refer to:

- Otter Creek, Bruce County, Ontario
- Otter Creek, Hastings County, a settlement in Hastings County
- Otter Creek (Hastings County), a creek in Hastings County
