= Little Merrill Lake (Lennox and Addington County) =

Lake in Ontario, Canada

- Location within Ontario
- Location: Addington Highlands, Lennox and Addington County, Ontario
- Coordinates: 44°54′37″N 77°23′43″W
- Primary inflows: Merrill Creek
- Primary outflows: Merrill Creek
- Basin countries: Canada
- Max. length: 1.6 km (0.99 mi)
- Max. width: 0.6 km (0.37 mi)
- Surface elevation: 337 m (1,106 ft)

Little Merrill Lake is a lake in the Moira River and Lake Ontario drainage basins in Addington Highlands, Lennox and Addington County in Ontario, Canada.

The lake is about 1.6 kilometres (1.0 mi) long and 0.6 kilometres (0.4 mi) wide and lies at an elevation of 337 metres (1,106 ft) about 12 kilometres (7 mi) northeast of the community of Gunter and 18 kilometres (11 mi) northwest of the community of Cloyne. The primary inflow is Merrill Creek from Merrill Lake at the north, and there are three unnamed creek secondary inflows: one at the northeast, one at the east from Little Mink Lake, and one at the southeast. Merrill Creek is also the primary outflow, at the southwest, towards Whitefish Lake. Merrill Creek flows via Partridge Creek, the Skootamatta River and the Moira River into the Bay of Quinte on Lake Ontario at Belleville.

== See also ==
- List of lakes in Ontario
