= Otterville, Missouri =

- City
- Location of Otterville, Missouri

- Location within Missouri Location within the United States
- Coordinates: 38°42′11″N 93°00′08″W
- Country: United States
- State: Missouri
- County: Cooper
- Township: Otterville
- Founded: 1837 (as Elkton); 1848 (as Otterville)
- Incorporated: 1848
- Named for: Otter Creek

Area
  - Total: 0.49 sq mi (1.27 km^{2})
  - Land: 0.49 sq mi (1.27 km^{2})
  - Water: 0 sq mi (0.00 km^{2})
- Elevation: 810 ft (250 m)

Population (2020)
  - Total: 440
  - Density: 899.3/sq mi (347.23/km^{2})
- Time zone: UTC-6 (Central (CST))
  - Summer (DST): UTC-5 (CDT)
- ZIP code: 65348
- Area code: 660
- FIPS code: 29-55478
- GNIS feature ID =: 2396108
- Website: www.ottervillemo.gov

Otterville is a city in southwest Cooper County, Missouri, United States. As of the 2020 census, Otterville had a population of 440.

== History ==
Otterville was originally called Elkton, and under the latter name was platted in 1837. The present name is after nearby Otter Creek. A post office called Otterville has been in operation since 1848.

== Geography ==
Otterville is located on routes A and BB three-quarters of a mile north of the county line and U.S. Route 50. The community is on the Long Branch tributary to the Lamine River and the Lamine River Conservation Area which is one mile east of the town. Clifton City is about 4.5 miles to the north on route BB. Syracuse is about seven miles to the east-southeast in Morgan County and Smithton is about 4.5 miles to the southwest in Pettis County. Sedalia is twelve miles to the west.

According to the United States Census Bureau, the city has a total area of 0.49 square miles (1.27 km^{2}), all land.

== Demographics ==
Historical population
Census	Pop.	Note	%±
1880	505		—
1890	439		−13.1%
1900	384		−12.5%
1910	453		18.0%
1920	482		6.4%
1930	421		−12.7%
1940	430		2.1%
1950	414		−3.7%
1960	416		0.5%
1970	440		5.8%
1980	472		7.3%
1990	507		7.4%
2000	476		−6.1%
2010	454		−4.6%
2020	440		−3.1%
U.S. Decennial Census

=== 2010 census ===
As of the census of 2010, there were 454 people, 190 households, and 125 families living in the city. The population density was 926.5 inhabitants per square mile (357.7/km^{2}). There were 224 housing units at an average density of 457.1 units per square mile (176.5 units/km^{2}). The racial makeup of the city was 96.3% White, 1.3% African American, 0.7% Native American, and 1.8% from two or more races. Hispanic or Latino of any race were 1.1% of the population.

There were 190 households, of which 33.7% had children under the age of 18 living with them, 48.9% were married couples living together, 12.6% had a female householder with no husband present, 4.2% had a male householder with no wife present, and 34.2% were non-families. 30.0% of all households were made up of individuals, and 15.3% had someone living alone who was 65 years of age or older. The average household size was 2.39 and the average family size was 2.90.

The median age in the city was 36 years. 26.9% of residents were under the age of 18; 5.6% were between the ages of 18 and 24; 25.5% were from 25 to 44; 26% were from 45 to 64; and 15.9% were 65 years of age or older. The gender makeup of the city was 47.1% male and 52.9% female.

=== 2000 census ===
As of the census of 2000, there were 476 people, 200 households, and 136 families living in the city. The population density was 972.5 inhabitants per square mile (375.5/km^{2}). There were 226 housing units at an average density of 461.7 units per square mile (178.3 units/km^{2}). The racial makeup of the city was 98.53% White, 0.21% Native American, 0.42% from other races, and 0.84% from two or more races. Hispanic or Latino of any race were 0.84% of the population.

There were 200 households, out of which 28.0% had children under the age of 18 living with them, 53.0% were married couples living together, 9.5% had a female householder with no husband present, and 32.0% were non-families. 27.0% of all households were made up of individuals, and 11.5% had someone living alone who was 65 years of age or older. The average household size was 2.38 and the average family size was 2.85.

In the city the population was spread out, with 22.1% under the age of 18, 11.3% from 18 to 24, 22.9% from 25 to 44, 27.7% from 45 to 64, and 16.0% who were 65 years of age or older. The median age was 40 years. For every 100 females, there were 95.9 males. For every 100 females age 18 and over, there were 89.3 males.

The median income for a household in the city was $27,031, and the median income for a family was $33,750. Males had a median income of $25,125 versus $16,250 for females. The per capita income for the city was $12,741. About 8.1% of families and 14.3% of the population were below the poverty line, including 21.9% of those under age 18 and 15.6% of those age 65 or over.

=== Media ===
KCVK (107.7 FM) is an affiliate of Spirit FM, a network of non-commercial Christian music and talk stations owned by Lake Area Educational Broadcasting Foundation. KCVK's programming originates from KCVO in Camdenton.
