= Eldorado, Ontario =

Community in Ontario, Canada

Coordinates: 44°35′16″N 77°31′10″W

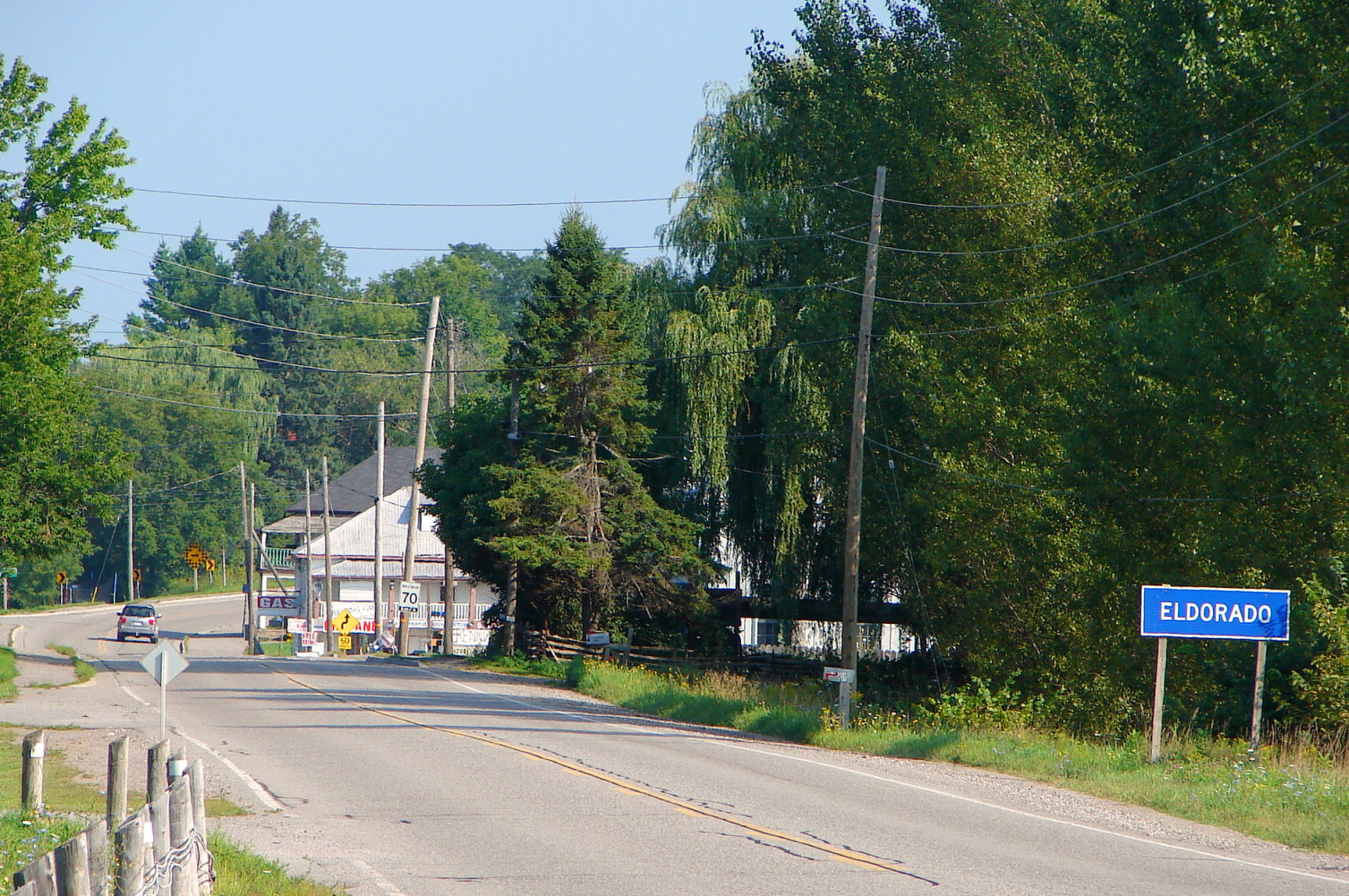
Eldorado, 2010

Eldorado is a community in Madoc Township, in Ontario, Canada, with a 2019 population of 50.

In 1866, it was the location of Ontario's first gold rush after Marcus Herbert Powell found gold on John Richardson's farm.

== Location ==
Eldorado is located six miles away from the centre of Madoc.

== History ==
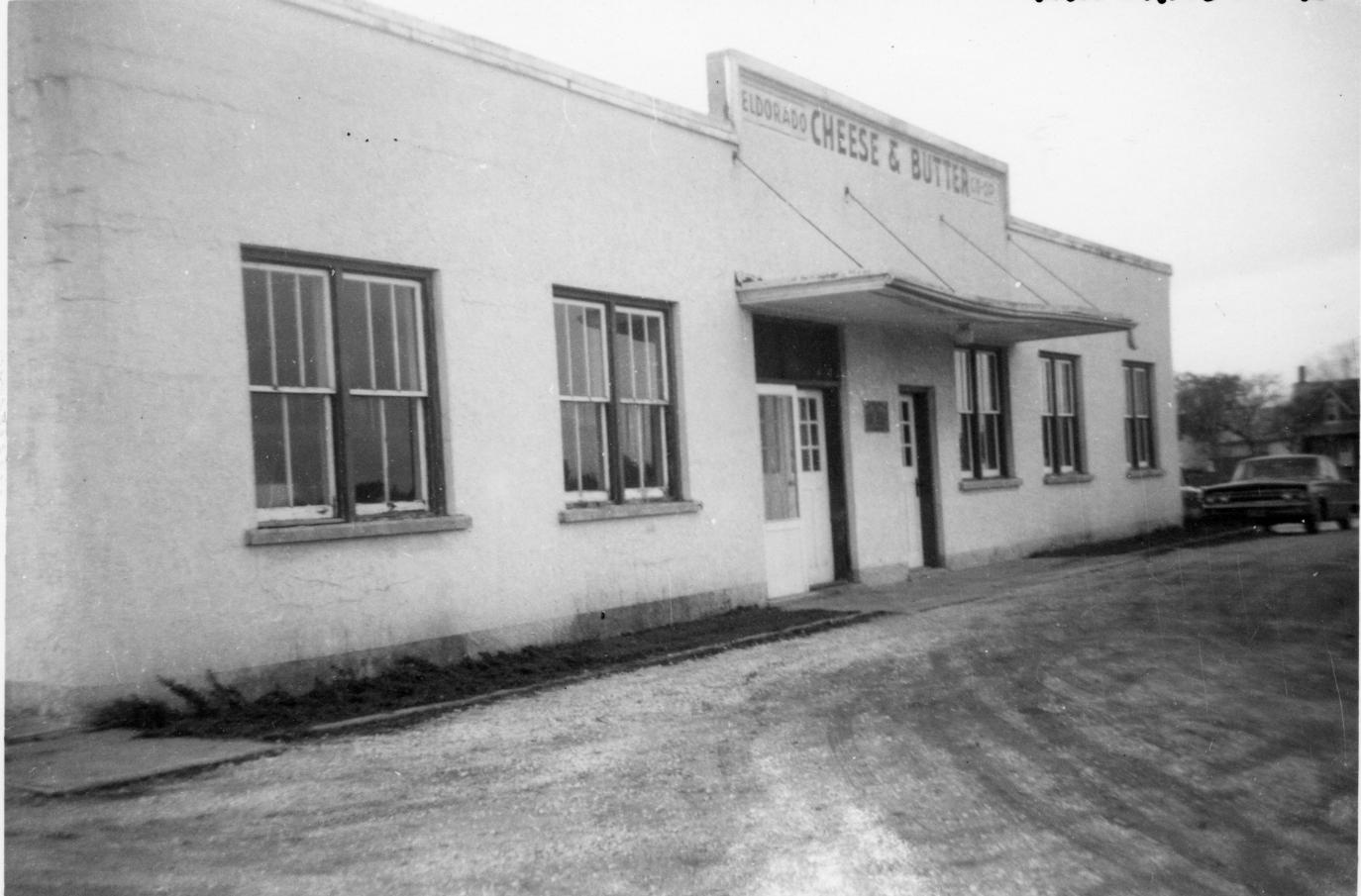
Eldorado Cheese and Butter Co-op store, c. 1960

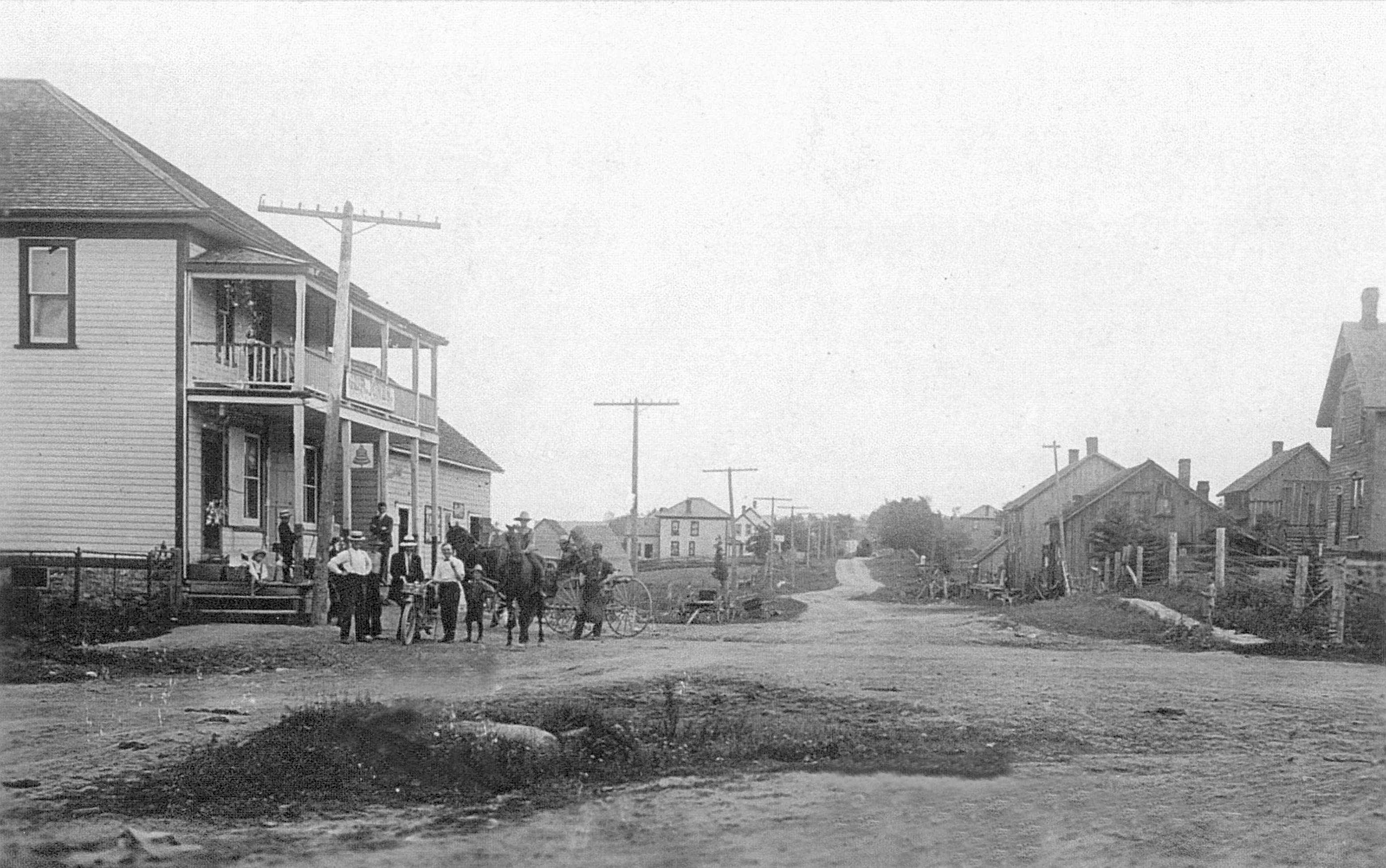
Eldorado, c.1900

Municipal employee and part-time prospector Marcus Herbert Powell found gold on August 15, 1866, on a farm owned by John Richardson's.

The town of Eldorado was founded in 1867. The same year the Richardson Mine went into operation. Despite higher expectations, Powell extracted about 100 ounces of gold, worth $1,500 to $2,000 at the time, but no further gold was found. Various other mines that had quickly opened, quickly closed.

== Demographics ==
In 2019 the population of Eldorado was 50, down from 4,000 during the gold rush. In contemporary times, it is considered to be a ghost town.
