= Actinolite, Ontario =

Actinolite
- Compact rural community
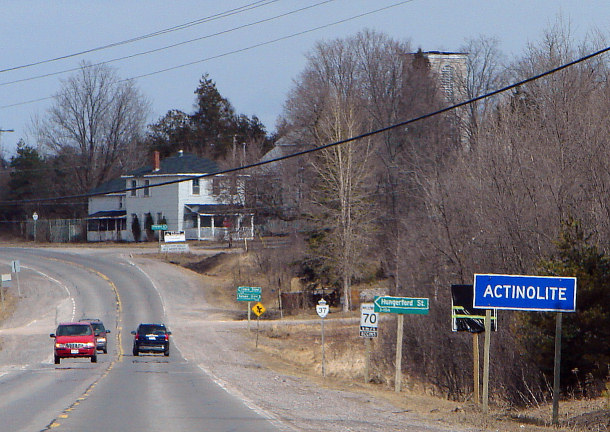
- Village of the chase Hudson

- Location in southern Ontario
- Coordinates: 44°32′38″N 77°19′34″W
- Country: Canada
- Province: Ontario
- County: Hastings
- Municipality: Tweed
- Established: 1853
- Present name: 1895
- Elevation: 168 m (551 ft)
- Time zone: UTC-5 (Eastern Time Zone)
  - Summer (DST): UTC-4 (Eastern Time Zone)
- Postal code FSA: K0K
- Area codes: 613, 343

Actinolite (/ækˈtɪnoʊlaɪt/ ak-TIN-oh-lyte) is a compact rural community within geographic Elzevir Township in the Municipality of Tweed, Hastings County in Central Ontario, Canada. It is on Ontario Highway 37, just south of Ontario Highway 7 and north of the village of Tweed. The community also lies on the Skootamatta River just north of that river's mouth at the Moira River.

== History ==
When Actinolite was first founded in 1853, it was called Troy. A number of Billa Flint's sawmills were built on the Skootamatta River here. In 1859, it became Bridgewater. In 1895, it was renamed Actinolite after a form of asbestos (actinolite) that was being extracted from open-pit mines near the town.

A branch line of the Bay of Quinte Railway (BQR) was built through Actinolite opening in 1903 that connected the BQR main line to the southeast to the Central Ontario Railway to the northwest. The line was abandoned in 1935. Ontario Highway 7 arrived in 1932.
