= Plainfield, Ontario =

Plainfield
- Community
- Plainfield, Ontario
- Location within Ontario
- Coordinates: 44.292°N 77.347°W
- Country: Canada
- Province: Ontario
- County: Hastings
- Incorporated: 1960

Government
  - Federal riding: Hastings-Lennox and Addington
  - MP: Shelby Kramp-Neuman
  - Prov. riding: Hastings - Lennox and Addington
  - MPP: Daryl Kramp

Population (2009)
  - Total: 138
- Time zone: UTC-5 (EST)
  - Summer (DST): UTC-4 (EDT)
- Postal Code: K0K
- Area code: 613

Plainfield, Ontario is a small rural community in the Canadian province of Ontario. It is located in Hastings County 10 miles north of Belleville.

== History ==
In 1851, Plainfield was called Latta's Mills. It received its current name in 1860 to "reflect the relatively level topography of the area".

Legend has it that John Meyers, founder of Plainfield, saw two Aboriginal people in a canoe with a large load of silver. Meyers followed them secretly to the Scuttlehole caves. As he followed them they disappeared. It is believed that the silver is hidden somewhere in the caves. Many visitors have tried to find the silver through spelunking.

== Education ==
While this community is part of the Hastings and Prince Edward District School Board and the Algonquin and Lakeshore Catholic District School Board, there are presently no educational institutions in Plainfield.

== Tourism ==
The HR Frink Centre is an outdoor education centre located in the Plainfield Conservation Area. It is often frequented by school groups. There are 14 km of trails, such as Settler, Drumlin, and Pixie, and 341 acres of Conservation Area. There are also boardwalks that stretch across a cat-tail swamp on the south side and a silver maple swamp on the north side. The Frink Centre's north-side borders the Moira River, which flows through Plainfield.

== Women's Institute ==
Founded on March 5, 1910, the Plainfield Women's Institute celebrated their 100th anniversary in 2010. These women serve the South Hastings communities of Plainfield, Cannifton, Corbyville, Foxboro, and Belleville. The institute provides education and support programs and services, advocates for social and economic change, and strives towards the personal growth and empowerment of all women as more knowledgeable and responsible citizens. The group also aims to help women develop good family, life and leadership skills and helps resolve community issues. Although a Plainfield women's institution, the non-profit association meets in the neighbouring hamlet of Corbyville.

== See also ==
- List of communities in Ontario
