= Marlbank, Ontario =

Community in Tweed, Ontario, Canada

Coordinates: 44°26′00″N 77°05′30″W

Marlbank is a small community located in Tweed, Ontario, Canada, a few kilometres west of Highway 41.

Marlbank developed around a factory that produced cement from locally mined marl, a carbonate-rich mud or mudstone which contains variable amounts of clays and silt. The community is the home of the hardest underwater cement in the world that built the Panama Canal. Marlbank village has many homes built from blocks using the same locally produced cement.

In 2024, a 19th-century steam locomotive used at the factory was rescued from a lake near Marlbank. Marlbank Phoenix Tavern is a long-established tavern in the community that has survived fires and neglect. In 1904, a fire erupted at the site which currently holds the tavern, but the building was rebuilt in 1905, and was known as The Stinson House. The owners opened their doors and served beverages to patrons. In 1907, the building and ownership changed hands to Mr. William O'Keefe, who renamed the pub after himself, calling it the O'Keefe House.

The business held fast to this name through several years and owners until 1938, when Sam Schell named the building "The Marlbank House".

After a fire destroyed most of the building again in 1994, the tavern's name changed once more to "the Marlbank Phoenix Tavern". From early 2009, the Tavern was closed for almost two years and left to fall into disrepair. Two local residents, Ray and Ivy Hutchinson, and their son David, bought and rescued this historical landmark. After major renovations, the Marlbank Phoenix Tavern reopened for business in January 2011.
