= Otter Creek (Hastings County) =

- Location of the mouth of Otter Creek in southern Ontario

Location
- Country: Canada
- Province: Ontario
- Region: Central Ontario, Eastern Ontario
- Counties: Hastings; Lennox and Addington; Frontenac
- Municipalities: Tweed; Addington Highlands; Central Frontenac

Physical characteristics
- Source: Unnamed lake
  - location: Addington Highlands, Lennox and Addington County
  - coordinates: 44°39′43″N 77°07′17″W
  - elevation: 256 m (840 ft)
- 2nd source: Wallbridge Lake
  - location: Central Frontenac, Frontenac County
  - coordinates: 44°42′20″N 76°59′48″W
  - elevation: 212 m (696 ft)
- Mouth: Clare River
  - location: Tweed, Hastings County
  - coordinates: 44°29′43″N 77°13′35″W
  - elevation: 144 m (472 ft)

Basin features
- River system: Great Lakes Basin

Otter Creek is a creek in the Moira River and Lake Ontario drainage basins in Tweed, Hastings County, Addington Highlands, Lennox and Addington County and Central Frontenac, Frontenac County in Ontario, Canada.

== See also ==
- List of rivers of Ontario
