= Clare River (Ontario) =

- Location of the mouth of the Clare River in southern Ontario

Location
- Country: Canada
- Province: Ontario
- Region: Central Ontario, Eastern Ontario
- Counties: Hastings; Lennox and Addington

Physical characteristics
- Source: Unnamed confluence
  - location: Stone Mills, Lennox and Addington County
  - coordinates: 44°35′38″N 77°01′58″W
  - elevation: 189 m (620 ft)
- Mouth: Stoco Lake
  - location: Tweed, Hastings County
  - coordinates: 44°28′58″N 77°16′31″W
  - elevation: 138 m (453 ft)

Basin features
- River system: Great Lakes Basin
- Tributaries
  - left: Otter Creek
  - right: Goose Creek

The Clare River is a river that is part of the Moira River system in the Lake Ontario drainage basin in Hastings and Lennox and Addington Counties, Ontario, Canada.

== Course ==
The Clare River begins at the junction of several unnamed creeks in the township of Stone Mills, Lennox and Addington County at an elevation of 189 metres (620 ft). It flows southwest into Calpin Lake at an elevation of 171 metres (561 ft) at the community of McGuire Settlement, then continues southwest under Highway 41. It then turns west and passes into the municipality of Tweed, Hastings County. It takes in the left tributary Goose Creek and right tributary Otter Creek, flows past the settlement of Bogart, and empties into the east side of Stoco Lake on the Moira River at an elevation of 138 metres (453 ft). The Moira River flows into the Bay of Quinte on Lake Ontario at Belleville.

== See also ==
- List of rivers of Ontario
