= Otter Creek, Wisconsin =

Otter Creek is the name of two places in the U.S. state of Wisconsin:

- Otter Creek, Dunn County, Wisconsin, a town
- Otter Creek, Eau Claire County, Wisconsin, a town
