= Richardson Mine =

Gold mine in Ontario, Canada

- Location near Eldorado, Ontario Richardson Mine (Southern Ontario) Richardson Mine (Ontario)
- Location: Eldorado,Ontario,Canada; 44°58′N 77°52′W
- Products: Gold
- Production: 100 ounces
- Greatest depth: 15 feet
- Discovered: 1866
- Opened: 1867
- Closed: 1869
- Company: Kim Woodside
- Website: www.eldoradoexperience.ca

The Richardson Mine was Ontario's first gold mine, opened by Marcus Herbert Powell in 1867. The mine's opening caused Ontario's first gold rush, prompting the founding of Eldorado, Ontario the same year.

After only 100 ounces of gold was extracted, the mine closed in 1869.

== History ==
On August 15, 1866, Ontario Divisional Court clerk employee and part-time prospector Marcus Herbert Powell discovered gold while prospecting for copper on an Ontario farm near Madoc owned by John Richardson. Powell initially leased 19 acres of the farm in exchange for 50% of what gold could be extracted. Powell then sold the farm to two Chicago miners called Lombard and Hardin for $36,000. $21,000 of that went to farmer John Richardson, Powell took $10,000, and Powell's prospecting partners William Berryman and Snider received $1,500 and $3,500 respectively.

Mining commenced in 1867, with the site being named the Richardson Mine. Powell dug 15 feet down through rock to reach a cave that was 12 feet, by 6 feet by six feet. The cave contained pyrite and visible gold in the form of leaves, sheets, and nuggets as large as a walnut.

The same year, the town of Eldorado was founded to accommodate the rush of prospectors to the area. Eighty hotels and accommodations were constructed to house the influx of 4,000 prospectors and tourists who travelled from as far away as British Columbia and California. The Deloro, Gilmour, Cordova, Feigle, Bannockburn, and Golden Fleece mines all opened. After lower quantities of gold than expected were found at the other mines, suspicions arose that Powell was lying about finding gold. A group of 100 prospectors and miners forced their way into the Richardson Mine's property to inspect it for themselves. Powell negotiated with the crowd, and agreed to let the group's leader "Caribou" Cameron inspect the cave, which he did, with one other man, before the Royal Canadian Mounted Police arrived from Madoc to support Powell.

By 1869, only 100 ounces of gold, (worth $1,500 to $2,000 at the time) was extracted from the mine and no further gold was found beyond what was found in the first cavern.

The various other mines that has lower production and also quickly closed.

== See also ==
- Belleville and North Hastings Railway
- List of gold mines in Canada
- List of mines in the Bancroft area
