= Otter Creek (Wisconsin) =

Stream in Sauk County, Wisconsin, U.S.

Coordinates: 43°14′25″N 89°48′23″W

Otter Creek is a stream in Sauk County, Wisconsin, in the United States.

Otter Creek was named after the otters seen there by early settlers.

== See also ==
- List of rivers of Wisconsin
