= Otter Creek (Wabash River tributary) =

Stream in Clay and Vigo County, Indiana, U.S.

Coordinates: 39°33′59″N 87°24′00″W

Otter Creek is a stream in Clay and Vigo counties, in the U.S. state of Indiana. It is a tributary of the Wabash River.

Otter Creek was so named for the otters seen there by early settlers.

== See also ==
- List of rivers of Indiana
