= Otter Creek (Lamine River tributary) =

Stream in the US state of Missouri

Otter Creek is a stream in Cooper and Morgan Counties in the U.S. state of Missouri. It is a tributary of the Lamine River.

The stream headwaters arise in northern Morgan County northeast of Syracuse and just west of Missouri Route 5 at 38°40′37″N 92°51′36″W at an elevation of about 930 feet. The stream flows to the northwest into Cooper County and on to its confluence with the Lamine River about two miles northeast of Otterville at 38°43′35″N 92°58′39″W and an elevation of 645 feet.

Otter Creek was so named for the fact it was a hunting ground for otters by pioneers.

== See also ==
- List of rivers of Missouri
