= Otter Creek (Pechman Creek tributary) =

Stream in Iowa, U.S.

Coordinates: 41°30′17″N 91°30′28″W

Otter Creek is a stream in the U.S. state of Iowa. It is a tributary to Pechman Creek.

Otter Creek was named for the North American river otters once found there.
