= Otter Creek (Iowa River tributary) =

Stream in Louisa County, Iowa, U.S.

Coordinates: 41.1166993°N 91.1307034°W

Otter Creek is a stream in Louisa County, Iowa, in the United States. It is a tributary of the Iowa River.

Otter Creek was so named because early settlers saw otters in the creek.

== See also ==
- List of rivers of Iowa
