= Otter Creek, Dunn County, Wisconsin =

Otter Creek, Wisconsin
- Town
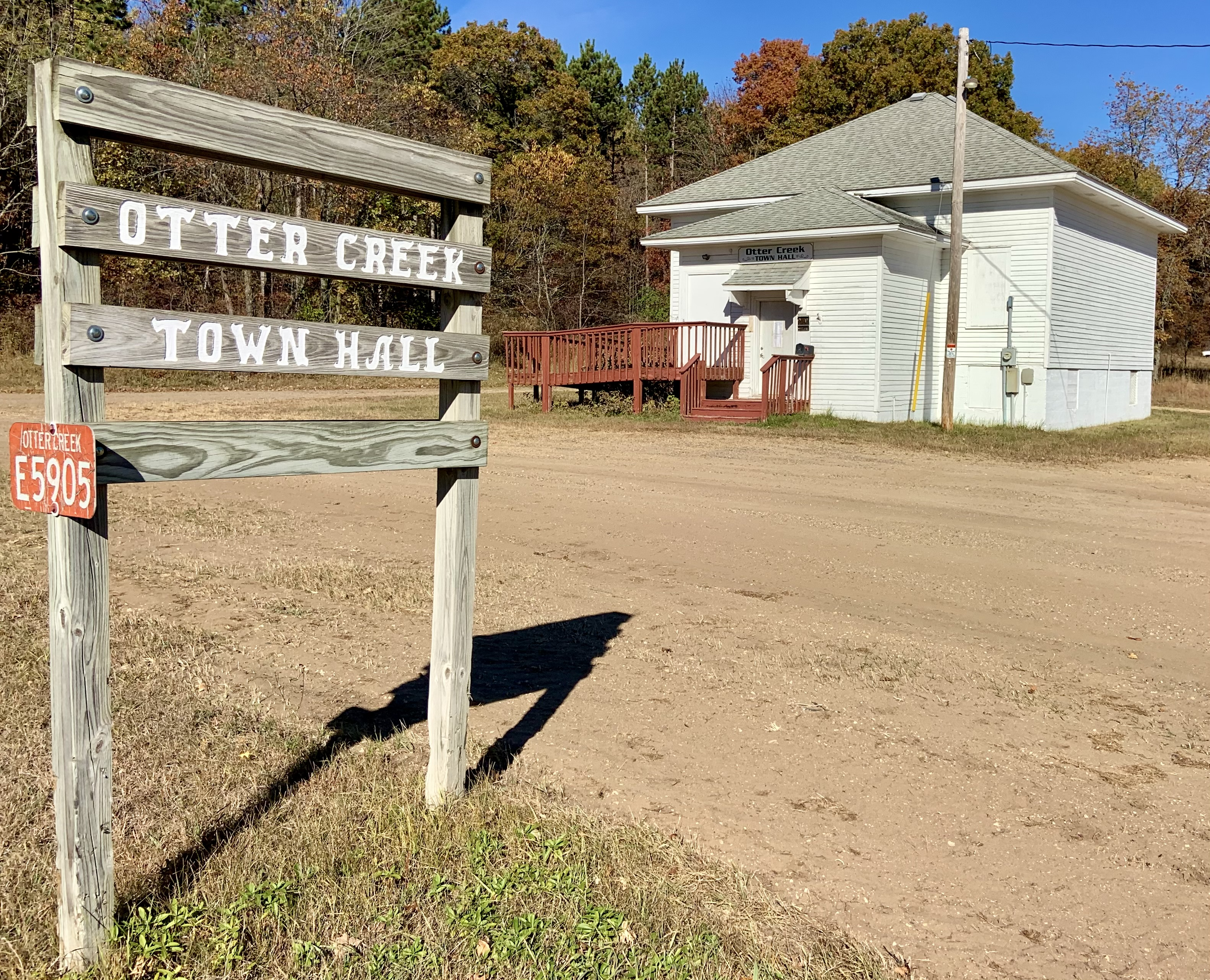
- Town hall

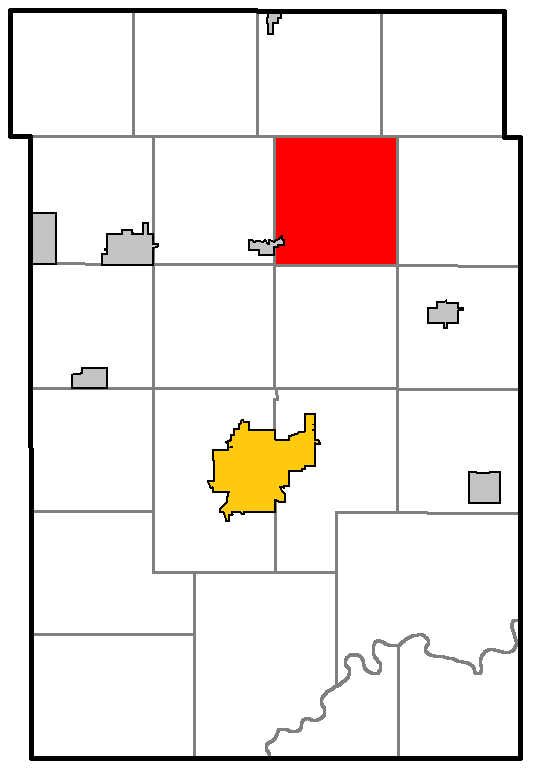
- Location of Otter Creek, within Dunn County

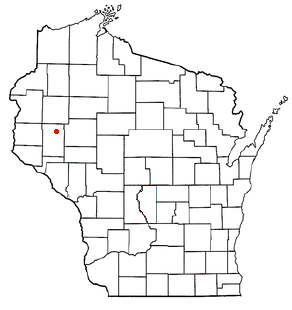
- Location of Otter Creek, Wisconsin
- Coordinates: 45°4′28″N 91°50′4″W
- Country: United States
- State: Wisconsin
- County: Dunn

Area
  - Total: 36.9 sq mi (95.6 km^{2})
  - Land: 36.9 sq mi (95.6 km^{2})
  - Water: 0 sq mi (0.0 km^{2})
- Elevation: 981 ft (299 m)

Population (2020)
  - Total: 498
  - Density: 13.5/sq mi (5.21/km^{2})
- Time zone: UTC-6 (Central (CST))
  - Summer (DST): UTC-5 (CDT)
- Area codes: 715 & 534
- FIPS code: 55-60725
- GNIS feature ID: 1583881
- Website: https://townofottercreek.com/

Otter Creek is a town in Dunn County, Wisconsin, United States. The population was 498 at the 2020 census.

== Geography ==
According to the United States Census Bureau, the town has a total area of 36.9 square miles (95.6 km^{2}), all land.

== Demographics ==
Historical population
Census	Pop.	Note	%±
1990	339		—
2000	474		39.8%
2010	501		5.7%
2020	498		−0.6%

As of the census of 2000, there were 474 people, 166 households, and 132 families residing in the town. The population density was 12.8 people per square mile (5.0/km^{2}). There were 184 housing units at an average density of 5.0 per square mile (1.9/km^{2}). The racial makeup of the town was 98.73% White, 0.21% Native American, 0.84% Asian, and 0.21% from two or more races. Hispanic or Latino of any race were 0.42% of the population.

There were 166 households, out of which 41.0% had children under the age of 18 living with them, 66.9% were married couples living together, 6.0% had a female householder with no husband present, and 19.9% were non-families. 15.7% of all households were made up of individuals, and 4.2% had someone living alone who was 65 years of age or older. The average household size was 2.86 and the average family size was 3.18.

In the town, the population was spread out, with 31.6% under the age of 18, 5.3% from 18 to 24, 29.3% from 25 to 44, 25.9% from 45 to 64, and 7.8% who were 65 years of age or older. The median age was 36 years. For every 100 females, there were 102.6 males. For every 100 females age 18 and over, there were 105.1 males.

The median income for a household in the town was $41,000, and the median income for a family was $43,375. Males had a median income of $30,682 versus $23,250 for females. The per capita income for the town was $16,799. About 2.5% of families and 1.9% of the population were below the poverty line, including none of those under age 18 and 7.1% of those age 65 or over.
