= Otter Creek Township =

Otter Creek Township may refer to:

== Illinois ==
- Otter Creek Township, Jersey County, Illinois
- Otter Creek Township, LaSalle County, Illinois

== Indiana ==
- Otter Creek Township, Ripley County, Indiana
- Otter Creek Township, Vigo County, Indiana

== Iowa ==
- Otter Creek Township, Crawford County, Iowa
- Otter Creek Township, Jackson County, Iowa
- Otter Creek Township, Linn County, Iowa
- Otter Creek Township, Lucas County, Iowa
- Otter Creek Township, Tama County, Iowa

== Kansas ==
- Otter Creek Township, Greenwood County, Kansas

== Nebraska ==
- Ottercreek Township, Dixon County, Nebraska

== North Dakota ==
- Otter Creek Township, Grant County, North Dakota, in Grant County, North Dakota

== Pennsylvania ==
- Otter Creek Township, Pennsylvania
