= Stoco Lake =

Lake in Tweed, Ontario, Canada

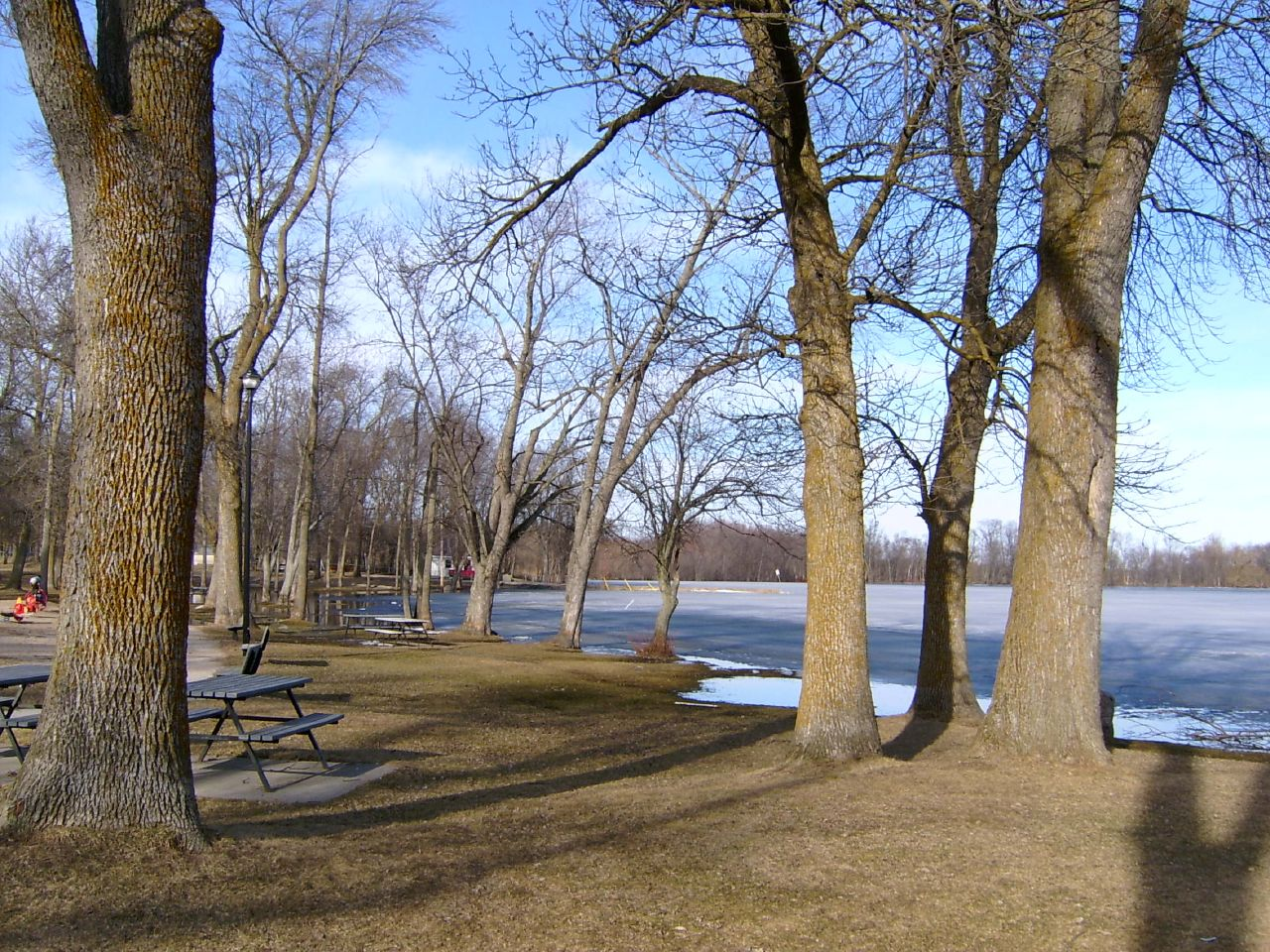
- Stoco Lake (March 2006)

- Location within Ontario
- Location: Tweed, Hastings County, Ontario
- Coordinates: 44°28′30″N 77°17′18″W
- Primary inflows: Moira River, Clare River, Sulphide Creek
- Primary outflows: Moira River
- Basin countries: Canada
- Max. length: 5.4 km (3.4 mi)
- Max. width: 2.5 km (1.6 mi)
- Surface elevation: 138 m (453 ft)
- Islands: Butternut Island, Grant Island
- Settlements: Tweed (village), Cosy Cove, Stoco

Stoco Lake is a lake in the Lake Ontario drainage basin in Tweed, Hastings County, Ontario, Canada.

The lake is about 5.4 kilometres (3.4 mi) long and 2.5 kilometres (1.6 mi) wide, and lies at an elevation of approximately 138 metres (453 ft). There are two named islands, Butternut Island and Grant Island, and one named bay, Cosy Cove at the northeast. The primary inflow is the Moira River, at the northwest. Secondary inflows are the Clare River at the east and Sulphide Creek at Cosy Cove at the northeast. The primary outflow is the Moira River, which exits via two channels: the eastern channel, designated the Moira River, and the named Western Channel. The two enclose Sugar Island. There are three settlements on the lake: the village of Tweed at the Moira River inflow at the northwest; Cosy Cove, on the bay Cosy Cove and at the Sulphide Creek inflow at the northeast; and Stoco at the Moira River eastern channel outflow. The Moira River flows into the Bay of Quinte on Lake Ontario at Belleville.

== See also ==
- List of lakes in Ontario
