= Madoc, Ontario (township) =

Township in Ontario, Canada

Madoc
- Township (lower-tier)
- Township of Madoc
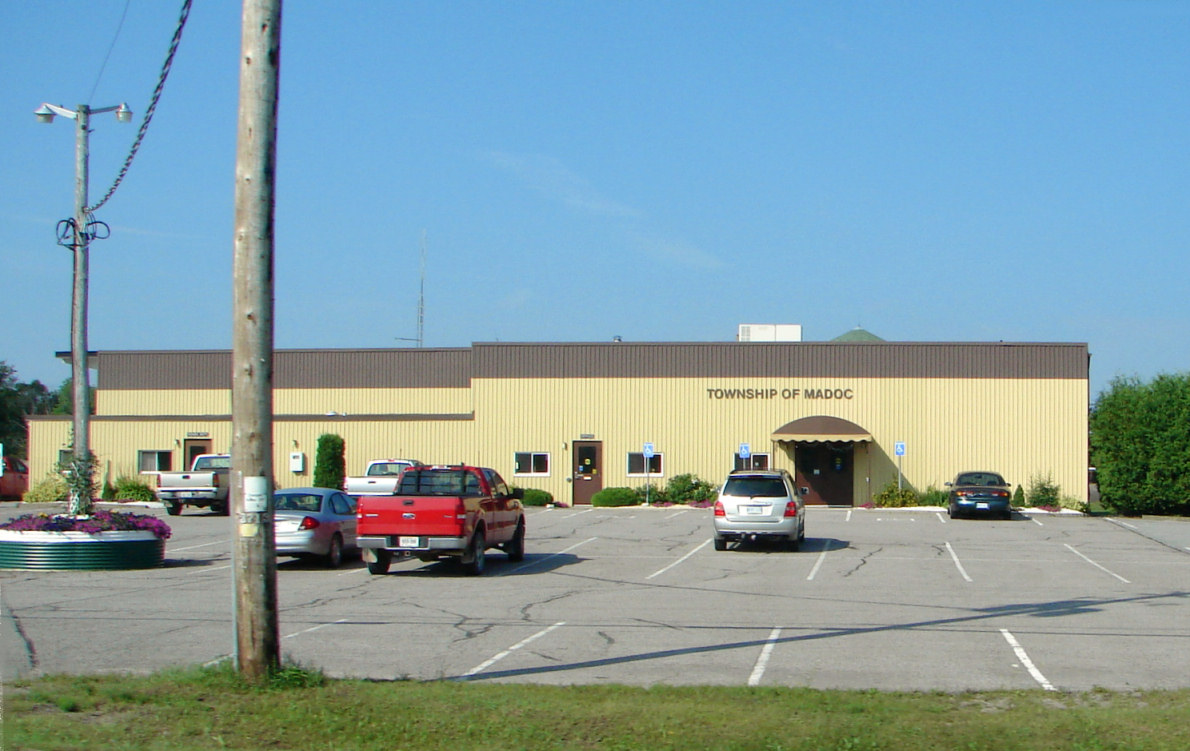
- Municipal office

- Location within Southern Ontario
- Coordinates: 44°35′N 77°31′W
- Country: Canada
- Province: Ontario
- County: Hastings
- Settled: Early 19th century
- Incorporated: 1850

Government
  - Type: Township
  - Reeve: Loyde Blackburn
  - Fed. riding: Hastings—Lennox and Addington—Tyendinaga
  - Prov. riding: Hastings-Lennox and Addington

Area
  - Land: 274.58 km^{2} (106.02 sq mi)

Population (2021)
  - Total: 2,233
  - Density: 8.1/km^{2} (21/sq mi)
- Time zone: UTC-5 (EST)
  - Summer (DST): UTC-4 (EDT)
- Postal Code: K0K 1Y0
- Area codes: 613 and 343
- Website: www.madoc.ca

Madoc is a township in Hastings County in Eastern Ontario, Canada.

The township was named after Welsh prince Madoc ap Owain Gwynedd, credited by some with discovering North America in 1170. There exists an alternative explanation, for which no evidence exists, that the name comes from a small Welsh village, Llanmadoc, on the Gower Peninsula of Wales, not far from the city of Swansea. Its post office dates from 1836.

== Communities ==
The township of Madoc comprises several villages and hamlets, including communities such as Allen, Bannockburn, Cooper, Eldorado, Fox Corners, Hazzards Corners, Keller Bridge, Rimington, and Empey.

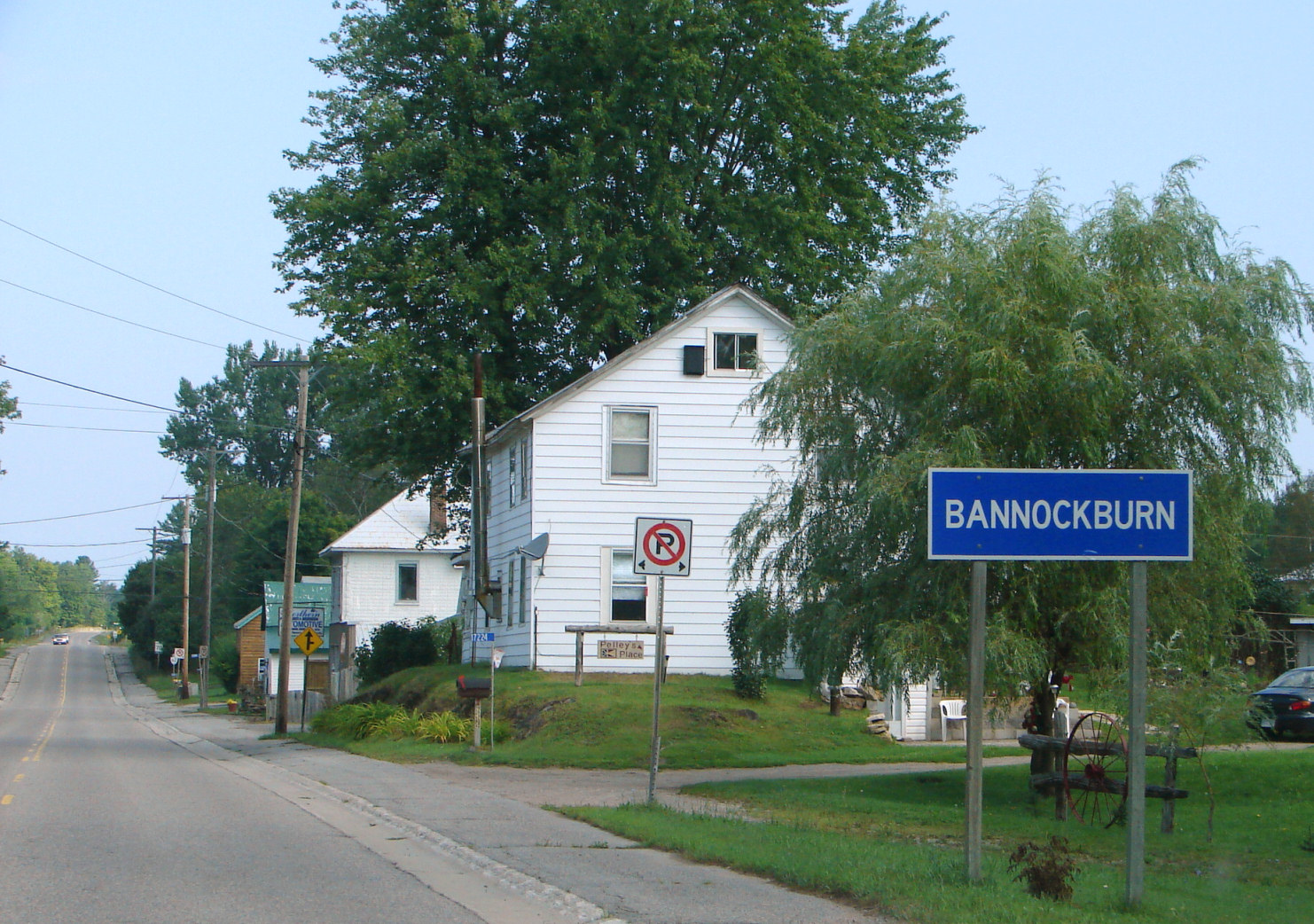
Bannockburn

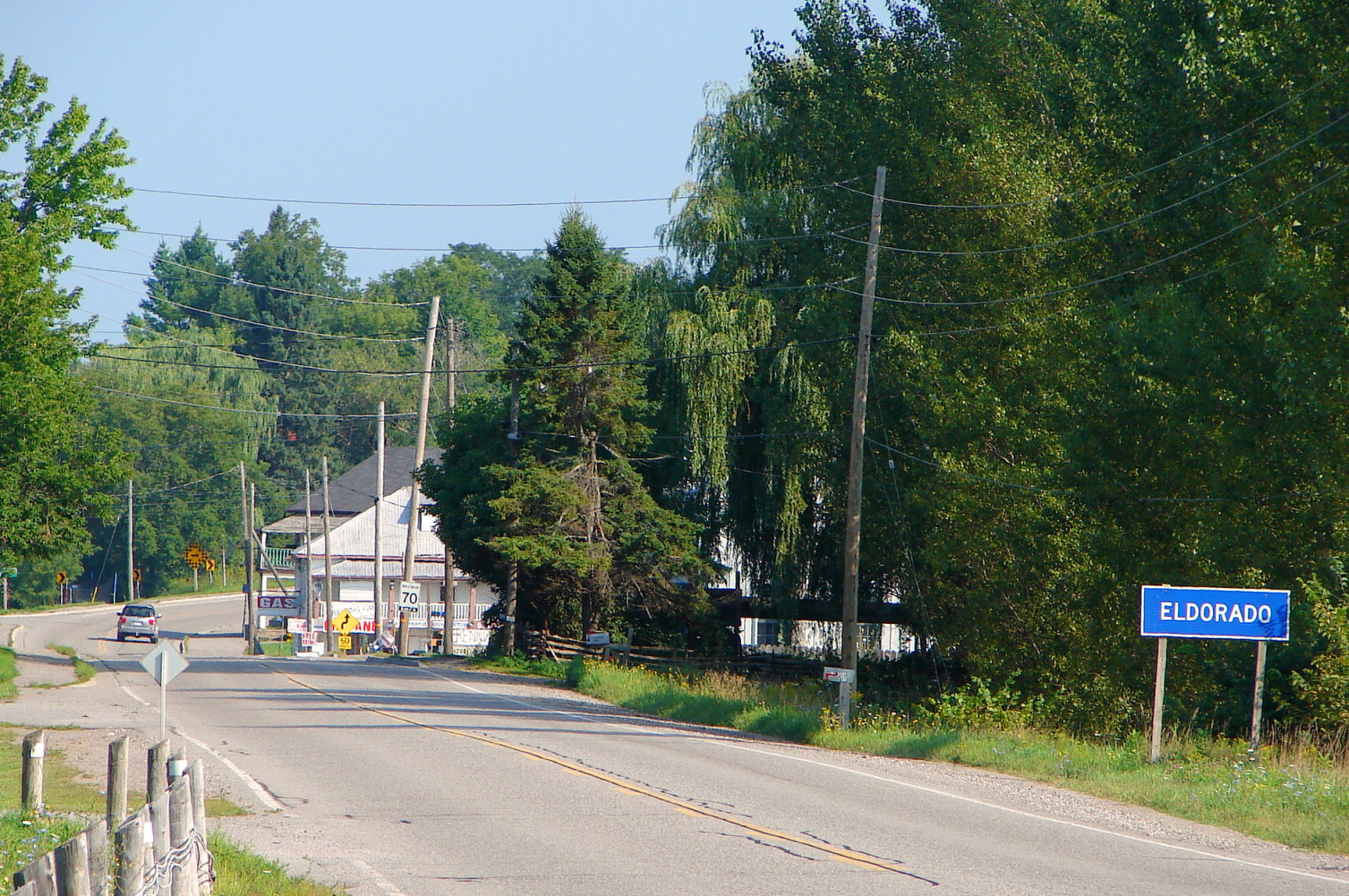
Eldorado

== History ==
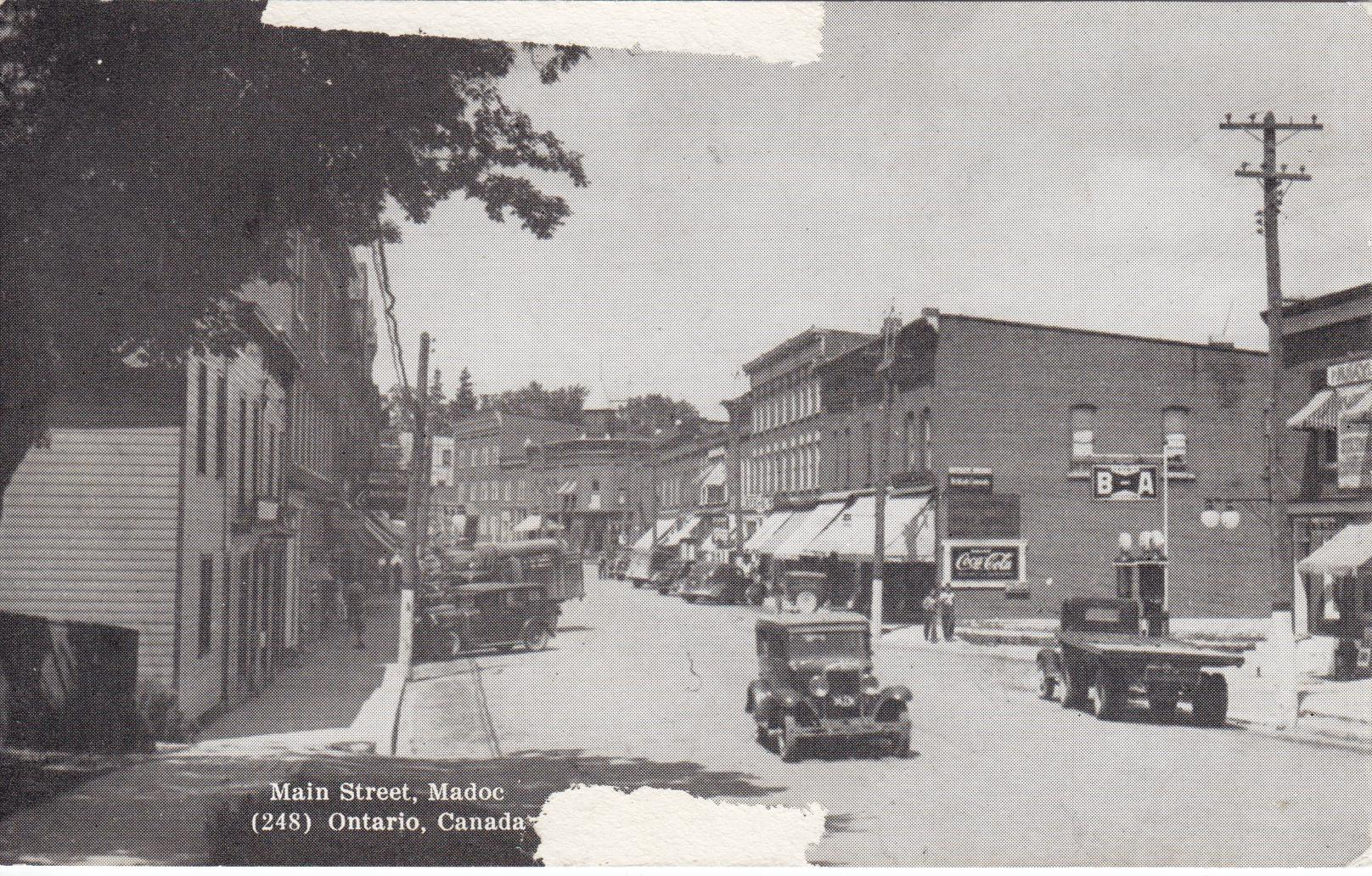
Durham Street in Madoc between Elgin and St. Lawrence streets (1925)

Settlement of the township began around 1830, and it was incorporated on January 1, 1850.

Mills and ironworks gave initial stimulus to the community of Madoc. Following the discovery of gold-bearing quartz in 1866, the community prospered as an industrial centre. In 1877, the community separated from the township and became an incorporated village municipality.

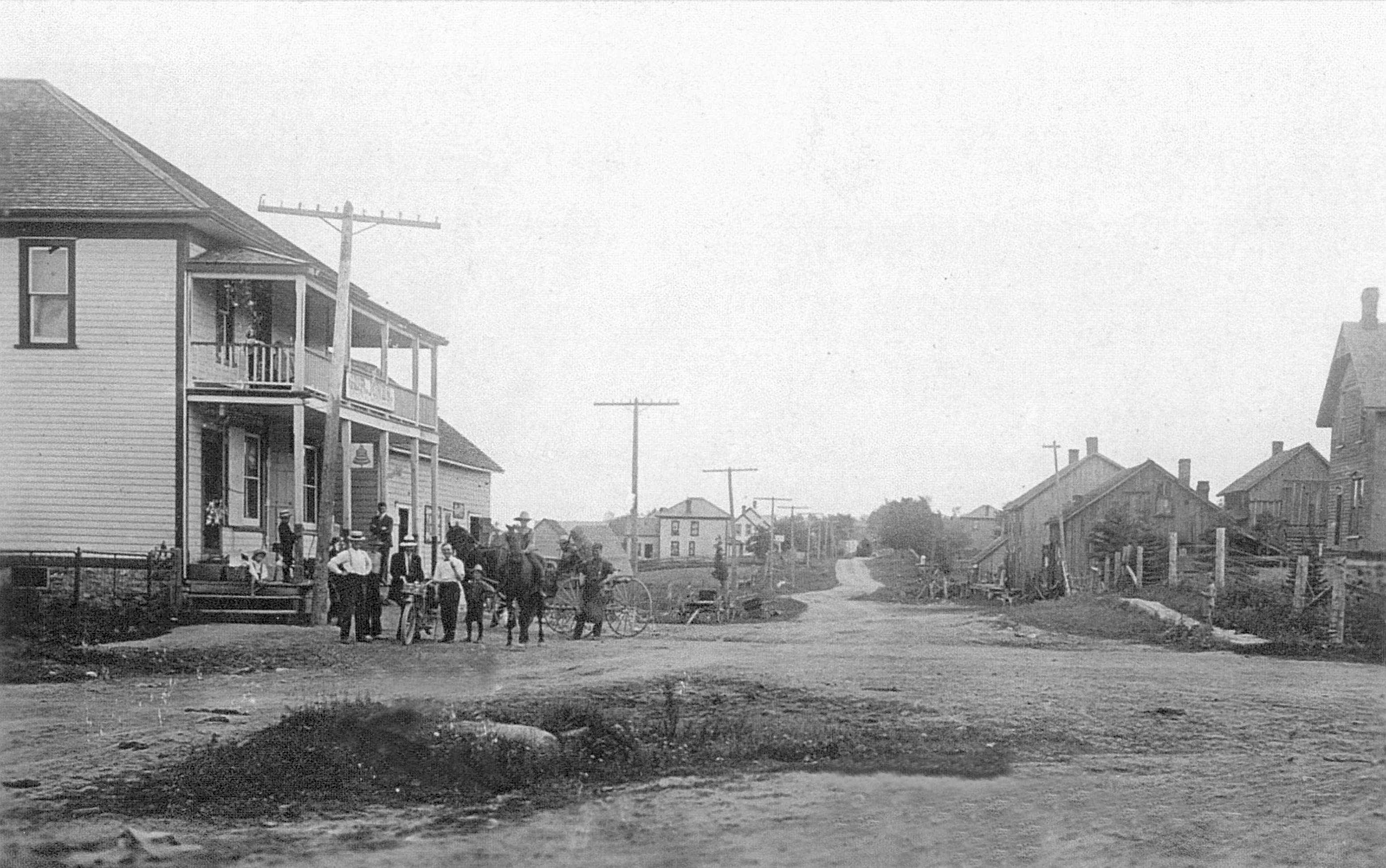
Eldorado (circa 1900)

Eldorado, 9.7 kilometres (6 mi) north of Madoc village, was the site of Ontario's first gold rush on 18 August 1866 by Marcus Powell and William Berryman (or Nicholas Snider). They opened up a limestone cave, 12 feet long, 6 feet wide and 6 feet high. The resultant mine was named the Richardson Mine, after John Richardson, owner of the farm where it was located. People soon came from all over North America to this area.

== Demographics ==
In the 2021 Census of Population conducted by Statistics Canada, Madoc had a population of 2,233 living in 868 of its 934 total private dwellings, a change of 7.5% from its 2016 population of 2,078. With a land area of 274.58 km^{2} (106.02 sq mi), it had a population density of 8.1/km^{2} (21.1/sq mi) in 2021.

Canada census – Madoc community profile

	2021	2016	2011
Population	2,233 (+7.5% from 2016)	2,078 (-5.4% from 2011)	2,197 (6.2% from 2006)
Land area	274.58 km^{2} (106.02 sq mi)	277.97 km^{2} (107.32 sq mi)	277.97 km^{2} (107.32 sq mi)
Population density	8.1/km^{2} (21/sq mi)	7.5/km^{2} (19/sq mi)	7.9/km^{2} (20/sq mi)
Median age	49.6 (M: 49.2, F: 50.0)	49.4 (M: 49.9, F: 48.9)	45.8 (M: 46.0, F: 45.7)
Private dwellings	934 (total) 868 (occupied)	889 (total)	894 (total)
Median household income	$79,000	$63,539

References: 2021 2016 2011

Historical census populations – Madoc, Ontario (township)

Year	Pop.	±%
1871	3,479	—
1881	3,182	−8.5%
1891	2,967	−6.8%
1901	2,790	−6.0%
1911	2,351	−15.7%
1921	2,140	−9.0%
1931	2,024	−5.4%
1941	1,860	−8.1%

Year	Pop.	±%
1951	1,743	−6.3%
1956	1,724	−1.1%
1961	1,697	−1.6%
1966	1,549	−8.7%
1971	1,500	−3.2%
1976	1,538	+2.5%
1981	1,623	+5.5%
1986	1,645	+1.4%

Year	Pop.	±%
1991	1,869	+13.6%
1996	2,031	+8.7%
2001	2,044	+0.6%
2006	2,069	+1.2%
2011	2,197	+6.2%
2016	2,078	−5.4%
2021	2,233	+7.5%

Source: Statistics Canada

== Notable people ==
- Charles Wilson Cross – Canadian politician. First Attorney-General of Alberta (1912–1918)

== See also ==
- List of townships in Ontario
