= Tweed, Ontario (village) =

Tweed
- Unincorporated community
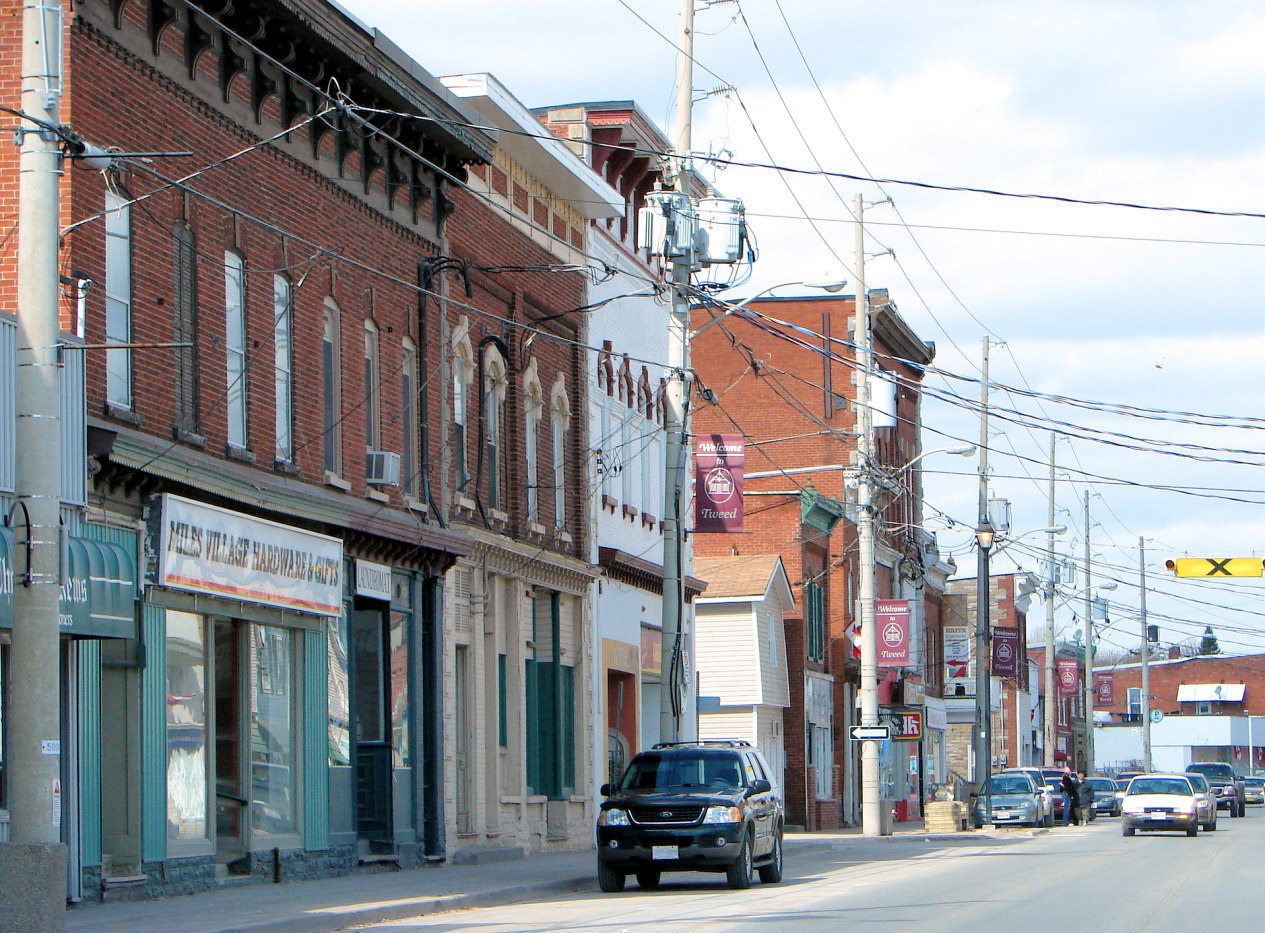
- Main street

- Location within Southern Ontario
- Coordinates: 44°28′30″N 77°18′30″W
- Country: Canada
- Province: Ontario
- County: Hastings
- Municipality: Tweed
- Founded: 1830s
- Incorporated: 1891
- Dissolved (amalgamated): January 1, 1998

Area
  - Land: 2.50 km^{2} (0.97 sq mi)

Population (2021)
  - Total: 1,541
  - Density: 617.3/km^{2} (1,599/sq mi)
- Time zone: UTC-5 (EST)
  - Summer (DST): UTC-4 (EDT)
- Postal code: K0K 2K0
- Area code: 613

Tweed, Ontario is a community on Stoco Lake and the only urban centre of the Municipality of Tweed in Hastings County, central-eastern Ontario, Canada. It had a population of 1,541 in the 2021 census. The principal thoroughfare is Highway 37.

== History ==
Tweed was first settled in the 1830s, originally named Hungerford Mills, after the surrounding township of Hungerford. The settlement was renamed Tweed after the River Tweed in Scotland. The economic development of the community was enabled by lumbering and mining developments during the mid-19th century. Tweed became a service centre for area farmers. It was incorporated as a Village in 1891.

In 1967, Tweed was the site of the first all-women municipal council in Canada.

In 1998, Tweed was amalgamated with the Township of Hungerford and the Township of Elzevir & Grimsthorpe to form the Municipality of Tweed.

=== Select events ===
In 1996 the town made news when resident Presbyterian minister Larry Turner and Russel Moon applied for a CFL team, in an attempt to become the Green Bay of Canada. Had the attempt been successful, the team would have been known as the Tweed Muskies.

In 1989 the Ottawa branch of the Elvis Sighting Society declared Elvis was alive and well and living in Tweed. Since that time, an "Elvis is Alive" festival has been held in July every year. More recently Tweed and Elvis made the headlines when a reporter from the Toronto Sun came to investigate if there was truth to the rumours. The only evidence that remains now that Elvis may have ever been in the community is a very short road now called Elvis Lane. Oddly enough not far from the proposed site of the Tweed Muskies stadium.

Between 2007 and 2009, a series of crimes occurred in Tweed and neighbouring Cosy Cove including 2 sexual assaults, but mainly numerous thefts of women's undergarments and clothing. In February 2010 Jessica Lloyd of nearby Belleville was found dead in Tweed after Russell Williams led police to her body, confessing to her murder, as well as that of Cpl. Marie-France Comeau, a military flight attendant stationed at CFB Trenton, but living in neighboring Brighton. Williams pleaded guilty to all charges on October 18, 2010.

== Demographics ==
Historical census populations – Tweed (Population centre)

Year	Pop.	±%
1901	1,168	—
1911	1,368	+17.1%
1921	1,339	−2.1%
1931	1,271	−5.1%
1941	1,343	+5.7%
1951	1,562	+16.3%
1956	1,634	+4.6%

Year	Pop.	±%
1961	1,791	+9.6%
1966	1,747	−2.5%
1971	1,738	−0.5%
1976	1,648	−5.2%
1981	1,574	−4.5%
1986	1,559	−1.0%
1991	1,626	+4.3%

Year	Pop.	±%
1996	1,572	−3.3%
2001	1,539	−2.1%
2006	1,595	+3.6%
2011	1,614	+1.2%
2016	1,701	+5.4%
2021	1,541	−9.4%

Population counts prior to 1998 are for Tweed (Village).
Source: Statistics Canada

== Transportation ==
The history of Tweed became entwined with the Canadian Pacific Railway when, in 1884, Canadian Pacific (through its indirectly managed subsidiary, the Ontario and Quebec Railway, or O&Q) constructed a line through the village of Tweed. This placed Tweed in between two junctions between the O&Q and other significant rail lines: the Central Ontario Railway (COR), which connected to the O&Q line at Bonarlaw to the west, and the Kingston and Pembroke Railway (K&P), which connected at Sharbot Lake to the east. This positioned the O&Q line as CP's east–west mainline connecting these Eastern Ontario locations with Toronto, and creating valuable connection points for freight brought in from the fully independent COR and K&R lines. In 1889, Tweed became a junction in its own right when the Napanee, Tamworth and Quebec Railway (which would be reorganized under the Bay of Quinte Railway, or BQ, in 1881) was extended north to it. In a final push, BQ would extend their line another 20 miles (32 km) to Bannockburn in 1903, where it crossed the COR before terminating.

Over the next hundred years, the historic short line railways were gradually assimilated into the Canadian Pacific and Canadian National rail conglomerates; CP managed the O&Q as an internal part of the company, and the O&Q itself laid essentially dormant, with the line being referred to internally as the Havelock Subdivision. Meanwhile, the COR was acquired by a succession of interests including the Canadian Northern Railway (CNoR) in 1911, which was nationalized in 1918 and merged into Canadian National in 1923; thereafter, the COR became CN's Maynooth Subdivision. After the K&P encountered financial difficulties, Canadian Pacific negotiated a lease for the entire company and line in 1912, which ended the K&P as a legal entity and turned it into CP's Kingston Subdivision (not to be confused with the CN Kingston Subdivision). Finally, the Bay of Quinte Railway also became a part of CN, but was gradually abandoned, starting with the Tweed to Bannockburn section in 1935, then the Tweed to Yarker section in 1941, thus ending Tweed's nearly 50-year history as a rail junction.

The problems with the O&Q came to a head in the early 1970s as CP began to quietly sell off the company's assets and pursue abandonment of sections of the line. In the midst of a $422 million lawsuit with the company's minority shareholders over the profits from sell-off of the company's assets, CP abandoned the section from Glen Tay to Tweed, thus making Tweed the end of the line. Legal proceedings at a provincial level stretched from 1977 to 1978, when the Ontario Supreme Court ruled that CP had acted illegally in its management of the company, including abandonment of sections of the line over several decades, and that CP had violated the terms of its lease, which required it to "efficiently work, maintain and keep in good order and repair, the said railway and the rolling stock and appurtances ... and all the property hereby demised." Canadian Pacific continued the legal battle and, in 1987, won its appeal to the Supreme Court of Canada. In the same year, it abandoned the Havelock to Tweed section, ending its hundred-year presence in the village of Tweed.

In the late 2010s, Via Rail began to promote the idea of high-frequency rail (HFR), which would potentially bring passenger rail service to Tweed again. Via's HFR plan is currently not finalized.

== Notable people ==
- Former Chief Justice of the Ontario Superior Court of Justice Patrick Lesage was born in Tweed.
- Michael Ondaatje has a holiday house in the area.
- Jack Vance, Vice Chief of the Defence Staff, who died in Tweed in 2013.
