= Tweed, Ontario =

Tweed
- Municipality (lower-tier)
- Municipality of Tweed
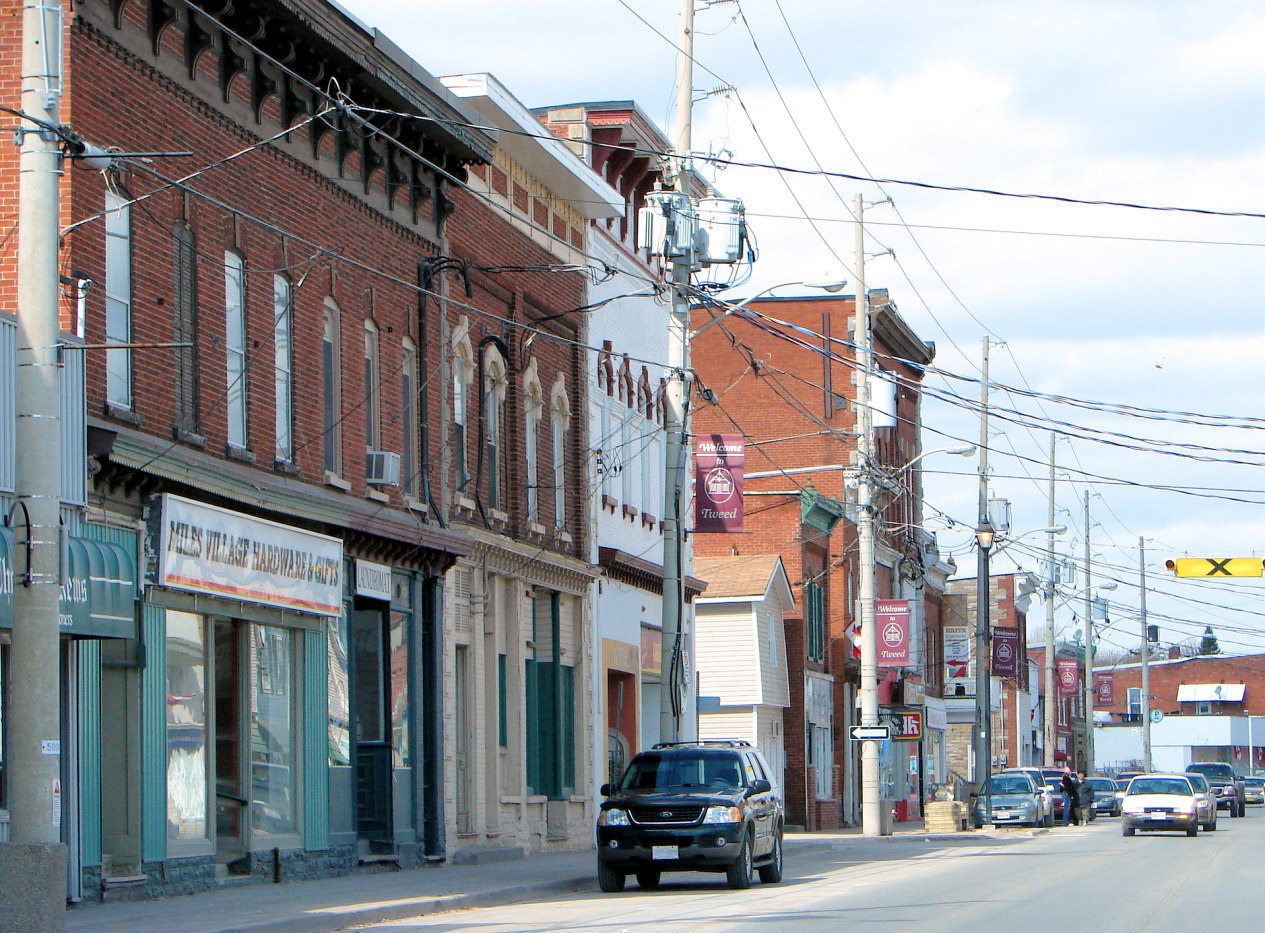
- Main street in Tweed

- Location within Hastings County Location within Southern Ontario
- Coordinates: 44°28′29″N 77°18′37″W
- Country: Canada
- Province: Ontario
- County: Hastings
- Incorporated: January 1, 1998

Government
  - Type: Municipality
  - Mayor: Jamie DeMarsh
  - Fed. riding: Hastings—Lennox and Addington—Tyendinaga
  - Prov. riding: Hastings—Lennox and Addington

Area
  - Land: 918.61 km^{2} (354.68 sq mi)
  - Urban: 2.50 km^{2} (0.97 sq mi)
- Elevation: 145 m (475 ft)

Population (2021)
  - Total: 6,067
  - Density: 6.6/km^{2} (17/sq mi)
  - Urban: 1,541
  - Urban density: 617.3/km^{2} (1,599/sq mi)
- Time zone: UTC-5 (EST)
  - Summer (DST): UTC-4 (EDT)
- Postal Code: K0K
- Area code: 613
- Website: twp.tweed.on.ca

Tweed is a municipality located in central-eastern Ontario, Canada, in Hastings County.

The Municipality of Tweed is an amalgamated municipality comprising the former Village of Tweed and the former Hungerford Township and former Elzevir & Grimsthorpe Townships. The Municipality was incorporated on 1 January 1998 as a lower-tier municipality within the County of Hastings two-tier governing system.

== History ==
=== 19th and 20th century ===
The post office was established in 1852.

Elzevir Township (formed circa 1869, location of a major gold strike) and Grimsthorpe Township (formed 22 February 1867 during the local gold rush) had been administered as one entity since before 1968 until amalgamation into the Municipality of Tweed.

The Napanee, Tamworth and Quebec Railway (later the Bay of Quinte Railway) had a spur from Tamworth, Ontario to Tweed; the Tweed-Yarker and Tweed-Bannockburn segments were abandoned by 1941 and the former Napanee-Smiths Falls mainline abandoned in the late 1970s. From the 1880s, the Canadian Pacific Railway's Havelock Subdivision passed through Tweed to Glen Tay and Smith Falls. The line was abandoned from Glen Tay to Tweed in 1973 then Tweed to Havelock in 1987. A more westerly portion of the line still runs through Peterborough.

=== 21st century ===
Tweed made national news in 2010 when Colonel Russell Williams, a resident of Ottawa who had a cottage in Tweed, was arrested and accused of the murders of Jessica Lloyd and Corporal Marie-France Comeau. Williams was convicted in 2010 and received two life sentences for the first-degree murders. Williams is in prison in Port-Cartier, Quebec.

On December 14, 2017, a Hydro One helicopter working on a row of transmission towers crashed northeast of Tweed. All 4 people on board, the pilot and three electrical workers, were killed.

Tweedsmuir Hotel (when it was the Huyck's Hotel)

On March 10, 2021, a fire destroyed the landmark Tweedsmuir Hotel. Built in 1886 the hotel had many names and owners but was always a cornerstone of the community.

== Geography ==
As of 2004, the total land area was approximately 230,000 acres (930 km^{2}), 30% of which was Crown land. Lakes, rivers and streams account for approximately 4,650 acres (18.8 km^{2}). There are approximately 600 kilometres (370 mi) of roads throughout the Municipality. The total 2004 property assessment for the Municipality of Tweed was $309,000,000. Its composition was 84% residential, 7% farm, 6% commercial and industrial, and 3% other categories.

Immediately east of the Village of Tweed is Stoco Lake, home to a popular and uncommon sport-fish, the muskellunge or Muskie (Esox masquinongy). Stoco Lake is a part of the Moira River system; the Black River joins the Moira River near the Village of Tweed.

=== Communities ===
Besides the village proper of Tweed, the Municipality of Tweed comprises a number of villages and hamlets, including the following communities:

- Actinolite
- Bogart
- Buller
- Chapman
- Cosy Cove
- Coulters Hill
- Duff Corners
- East Hungerford (44.502°N 77.151°W)
- Elzevir
- Farrell Corners (44.452°N 77.134°W)
- Hungerford
- Larkins
- Lime Lake
- Lodgeroom Corners
- Lost Channel (44.419°N 77.316°W)
- Marlbank
- Moneymore
- Otter Creek
- Queensborough
- Stoco
- Sulphide
- Thomasburg (44.388961°N 77.345896°W)

Approximately 30% of the population resides in the Village of Tweed, the only urban centre. The remainder of the Municipality of Tweed consists of a large rural area which reaches from Wadsworth Lake in the north to Roslin in the south. The Municipality of Tweeds has five hamlets: (Actinolite, Marlbank, Queensborough, Stoco, and Thomasburg). The residents of the hamlets and the rural area comprise the other 70% of the population. In 2004, there were approximately 2870 households.

== Demographics ==
In the 2021 Census of Population conducted by Statistics Canada, Tweed had a population of 6,067 living in 2,591 of its 3,042 total private dwellings, a change of 0.4% from its 2016 population of 6,044. With a land area of 918.61 km^{2} (354.68 sq mi), it had a population density of 6.6/km^{2} (17.1/sq mi) in 2021.

Canada census – Tweed, Ontario community profile

	2021	2016	2011
Population	6,067 (+0.4% from 2016)	6044 (-0.2% from 2011)	6057 (7.9% from 2006)
Land area	918.61 km^{2} (354.68 sq mi)	953.47 km^{2} (368.14 sq mi)	953.75 km^{2} (368.24 sq mi)
Population density	6.6/km^{2} (17/sq mi)	6.3/km^{2} (16/sq mi)	6.4/km^{2} (17/sq mi)
Median age	53.6 (M: 53.6, F: 53.6)	51.3 (M: 51.1, F: 51.5)	48.7 (M: 48.0, F: 49.4)
Private dwellings	3,042 (total) 2,591 (occupied)	3023 (total)	2907 (total)
Median household income	$69,000	$54,549

References: 2021 2016 2011

Historical census populations – Tweed, Ontario

Year	Pop.	±%
1996	5,706	—
2001	5,612	−1.6%
2006	5,614	+0.0%

Year	Pop.	±%
2011	6,057	+7.9%
2016	6,044	−0.2%
2021	6,067	+0.4%

Population counts are not adjusted for boundary changes.
Source: Statistics Canada

Populations prior to amalgamation (1998):

- Total Population in 1996: 5,706
  - Elzevir and Grimsthorpe township: 854
  - Hungerford township: 3,280
  - Tweed village: 1,572
- Population in 1991:
  - Elzevir and Grimsthorpe township: 781
  - Hungerford township: 3,085
  - Tweed village: 1,626

Mother tongue (2021):

- English as first language: 94.9%
- French as first language: 1.3%
- English and French as first language: 0.3%
- Other as first language: 3.1%

== Forest fire protection history ==
The Tweed Forest Fire District was founded by the former Ontario Department of Lands and Forests (now the MNR) in 1922 as one of 17 districts to help protect Ontario's forests from fire by early detection from fire towers. The headquarters for the district were housed at Hungerford Road in town. It was the central headquarters for 21 fire lookout towers. When a fire was spotted in the forest a towerman would get the degree bearings from his respective tower and radio back the information to headquarters. When one or more towermen from other towers in the area would also call in their bearings, the forest rangers at headquarters could get a 'triangulation' read and plot the exact location of the fire on their map. This way a team of forest firefighters could be dispatched as soon as possible to get the fire under control. In 1958 the 100-foot (30 m)-tall Hungerford firetower was erected beside the station. However, in the 1970s all the towers had been decommissioned as aerial firefighting techniques were employed. The Hungerford tower was disassembled in 1996 and placed behind the Tweed Heritage Centre.

== See also ==
- List of townships in Ontario
