= Tudor and Cashel =

- Township (lower-tier)
- Township of Tudor and Cashel
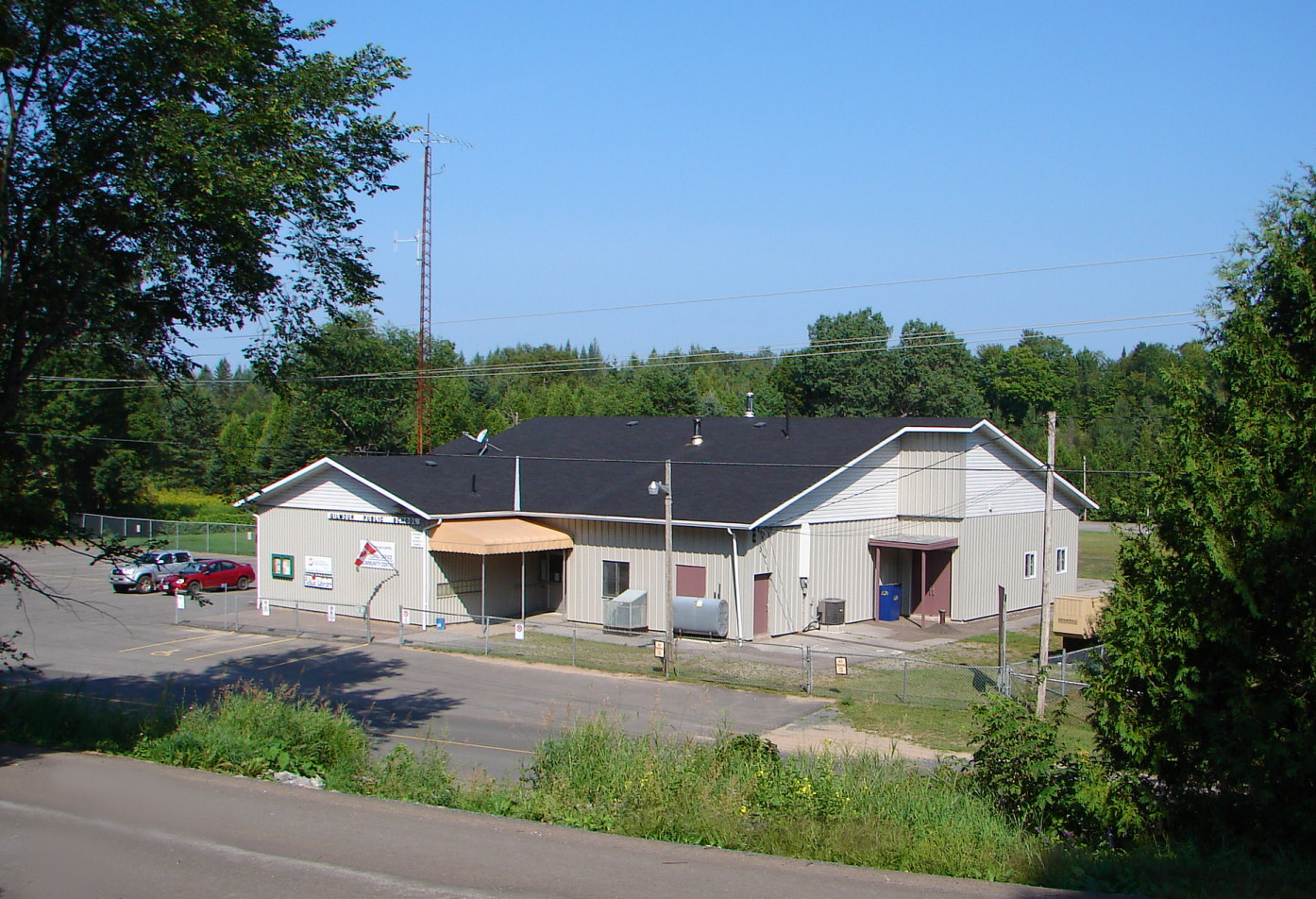
- Municipal office in Gilmour

- Location within Southern Ontario
- Coordinates: 44°45′N 77°36′W
- Country: Canada
- Province: Ontario
- County: Hastings
- Incorporated: 1869

Government
  - Type: Township under a mayoral-council system
  - Mayor: Dave Hederson
  - Federal riding: Hastings—Lennox and Addington—Tyendinaga
  - Prov. riding: Hastings—Lennox and Addington

Area
  - Land: 433.31 km^{2} (167.30 sq mi)

Population (2021)
  - Total: 740
  - Density: 1.7/km^{2} (4.4/sq mi)
- Time zone: UTC-5 (EST)
  - Summer (DST): UTC-4 (EDT)
- Postal Code: K0L 1W0
- Area codes: 613 and 343
- Website: www.tudorandcashel.com

Tudor and Cashel is a township in the Canadian province of Ontario, located in Hastings County.

The township consists of two non-contiguous portions, separated by Limerick township and the northernmost portion of Tweed.The municipality is mostly rural.

== History ==
Tudor Township was created circa 1865. Cashel Township was created circa 1869. Tudor and Cashel Townships were administered as one in 1897.

Limerick Township and Wollaston Township petitioned unsuccessfully for separation from Tudor Township in 1868. Wollaston Township was eventually formed circa 1880. Limerick Township was eventually formed in 1887 between today's Tudor and Cashel Townships. Geologically Limerick Township and Tudor Township are very similar, with valuable mineral resources.

After the separation of old Limerick Township, the townships of Tudor and Cashel were geographically separated since Limerick abutted along a corner of old Grimsthorpe Township (which was later amalgamated into the Municipality of Tweed).

== Communities ==
- Gilmour (44.817°N 77.617°W)
- Glanmire (44°45′05″N 77°40′55″W), ghost town
- Gunter (44°52′53″N 77°32′40″W)
- Millbridge (44°41.5′N 77°36′W), ghost town
- Millbridge Station (44°42′54″N 77°35′56″W), ghost town

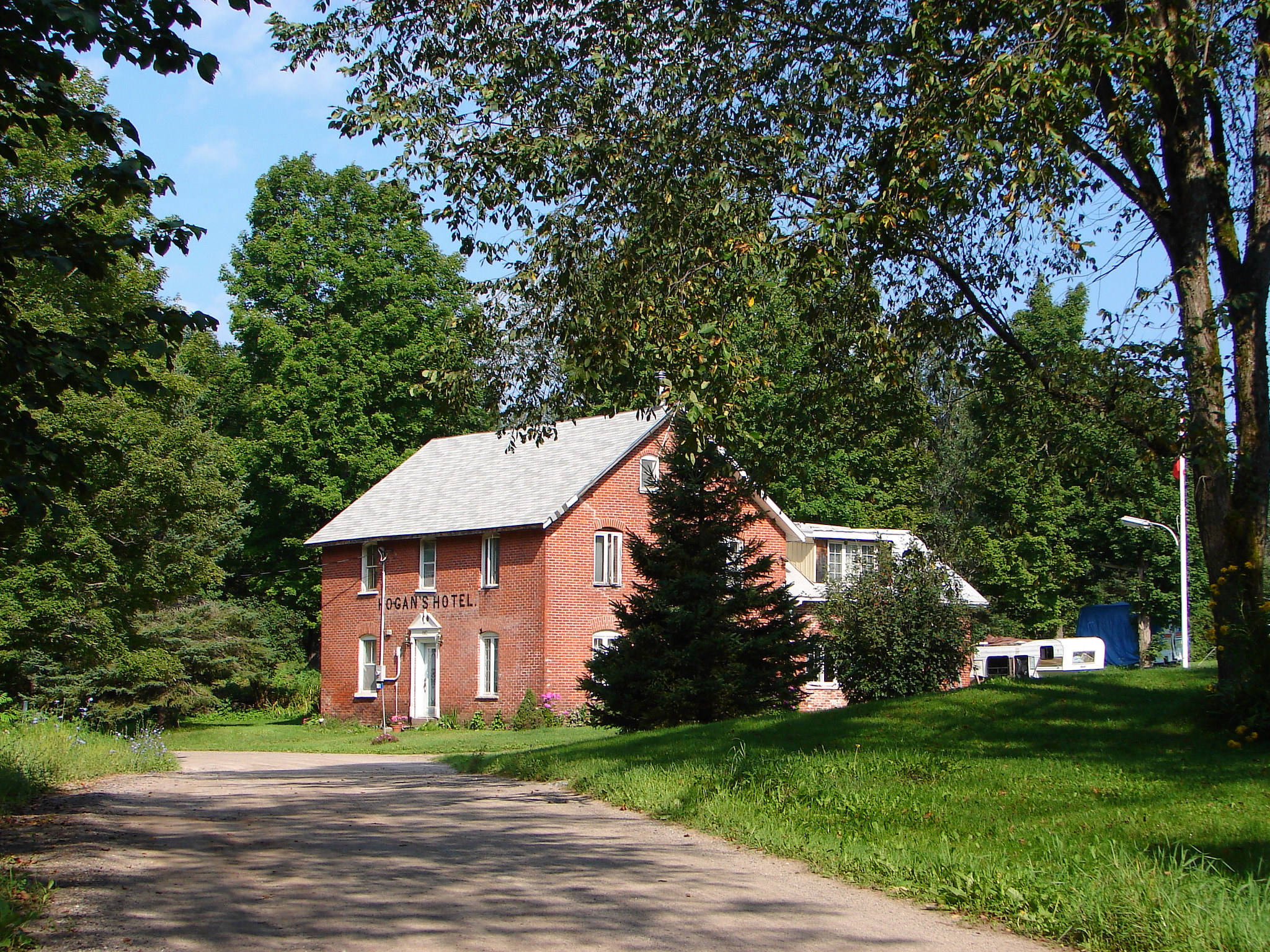
Millbridge Station

== Demographics ==
In the 2021 Census of Population conducted by Statistics Canada, Tudor and Cashel had a population of 740 living in 352 of its 758 total private dwellings, a change of 26.3% from its 2016 population of 586. With a land area of 433.31 km^{2} (167.30 sq mi), it had a population density of 1.7/km^{2} (4.4/sq mi) in 2021.

Canada census – Tudor and Cashel community profile

	2021	2016	2011
Population	740 (+26.3% from 2016)	586 (0.0% from 2011)	586 (-14.1% from 2006)
Land area	433.31 km^{2} (167.30 sq mi)	445.66 km^{2} (172.07 sq mi)	445.67 km^{2} (172.07 sq mi)
Population density	1.7/km^{2} (4.4/sq mi)	1.3/km^{2} (3.4/sq mi)	1.3/km^{2} (3.4/sq mi)
Median age	57.2 (M: 57.2, F: 57.6)	53.0 (M: 52.3, F: 53.7)
Private dwellings	758 (total) 352 (occupied)	768 (total) 268 (occupied)	675 (total)
Median household income	$61,600	$45,952

References: 2021 2016 2011

Historical census populations

Year	Pop.	±%
1921	679	—
1931	571	−15.9%
1941	618	+8.2%
1951	567	−8.3%
1956	592	+4.4%
1961	568	−4.1%

Year	Pop.	±%
1966	504	−11.3%
1971	488	−3.2%
1976	522	+7.0%
1981	481	−7.9%
1986	483	+0.4%
1991	591	+22.4%

Year	Pop.	±%
1996	696	+17.8%
2001	665	−4.5%
2006	682	+2.6%
2011	586	−14.1%
2016	586	+0.0%
2021	740	+26.3%

Source: Statistics Canada

Mother tongue (2021):

- English as first language: 92.6%
- French as first language: 0.7%
- English and French as first language: 0.7%
- Other as first language: 6.1%

== See also ==
- List of townships in Ontario
