= Moira River =

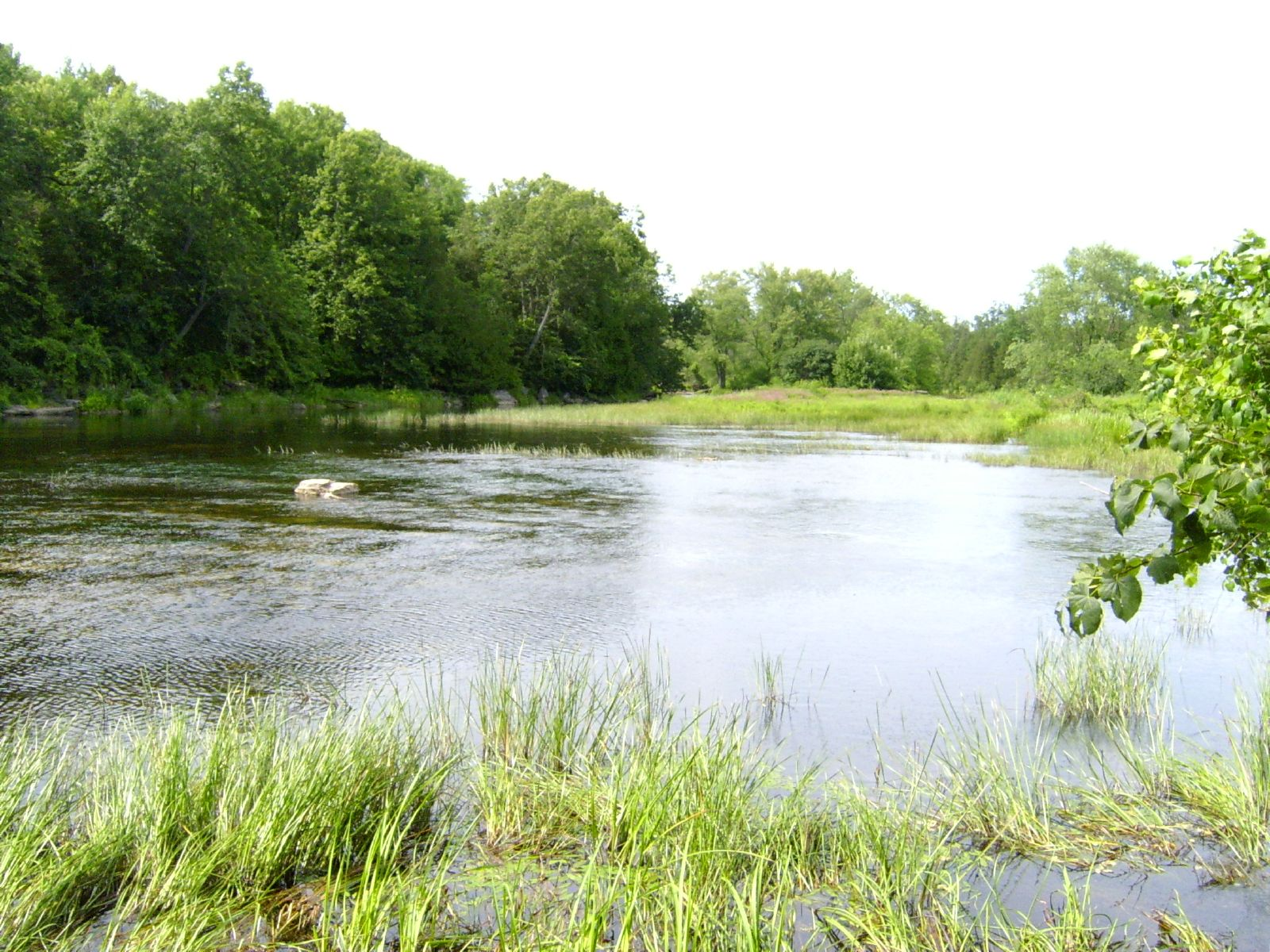
- Moira River on a warm afternoon
- Etymology: Named after Francis Rawdon-Hastings, Earl of Moira

Location
- Country: Canada
- Province: Ontario
- Region: Central Ontario
- County: Hastings

Physical characteristics
- Source: Gunter
  - location: Tudor and Cashel
  - coordinates: 44°52′58″N 77°31′50″W
  - elevation: 360 m (1,180 ft)
- Mouth: Bay of Quinte
  - location: Belleville
  - coordinates: 44°09′36″N 77°23′02″W
  - elevation: 74.1 m (243 ft)
- Length: 98 km (61 mi)

Basin features
- River system: Lake Ontario drainage basin
- Tributaries
  - left: Palliser Creek, Chrysal Creek, Parks Creek, Clare River, Sulphide Creek, Skootamatta River, Black River, Madoc Creek
  - right: Gawley Creek, Jordan River

The Moira River is a river in Hastings County in eastern Ontario, Canada. It travels from its source in the centre of the county to the Bay of Quinte at the county seat Belleville .

== Name ==
Originally named the Sagonaska River by the indigenous peoples of the area, the river was renamed in 1807 by the British colonial government (Upper Canada) after Francis Rawdon-Hastings, Earl of Moira. Rawdon-Hastings fought in the American Revolutionary War and had a political career in England, but has no connection with the site. The name Sagonaska continues to be used in the Belleville area, as the name of a bridge over the Moira, and the name of a public school.

== Course ==
The Moira River begins at an unnamed lake in the more northern Tudor geographic township portion of the municipality of Tudor and Cashel at an elevation of 303 metres (994 ft). It flows south into the township of Madoc, passes through Wolf Lake at an elevation of 276 metres (906 ft), is crossed by Highway 62, and takes in the right tributary Jordan River at the settlement of Bannockburn, before heading south. The river loops east then back west under the highway at Keller Bridge and continues south to the west of Eldorado. The river takes a sharp turn west, before taking in the right tributary Gawley Creek and heading south again at Malone in the municipality of Marmora and Lake. It passes through Deloro Lake and over the Deloro Dam at Deloro at an elevation of 200 metres (656 ft), and is crossed by Highway 7. The Moira then heads east, enters the township of Stirling-Rawdon, and empties into Bend Bay on Moira Lake at an elevation of 154 metres (505 ft), south of the community of Madoc, where it takes in the left tributary Madoc Creek. The river continues east from the lake, enters the municipality of Tweed and takes in the left tributaries Black River and Skootamatta River. It then heads south through the village of Tweed, Ontario into Stoco Lake at an elevation of 138 metres (453 ft), where it takes in the left tributaries Sulphide Creek and Clare River. The river leaves the lake via two channels, an eastern channel Moira River and the named West Channel, which enclose Sugar Island. It heads southwest, and is paralleled by Highway 37 from Tweed all the way to Belleville. The river flows past Chisholm's lumber Mills, through the northwest corner of the township of Tyendinaga and enters the city of Belleville, continuing southeast. It takes in the right tributaries Chrysal Creek and Palliser Creek, flows over the Belleville Yardmen Dam through the former Laziers Dam Site, the McLeod Dam and the Lott Dam and reaches its mouth at the Bay of Quinte, Lake Ontario.

== Watershed ==
While the Moira river itself is entirely within Hastings County, the watershed includes parts of the next two counties to the east, Lennox and Addington (one east) and Frontenac (two east). Tributaries of the Clare River extend into the township of Central Frontenac in Frontenac County. The Clare River also is in the townships of Stone Mills and Addington Highlands in Lennox and Addington County. The Skootamatta River and tributitaries flow through Addington Highlands as well. The tributaries also extend further north in Hastings County than the Moira itself. For example, Partridge Creek in the Skootamatta system extends past Upper Partridge Lake to 44° 57′ 28″ North in the more northerly Cashel portion of the township of Tudor and Cashel.

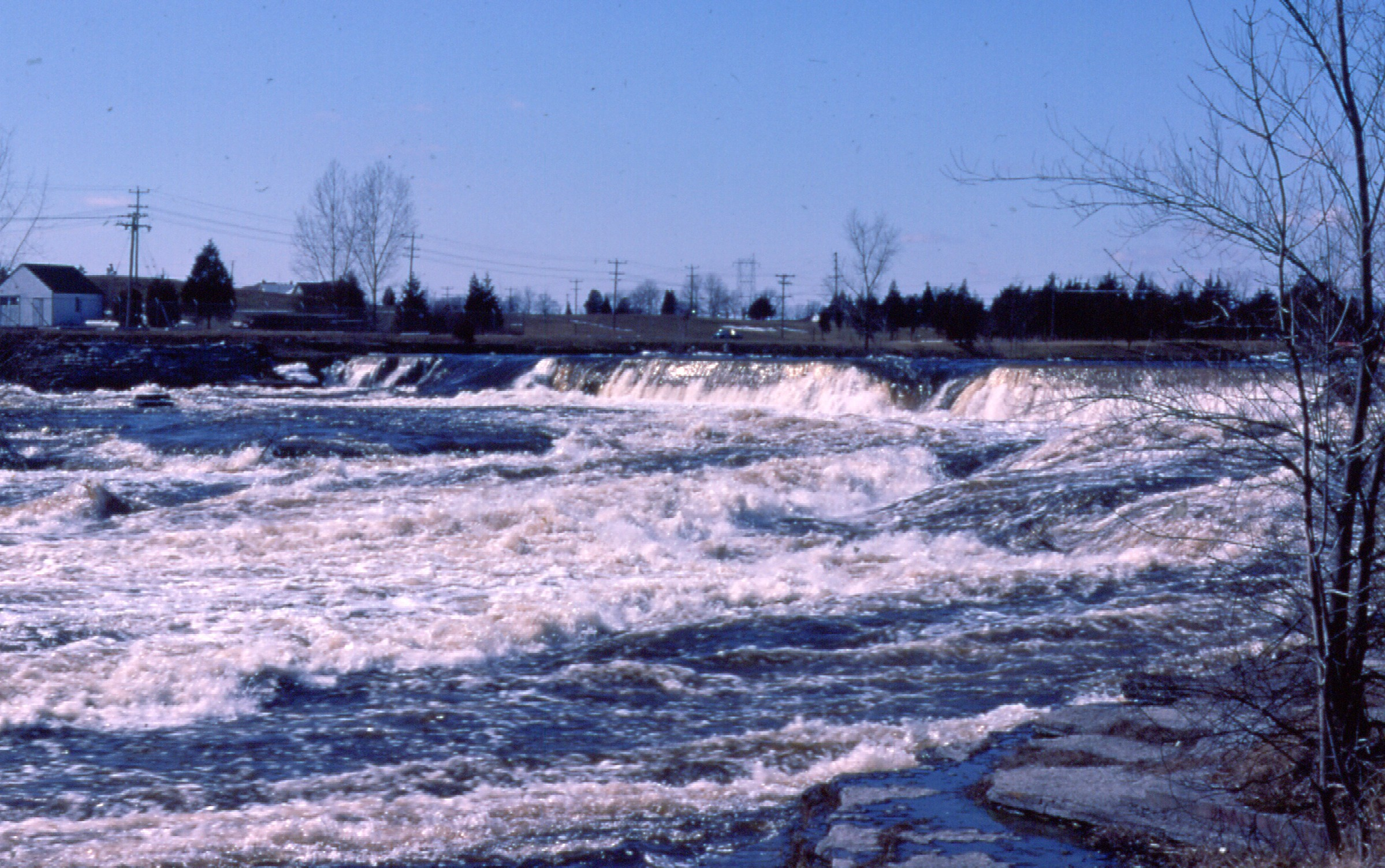
Spring run-off on the Moira River, March 1975

== Tributaries ==
- Palliser Creek (right)
- Chrysal Creek (right)
- Clare River (left)
- Sulphide Creek (left)
- Skootamatta River (left)
- Black River (left)
- Madoc Creek (left)
- Gawley Creek (right)
- Jordan River (right)

== See also ==
- List of rivers of Ontario

== Sources ==
- "Moira River". Geographical Names Data Base. Natural Resources Canada.
- "Toporama - Topographic Map Sheets 31C3, 31C5, 31C6, 31C11, 31C12, 31C13, 31C14". Atlas of Canada. Natural Resources Canada.
- Smith, Donald B. (2013). Mississauga Portraits: Ojibwe Voices from Nineteenth-century Canada. University of Toronto Press. ISBN 9780802094278.
