= Hastings County Board of Education =

Hastings County Board of Education (HCBE) was a school district in Ontario, Canada, serving Hastings County. Its headquarters were in the Education Centre in Belleville.

The territory included the cities of Belleville, and Trenton, the towns of Bancroft and Deseronto, and Frankford, Marmora, Madoc, Stirling, and Tweed villages.

Its territory is now within the Hastings & Prince Edward District School Board.

== Schools ==
=== Secondary schools ===
- Bayside Secondary School (Belleville)
- Centennial Secondary School (Belleville)
- Centre Hastings Secondary School (Madoc)
- Moira Secondary school (Belleville)
- North Hastings High School (Bancroft)
- Quinte Secondary School (Closed 2018) (Belleville)
- Trenton High School (Trenton)
- École Secondaire Marc-Garneau (Trenton)

=== Elementary schools ===
- JK-8:
  - Bayside Public School (Belleville)
  - Breadner Public School (Trenton)
  - Harry J. Clarke Public School (Belleville)
  - College Street Public School (Trenton)
  - Deseronto Public School (Deseronto)
  - Foxboro Public School (Foxboro)
  - Frankford Public School (Frankford)
  - Harmony Public School (Corbyville)
  - Susanna Moodie Public School (Belleville)
  - Park Dale Public School (Belleville)
  - Prince Charles Public School (Trenton)
  - Prince of Wales Public School (Belleville)
  - Queen Elizabeth Public School (Belleville)
  - Queen Elizabeth Public School (Trenton)
  - Tyendinega Public School (Shannonville)
- 4-8:
  - Marmora Senior Public School (Marmora)
  - Tweed Hungerford Public School (Tweed)
- 6-8:
  - Sir Mackenzie Bowell Public School (Belleville)
  - Stirling Senior Public School (Stirling)
- 7-8:
  - North Hastings Senior Elementary School (Bancroft)
- JK-6:
  - Bancroft Public School (Bancroft)
  - Bird's Creek Public School (Bancroft)
  - V.P. Carswell Public School (Trenton)
  - Coe Hill Public School (Coe Hill)
  - École Cité-Jeunesse (Trenton)
  - Hermon Public School (Bancroft)
  - Hillcrest Public School (Belleville)
  - Sir John A. Macdonald Public School (Belleville)
  - Madoc Public School (Madoc)
  - Madoc Township Public School (Madoc Township)
  - Maynooth Public School (Maynooth)
  - North Trenton Public School (Trenton)
  - Paudash Public School (Bancroft)
  - Queen Victoria Public School (Belleville)
- JK-5:
  - Prince Charles Public School (Belleville)
- 2-5:
  - Stirling Junior Public School (Stirling)
- JK-3:
  - S.H. Connor Public School (Tweed)
  - Earl Prentice Public School (Marmora)
- JK-1:
  - Stirling Primary Public School (Stirling)
- DH
  - William R. Kirk (Belleville)
