= Central Ontario Secondary Schools Association =

School athletic association in Canada

Central Ontario Secondary Schools Association is a high school athletic association in Ontario, Canada. It is a member of the Ontario Federation of School Athletic Associations.

== Sports offered ==
Fall	Winter	Spring
Basketball	Alpine Skiing	Badminton
Cross Country	Curling	Baseball
Field Hockey	Hockey (boys' and girls')	Basketball (boys')
Football	Nordic Skiing	Field Lacrosse (boys')
Golf	Snowboarding	Gymnastics
Soccer (Boys')	Swimming	Tennis
Rugby (Girls')	Volleyball (girls')	Track and Field
	Wrestling	

== Member schools and classifications ==
=== Kawartha ===
School	Number	Classification
Adam Scott	957	AAA
Brock	488	A
Campbellford	586	AA
Cobourg East	696	AA
Cobourg West	595	AA
Crestwood	891	AA
Fenelon Falls	822	AA
Haliburton	565	AA
Holy Cross	745	AA
IE Weldon	1184	AAA
Kenner	702	AA
Lakefield	423	A
Lindsay	858	AA
Norwood	348	A
Port Hope	507	A
St. Mary's	814	AA
St. Peter's	1173	AAA
St. Thomas Aquinas	405	A
Thomas A Stewart	1016	AAA

=== Bay of Quinte ===
School	Number	Classification
Bayfield	59	A
Bayside	833	AA
Centre Hastings	640	AA
Centennial	925	AAA
Marc Garneau	75	A
East Northumberland	991	AAA
Moira	666	AA
North Addington	138	A
Nicholson	543	AA
North Hastings	555	AA
Prince Edward	661	AA
Quinte Christian	152	A
Quinte	610	AA
St. Paul	423	A
St. Theresa	719	AA
Trenton	740	AA
