= Wellington, Ontario =

Wellington
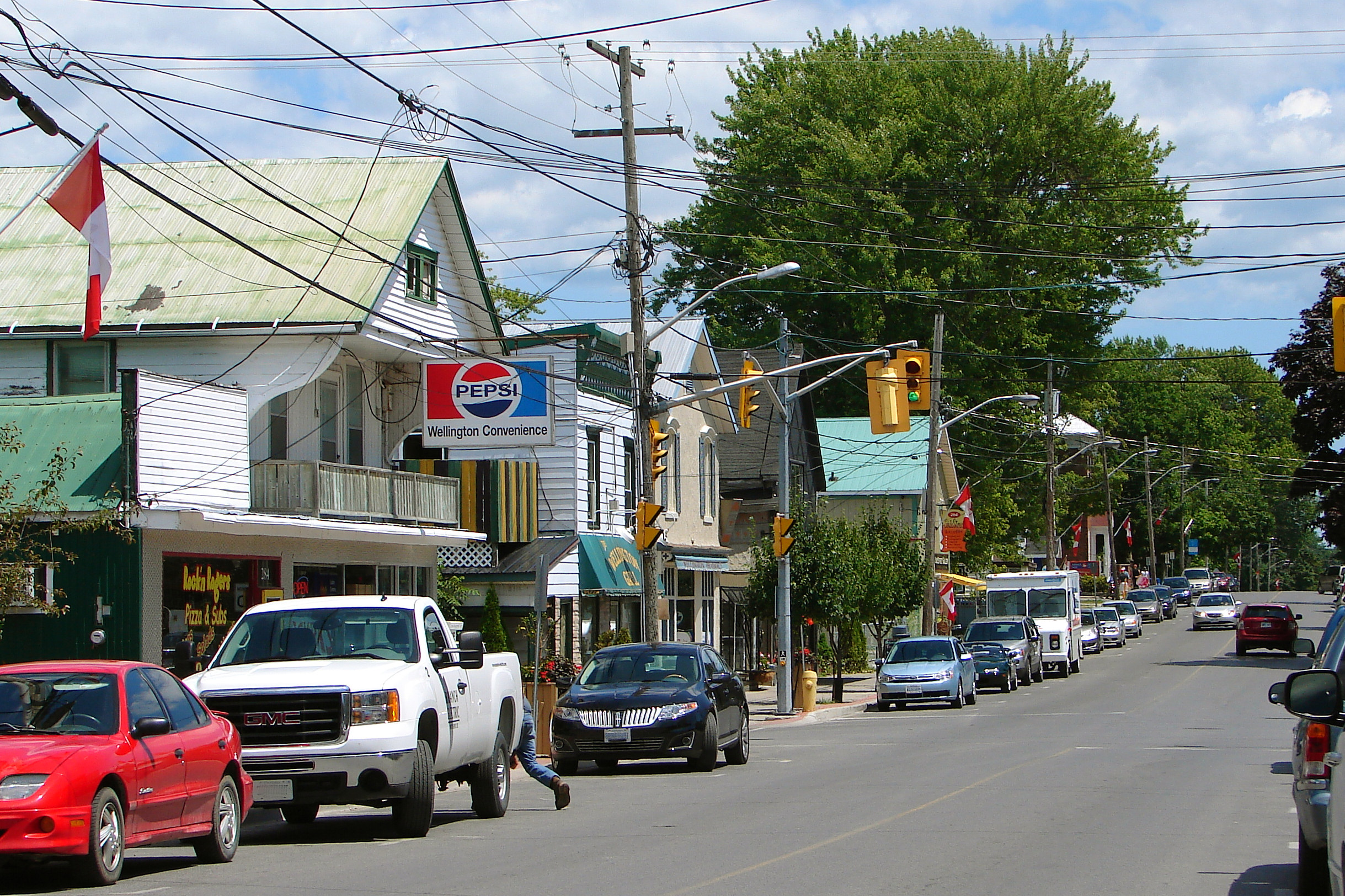
- Main street of Wellington

- Flag

- Location in southern Ontario
- Coordinates: 43°57′08″N 77°21′02″W
- Country: Canada
- Province: Ontario
- County: Prince Edward

Government
  - Mayor (of county): Steve Ferguson
  - MP, Prince Edward—Hastings: Shelby Kramp Neuman
  - MPP, Prince Edward—Hastings: Todd Smith

Area
  - Total: 7.02 km^{2} (2.71 sq mi)
- Elevation: 78 m (256 ft)

Population (2016)
  - Total: 1,932
  - Density: 275/km^{2} (713/sq mi)
- Time zone: UTC-5 (Eastern Time Zone)
  - Summer (DST): UTC-4 (Eastern Time Zone)
- Postal codes in Canada: K0K 3L0
- Area codes: 613, 343
- Website: prince-edward-county.com/wellington/

Wellington is an unincorporated place and community in Prince Edward County in eastern Ontario, Canada. It has a population of 1,932 according to the 2016 Census. The community is located on the shore of both Lake Ontario and West Lake in the southwest of the county. Sandbanks Beach, the northernmost of Sandbanks Provincial Park's beaches, is located in the Village of Wellington, where it is called Wellington Rotary Beach.

It is separated from the Sandbanks Provincial Park by a canal through the beach to Wellington Harbour.

== Demographics ==
Canada census – Wellington, Ontario community profile

	2016	2011
Population	1932 (+3.9% from 2011)	1860 (+2.9% from 2006)
Land area	7.02 km^{2} (2.71 sq mi)	6.99 km^{2} (2.70 sq mi)
Population density	275.4/km^{2} (713/sq mi)	265.9/km^{2} (689/sq mi)
Median age	64.8 (M: 65.4, F: 64.3)	62.2 (M: 62.1, F: 62.3)
Private dwellings	1074 (total)	1008 (total)
Median household income	$61824

References: 2016 2011

== History ==
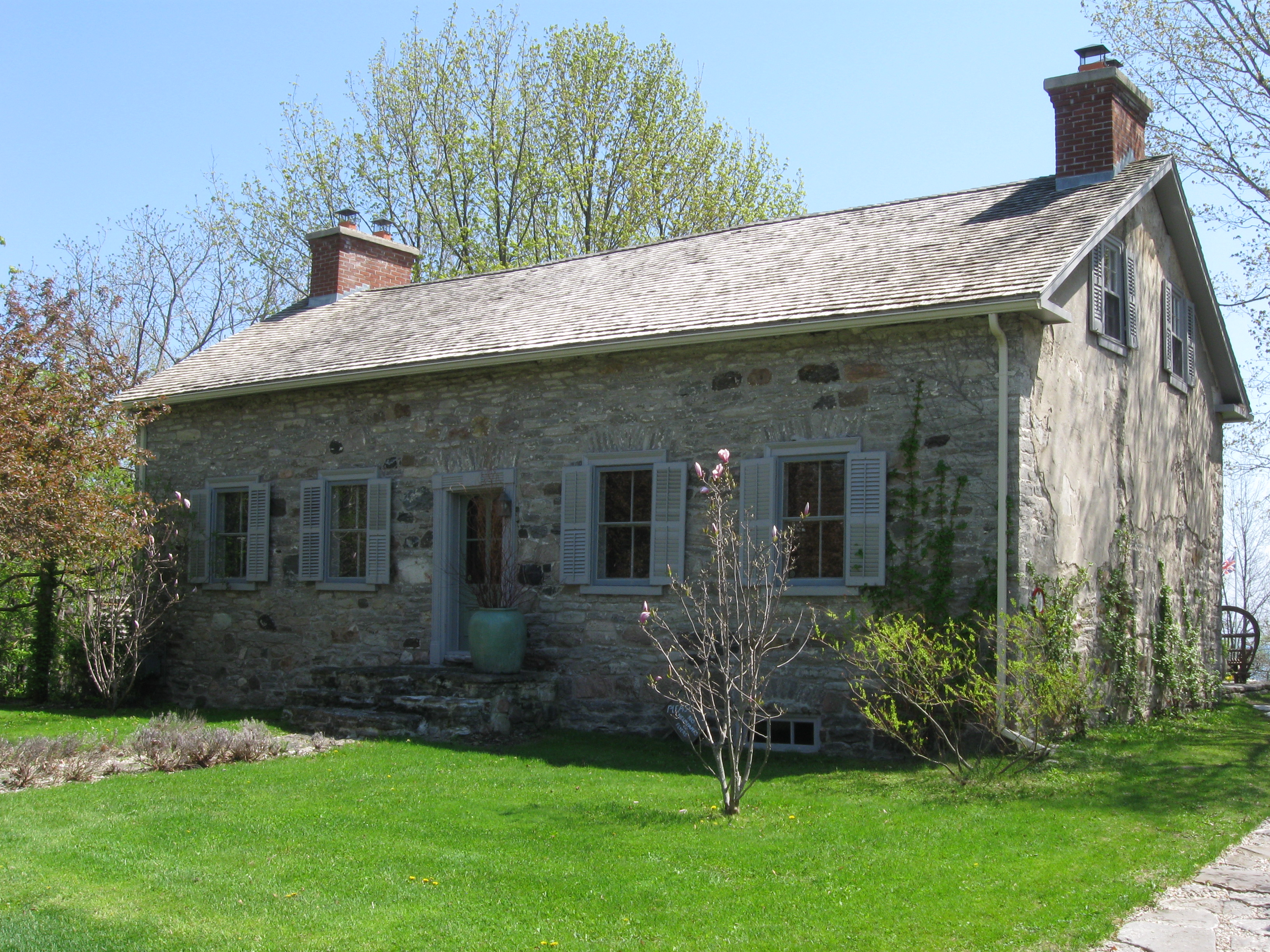
Daniel Reynolds' House, c. 1786 or 1792

Prince Edward County's first non-indigenous resident, Daniel Reynolds, first colonized the area in the 18th century and settled in Wellington, where his house remains today along Main Street. Reynolds was nicknamed "Old Smoke" by local First Nations, hence the community was first known as Smoke Ville. When a post office was established in the 1830s, the village was renamed Wellington after the Duke of Wellington.

== Arts and Culture ==
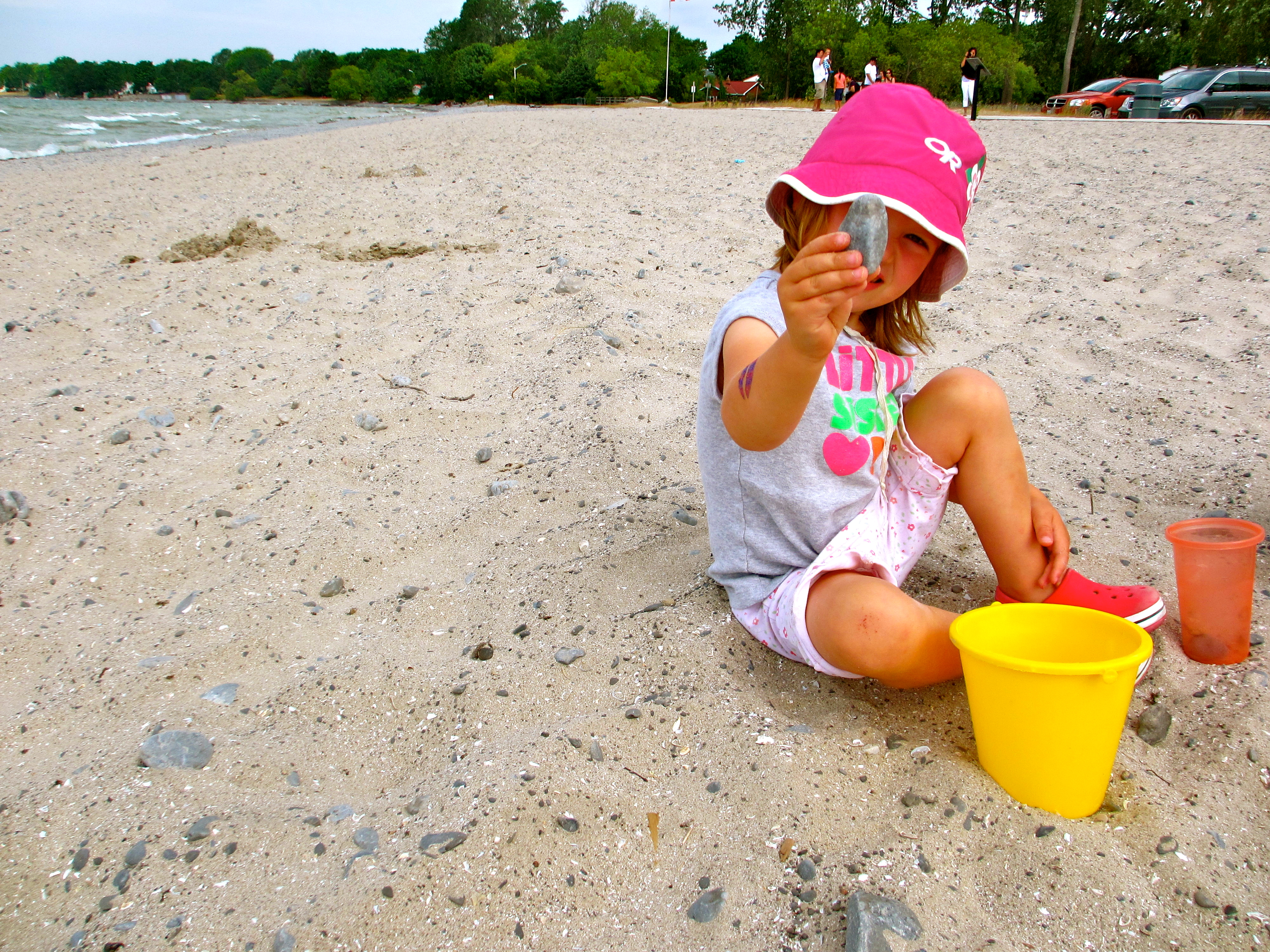
Child at Play on Wellington Beach

The Wellington Heritage Museum is located in the heart of the village, and was built in 1885 as a Quaker Meeting House. A key exhibit is the Douglas A. Crawford Canning Industry Collection, as more than 75 canning factories operated in Prince Edward County from 1882 to 1996.

== Attractions ==
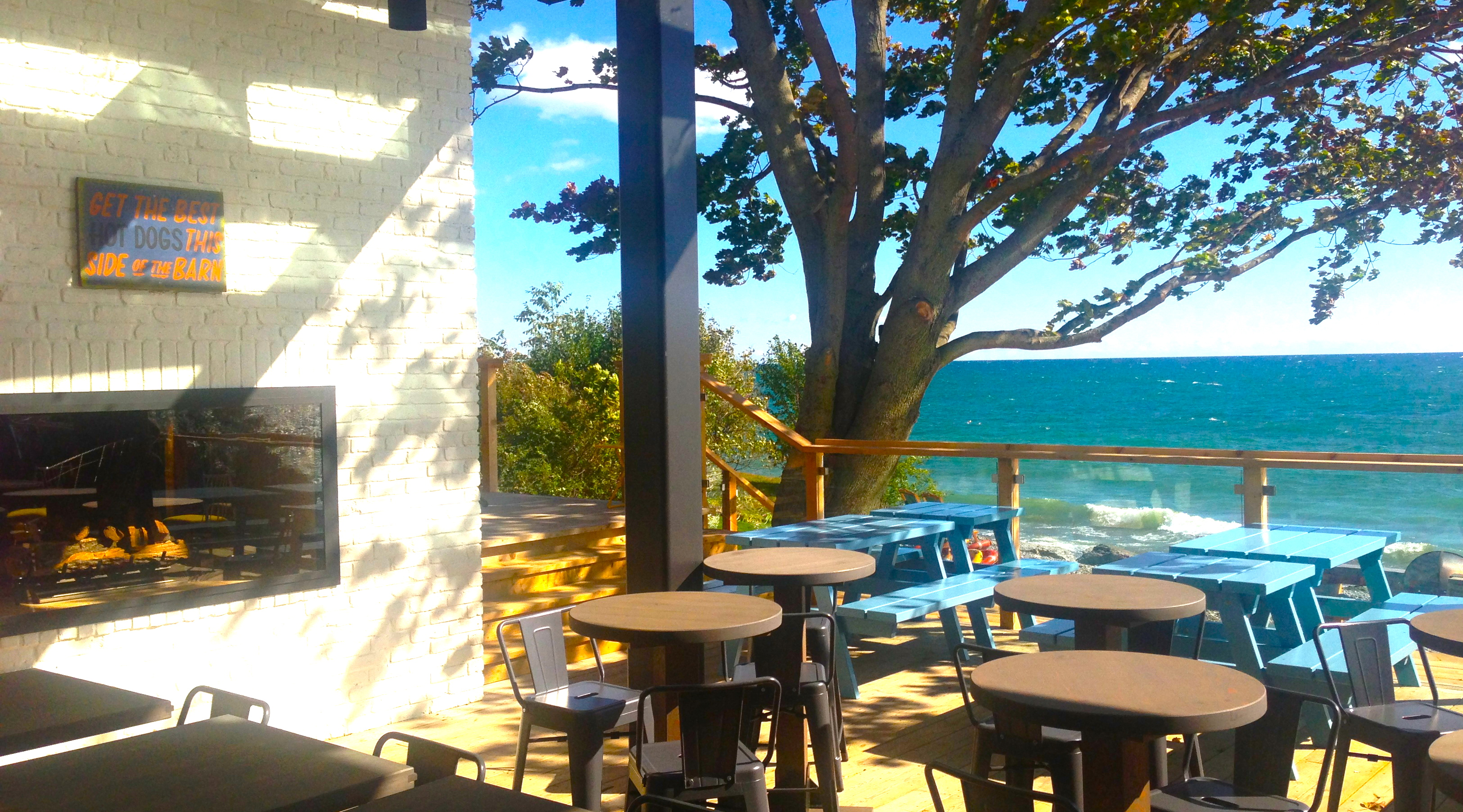
Patio at the Drake Devonshire

The Wellington Farmers' Market is the largest open-air market in the region, and is open from Victoria Day to Labour Day.

The Toronto boutique hotelier The Drake Hotel opened a location in Wellington in the fall of 2014.

== Sports ==
The Wellington Dukes of the Ontario Junior Hockey League (Junior A) play at the Essroc Arena (capacity 1,600), part of the Wellington and District Community Centre. The Prince Edward County Minor Baseball Association plays all its games in Wellington, and the rep teams of the Quinte Royals Baseball Club (Midget and Minor Midget age group teams) play their homes games at the Wellington Field of Dreams. There is also a skating club and an equestrian centre in the community.

== Infrastructure ==
=== Transportation ===
The main road in the community is County Road 33 (formerly Ontario Highway 33), known as the Loyalist Parkway. The road goes northwest to Trenton (part of Quinte West) and east to Picton.

The Prince Edward County Railway from Picton to Trenton ran through the community. It was opened in 1879, was extended to form the Central Ontario Railway in 1882, became part of the Canadian National Railway in 1923, and operated until 1985. The route through the community today forms a rail trail portion of the Millennium Trail.

== Education ==
English language public elementary education from JK to Grade 8 is offered at C.M.L. Snider Public School in the Hastings & Prince Edward District School Board. Students must travel to nearby schools in Belleville for separate school French Immersion education, or to Picton for French-language public elementary education. Both Belleville and Quinte West are about 25 minutes by car north of Wellington. Picton is about 20 minutes east of Wellington.

Secondary students travel to Prince Edward Collegiate in Picton for English language public secondary education, or to Bayside Secondary School in Quinte West for French Immersion public secondary education.

== Media ==
Since 1992, the community has been served by the independent Wellington Times newspaper. The paper is available at over 50 retail locations across the County, and has a circulation of approximately 4,000.

== Notable people ==
- Arthur G. Dorland (1887 – 1979), historian
