= Hastings-Quinte Paramedic Service =

- Motto: Supporting People and our Communities
- Headquarters: Belleville, ON
- Jurisdiction: County
- Employees: 178
- BLS or ALS: Both
- Stations: 8
- Ambulances: 15
- Chief: Carl Bowker
- Responses: 2023: 30,977
- Website: Hastings-Quinte EMS

Hastings-Quinte Paramedic Service is a rural ambulance service for Member Municipalities of Hastings County, including the Cities of Belleville and Quinte West, and also under contract to the Prince Edward County and Mohawks of the Bay of Quinte

== Stations ==
Hastings-Quinte Paramedic Service consists of 8 stations and one post:

=== Hastings County ===
- Millennium Base/ Service HQ - Station 00: 111 Millennium Parkway, Belleville - GPS Coordinates: 44°11′34.1694″N 77°24′21.4338″W
- Farley Base - Station 01: 38 Farley Avenue, Belleville - GPS Coordinates: 44°10′0.1884″N 77°20′55.9674″W
- Quinte West Base - Station 02: 25 Frankford Crescent Unit 4, Bldg 58, Trenton - GPS Coordinates: 44°7′4.8216″N 77°35′36.5388″W
- Madoc Base - Station 03: 244 St. Lawrence Street West: Madoc - GPS Coordinates: 44°30′14.1084″N 77°29′2.097″W
- Bancroft Base - Station 04: 33B Chemaushgon Street, Bancroft, Ontario - GPS Coordinates: 45°3′32.6088″N 77°51′41.0646″W
- Tweed Post - Post 06: 127 G River Street West, Tweed, Ontario - GPS Coordinates: 44°28′22.0584″N 77°18′43.6968″W
- Stirling Base/Service HQ - Station 07: 2547 Stirling-Marmora Road, Stirling, Ontario
- Mohawks Base - Station 08: 39 Meadow Dr, Marysville, Ontario

=== Prince Edward County ===
- Picton Base - Station 01: 12 MacSteven Drive, Picton, Ontario - GPS Coordinates: 44°0′55.6734″N 77°8′36.5208″W

== Ambulance Helipads ==
Air ambulance for the province is provided by Ornge.

- The Madoc base has a helipad to provide air ambulance transfers. 44°30′16.1″N 77°29′1.7″W
- Bancroft has a helipad for emergency transfers located at Bancroft Airport. 45°4′18.789″N 77°52′44.7126″W
- The Belleville helipad is located near the Belleville Hospital. 44°10′1.9626″N 77°21′1.5546″W

== Rank ==
- Director / Chief
- Deputy Chief - Quality and Development
- Deputy Chief - Operations
- Superintendents - Advanced/Primary Care
- Paramedic Team Leaders
- Paramedics - Advanced Care
- Paramedics - Primary Care

== Fleet ==
- Type III ambulances: Crestline FleetMax Bodies, Chevrolet Van Chassis Cabs
- Supervisor Car - Ford Expedition SSV SUV, Ford F-250 Pickups, Ford Escape ERVs

== See also ==
Paramedicine in Canada

- List of EMS Services in Ontario
- Paramedics in Canada
- Emergency Medical Services in Canada

Emergency Services in Hastings & Prince Edward Counties

- Ontario Provincial Police
