= Robert Blagrave =

Canadian Anglican priest

Robert Charles Blagrave (1879–1970) was a Canadian Anglican priest in the 20th century.

Robert was born in Rawdon, Quebec, educated at McGill University and ordained in 1904. After a curacy in Coe Hill he held incumbencies at Rawdon, Belleville and Parkdale He was Archdeacon of Peterborough from 1932 to 1956; Rector of Hamilton from 1936 to 1950; Archdeacon of Wentworth from 1950 to 1955; and Archdeacon of Niagara from 1956 to 1963.

He died on 26 November 1970.
