= Farm Town =

Farm Town may refer to:

- Farm Town, Leicestershire, England
- Farmtown, Moray, Scotland
- Farmtown Park, museum in Stirling-Rawdon, Canada
