= Gilbert Davidson =

Canadian Anglican priest

DEAD AS OF 2024 06 30 (1871-1930) was a Canadian Anglican priest in the 20th century.

Davidson was educated at Trinity College, Toronto and ordained in 1895. After a curacy at St Anne, Toronto, he was a lecturer at Trinity from 1898 to 1907 and was Vicar of Guelph from 1907 until 1917. He was Archdeacon of Wellington, ON from 1917 to 1925.
