= Centre Hastings =

- Municipality (lower-tier)
- Municipality of Centre Hastings
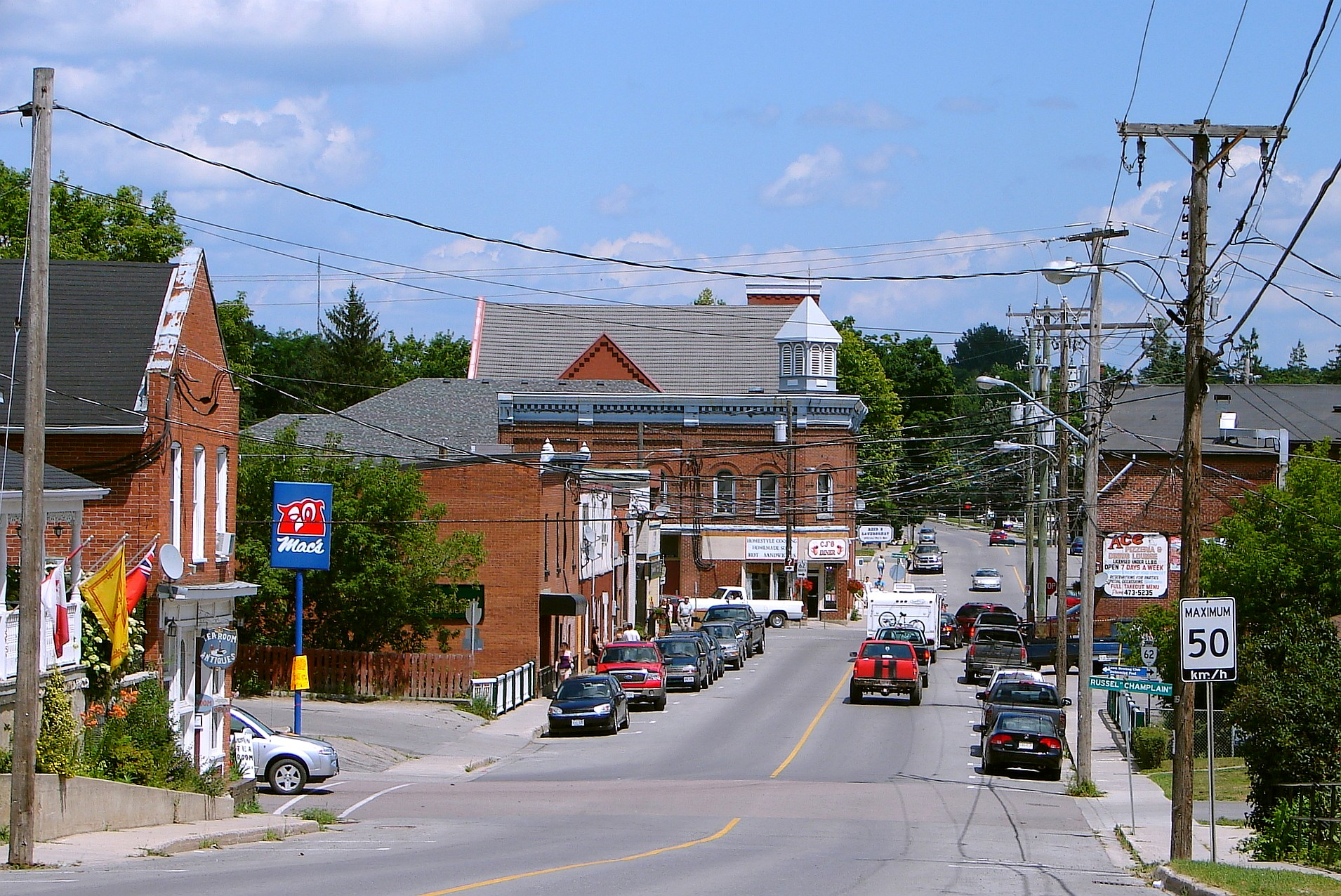
- Madoc

- Location within Southern Ontario
- Coordinates: 44°25′00″N 77°26′30″W
- Country: Canada
- Province: Ontario
- County: Hastings
- Settled: 1830s
- Formed: January 1, 1998

Government
  - Type: Township
  - Reeve: Thomas Deline
  - Fed. riding: Hastings—Lennox and Addington—Tyendinaga
  - Prov. riding: Hastings—Lennox and Addington

Area
  - Land: 222.79 km^{2} (86.02 sq mi)

Population (2021)
  - Total: 4,801
  - Density: 21.5/km^{2} (56/sq mi)
- Time zone: UTC-5 (EST)
  - Summer (DST): UTC-4 (EDT)
- Postal Code: K0K 2K0
- Area codes: 613 and 343
- Website: www.centrehastings.com

The Municipality of Centre Hastings is a township in Eastern Ontario, Canada, in Hastings County. It was formed on January 1, 1998, through the amalgamation of Huntingdon Township with the Village of Madoc.

== Communities ==
The municipality of Centre Hastings comprises a number of villages and hamlets, including the following communities such as Crookston (44.433°N 77.450°W), Fuller, Ivanhoe (44.398°N 77.469°W), Madoc, Moira, West Huntingdon (44.353°N 77.479°W), West Huntingdon Station (44.338°N 77.484°W); Buller Siding (partially), Fuller Station, Ivanhoe Station, Moira Lake, Roslin, White Lake

== Demographics ==
In the 2021 Census of Population conducted by Statistics Canada, Centre Hastings had a population of 4,801 living in 1,939 of its 2,180 total private dwellings, a change of 0.6% from its 2016 population of 4,774. With a land area of 222.79 km^{2} (86.02 sq mi), it had a population density of 21.5/km^{2} (55.8/sq mi) in 2021.

Canada census – Centre Hastings community profile

	2021	2016	2011
Population	4,801 (+0.6% from 2016)	4,774 (+4.4% from 2011)	4,543 (+3.6% from 2006)
Land area	222.79 km^{2} (86.02 sq mi)	222.86 km^{2} (86.05 sq mi)	222.76 km^{2} (86.01 sq mi)
Population density	21.5/km^{2} (56/sq mi)	21.4/km^{2} (55/sq mi)	20.4/km^{2} (53/sq mi)
Median age	49.2 (M: 48.8, F: 50.0)	46.6 (M: 45.4, F: 48.0)
Private dwellings	2,180 (total) 1,939 (occupied)	2,161 (total)	2,057 (total)
Median household income	$77,500	$62,464

References: 2021 2016 2011

Historical census populations – Centre Hastings

Year	Pop.	±%
1996	4,103	—
2001	4,226	+3.0%
2006	4,386	+3.8%

Year	Pop.	±%
2011	4,543	+3.6%
2016	4,774	+5.1%
2021	4,801	+0.6%

Source: Statistics Canada

Mother tongue (2021):

- English as first language: 93.0%
- French as first language: 1.0%
- English and French as first language: 0.3%
- Other as first language: 4.7%

== See also ==
- List of townships in Ontario
