= Centre Hastings Secondary School =

Central Hastings School

Location
- 129 Elgin Street, Box 520; Madoc, Ontario, K0K 2K0; Canada
- 44°30′17″N 77°28′06″W

Information
- Former name: Centre Hastings Secondary School
- School type: Public K-12 school
- School board: Hastings and Prince Edward District School Board
- Area trustee: Chris Brant
- School number: 930
- Principal: Kellen Dostaler
- Principal: Tyler Sawkins
- Grades: K-12
- Language: English
- Campus: Rural
- Colours: black and gold
- Team name: Centurions, Mavericks
- Communities served: Madoc Township, Marmora and Lake, Tweed, Springbrook
- Website: schools.hpedsb.on.ca/chss

Central Hastings School (CHS) is a K-12 school located in Madoc, Ontario in Hastings County serving 800+ students from across Centre Hastings. They offer Specialized High Skills Major which is a specialized high school diploma where students focus their secondary school education around the construction sector.

The school was formerly Centre Hastings Secondary School. An accommodation review of schools in the area during 2016-2017 resulted in a Board decision to close Madoc Public School and consolidate it with Centre Hastings Secondary School as a K-12 school on the Centre Hastings site. The HPEDSB received $5.8 million in Ministry of Education funding in 2018, along with an additional $2.7 million in April 2020, to consolidate Madoc Public School and Centre Hastings Secondary School to create a K-12 school.

CHS has established itself as a community leader hosting dance recitals from the nearby Madoc School of Dance Arts and giving space to the elearnnetwork.ca to set up a centre inside the school.

Some of the features offered at CHS:

- 6 computer labs
- Transportation, construction and manufacturing facilities
- Music rooms
- Drama room
- Fitness facility
- Double gym, single gym and 2 playing fields
- Playground including swing set
- 300 metre running track

== See also ==
- Education in Ontario
- List of high schools in Ontario
