= Hastings County =

County in Ontario, Canada

- County (upper-tier)
- County of Hastings
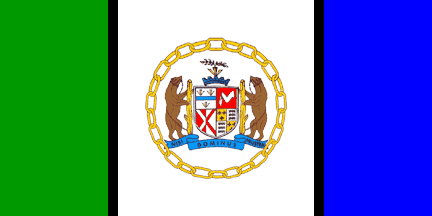
- Flag Seal Coat of arms
- Motto: Communities With Opportunities
- Hastings County
- Coordinates: 44°45′N 77°35′W
- Country: Canada
- Province: Ontario
- County seat: Belleville
- Municipalities: List: Town of Bancroft; Town of Deseronto; Municipality of Centre Hastings; Municipality of Quinte West; Municipality of Hastings Highlands; Township of Carlow/Mayo; Township of Faraday; Township of Limerick; Township of Madoc; Municipality (township) of Marmora and Lake; Township of Stirling-Rawdon; Township of Tudor and Cashel; Municipality of Tweed; Township of Tyendinaga; Township of Wollaston

Area
  - Land: 5,270.75 km^{2} (2,035.05 sq mi)
  - Census division: 6,013.35 km^{2} (2,321.77 sq mi)
- Land area excludes Belleville & Quinte West

Population (2021)
  - Total: 44,115
  - Density: 8.4/km^{2} (22/sq mi)
  - Census division: 145,746
  - Census division density: 24.2/km^{2} (63/sq mi)
- Total excludes Belleville & Quinte West
- Time zone: UTC-5 (EST)
  - Summer (DST): UTC-4 (EDT)
- Website: www.hastingscounty.com

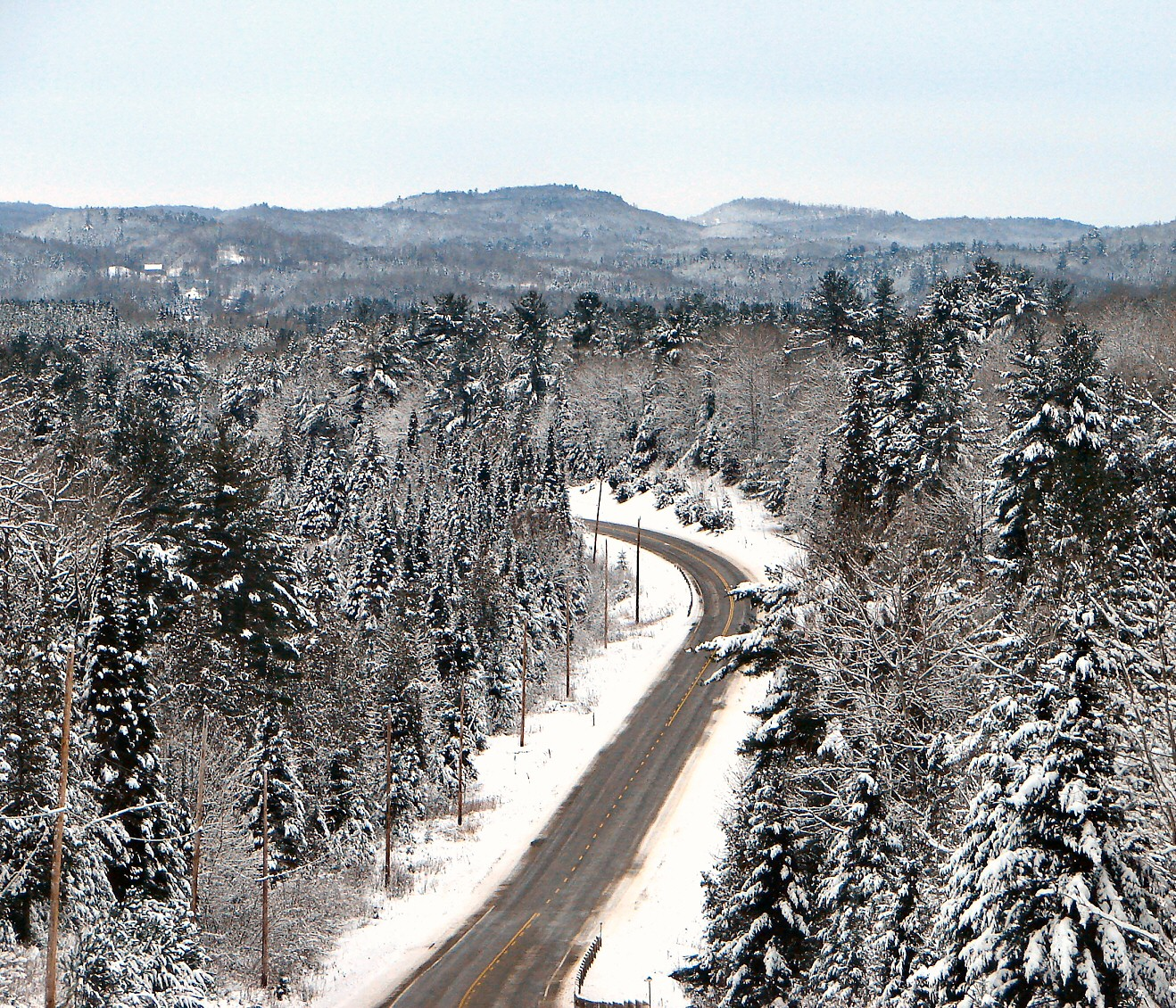
The northern portion of Hastings County is characterized by the rugged landscape of the Madawaska Highlands.

Hastings County is a county and census division of the Canadian province of Ontario. Geographically, it is located on the border of Eastern Ontario and Central Ontario. Hastings County is the second-largest county in Ontario, after Renfrew County. Its county seat is Belleville, which is, along with Quinte West, independent of Hastings County.

Hastings County has trademarked the moniker "Cheese Capital of Canada".

== Administrative divisions ==
The 14 local municipalities within Hastings County are:

- Town of Bancroft
- Town of Deseronto
- Municipality of Centre Hastings
- Municipality of Hastings Highlands
- Municipality of Tweed
- Municipality of Marmora and Lake
- Township of Carlow/Mayo
- Township of Faraday
- Township of Limerick
- Township of Madoc
- Township of Stirling-Rawdon
- Township of Tudor and Cashel
- Township of Tyendinaga
- Township of Wollaston

The Tyendinaga Mohawk Territory is within the Hastings census division but is independent of the county. The cities of Belleville and Quinte West are separated municipalities and so are within the geographical boundaries of the county and included in the Hastings census division, but they not under the administration of the county government.

== History ==
Hastings County (named for Francis Rawdon-Hastings) was first organized for electoral purposes in 1792, with its boundaries described as being:

bounded on the east by the westernmost boundary of the county of Lenox, on the south by the bay of Quinte, until it meets a boundary on the easternmost line of the river Trent, thence along the river until it intersects the rear of the ninth concession, thence by a line running north sixteen degrees west until it intersects the river Ottawa or Grand river, thence descending the said river until it meets the northwesternmost boundary of the county of Addington; and the said county of Hastings to comprehend all the islands of the bay of Quinte and the river Trent nearest to the said county, in the whole or in greater part fronting the same.

For the initial elections to the Legislative Assembly of Upper Canada, it was united with Northumberland County and most of Lennox County for purposes of returning one member.

It was situated within the Mecklenburg District, which was later renamed the "Midland District" in 1792.

In 1798, the Parliament of Upper Canada passed legislation to provide, that, at the beginning of 1800:

... the townships of Sidney, Thurlow, the tract of land occupied by the Mohawks, Huntingdon, Hungerford, and Rawdon, do constitute and form the county of Hastings.

The territory withdrawn from the County continued to form part of the Midland District.

=== 19th century ===
In 1821, the newly surveyed townships of Elzevir, Madoc and Marmora were added to the county. While in this time agriculture was the most important industry in Hastings County, by 1822 (when the Marmora Iron Works was approaching its peak production) mining was playing an increasingly more important role in the area's economy.

Prominent citizens of Hastings County and Ameliasburgh Township unsuccessfully petitioned the provincial government for district status during 1817, 1818, 1823 and 1825. After Prince Edward County successfully achieved its own government in 1831, Hastings County continued to send petitions throughout the 30s before finally achieving the status of a separate district in March 1837.

It was constituted as the District of Victoria in 1839 (which continued until its dissolution in 1850). By 1845, the county was declared to consist of the following geographic townships:

- Elzevir
- Grimsthorpe
- Hungerford
- Huntingdon
- Lake
- Marmora
- Madoc
- Rawdon
- Sydney
- Tudor
- Thurlow
- Tyendinaga

Belleville, after an abortive attempt two years previously, was organized as a municipality with its own Board of Police in 1836, and was designated as the district seat in 1837. It was constituted as a town under the Baldwin Act in 1850, and later became a city in 1877.

Edward Fidlar became the first warden of Hastings County with their first meeting on January 28, 1850. By this time the Hastings County Council was also interested in education and the building of the railroad.

On October 27, 1856, the first railroad train arrived in Belleville and by 1864 around 100 people were employed by the railroad.

In August 1866, discovery of gold at Eldorado, near Madoc, caused great excitement throughout Hastings County as people flooded to the area from all over North America. According to Barnes, "gold has been found in twenty-seven locations spread over nine townships." The railroads and 170 miles (270 km) of good gravel roads opened these areas to settlement by 1880.

In 1889 the Belleville Waterworks was created as a private company, which was then bought by the city of Belleville in 1889.

=== 20th century ===
In 1911, Hastings County was the first in the province to appoint a reforestation committee, which was instrumental in passing laws around county forests. Postal service began in the area in 1913.

By 1927 the original townships had each formed separate governance and many of them had been partitioned due to increase in population and development. The 1927 townships were:

- Bangor
- Carlow
- Cashel
- Dungannon
- Elzevir
- Faraday
- Grimsthorpe
- Herschel
- Hungerford
- Huntingdon
- Lake
- Limerick
- Madoc
- Marmora
- Mayo
- McClure
- Monteagle
- Rawdon
- Sidney
- Thurlow
- Tudor
- Tyendinaga
- Wicklow
- Wollaston

Following World War II, more efficient communication and transportation led a trend toward consolidation of township administrations:

- The Township of Carlow/Mayo was formed by amalgamation of the contiguous townships of Carlow and Mayo.
- The Township of Wicklow and McClure was formed by amalgamation of the contiguous townships of McClure and Wicklow.
- Lake Township and Marmora Township were administered as the Township of Marmora & Lake.
- Elzevir Township and Grimsthorpe Township were administered as the Township of Elzevir & Grimsthorpe since before 1968.
- The Township of Tudor and Cashel was formed by amalgamation of the geographically non-contiguous townships of Cashel and Tudor.

=== 21st century ===
Jack Hattin, the former Reeve of Bancroft and Warden of Hastings County in 1987.

At the dawn of the 21st century, there has been a trend toward amalgamating rural and urban administrations. On 1 January 1998:

- The City of Quinte West was formed through amalgamation of the City of Trenton and the Township of Sidney from Hastings County, with the Village of Frankford and the Township of Murray from Northumberland County.
- The Municipality of Centre Hastings was incorporated by amalgamating Huntingdon Township with the Village of Madoc.
- The Township of Stirling-Rawdon was formed through the amalgamation of Rawdon Township with the Village of Stirling.

In 1998, the Village of Tweed was amalgamated with its Township of Hungerford and the contiguous Township of Elzevir & Grimsthorpe to form the Municipality of Tweed. In 1999, the Village of Bancroft merged with Dungannon Township to form the Town of Bancroft.

On 1 January 2001, the Municipality of Hastings Highlands was incorporated by amalgamating the contiguous townships of Bangor, Wicklow & McClure, Herschel and Monteagle. Also in 2001, the Village of Marmora amalgamated with the surrounding townships of Marmora and Lake to form the Municipality of Marmora and Lake.

== Demographics ==
As a census division in the 2021 Census of Population conducted by Statistics Canada, Hastings County had a population of 145,746 living in 61,141 of its 68,518 total private dwellings, a change of 6.8% from its 2016 population of 136,445. With a land area of 6,013.35 km^{2} (2,321.77 sq mi), it had a population density of 24.2/km^{2} (62.8/sq mi) in 2021.

Canada census – Hastings census division community profile

	2021	2016	2011
Population	145,746 (+6.8% from 2016)	136,445 (+1.1% from 2011)	134,934 (3.4% from 2006)
Land area	6,013.35 km^{2} (2,321.77 sq mi)	6,103.92 km^{2} (2,356.74 sq mi)	6,103.48 km^{2} (2,356.57 sq mi)
Population density	24.2/km^{2} (63/sq mi)	22.4/km^{2} (58/sq mi)	22.1/km^{2} (57/sq mi)
Median age	47.6 (M: 46.0, F: 49.2)	46.3 (M: 45.1, F: 47.4)
Private dwellings	68,518 (total) 61,141 (occupied)	65,136 (total) 57,017 (occupied)	63,014 (total)
Median household income	$75,000	$61,109

Notes: Includes Belleville and Quinte West.
References: 2021 2016 2011

Historical census populations – Hastings County

Year	Pop.	±%
1921	57,523	—
1931	58,846	+2.3%
1941	63,322	+7.6%
1951	74,298	+17.3%
1956	83,745	+12.7%
1961	93,377	+11.5%

Year	Pop.	±%
1966	94,127	+0.8%
1971	99,393	+5.6%
1976	105,837	+6.5%
1981	106,883	+1.0%
1986	109,352	+2.3%
1991	116,434	+6.5%

Year	Pop.	±%
1996	118,744	+2.0%
2001	125,915	+6.0%
2006	130,474	+3.6%
2011	134,934	+3.4%
2016	136,445	+1.1%
2021	145,746	+6.8%

2001 and 2006 population figures exclude incompletely enumerated Indian reserve. Population counts are not adjusted for boundary changes.
Source: Statistics Canada

=== North Hastings ===
The northern half of Hastings County is known as North Hastings.

North Hastings includes 2,683 square kilometres and seven municipalities: Carlow/Mayo, Faraday Township, Hastings Highlands, Limerick, Tudor and Cashel, Wollaston and Bancroft.

== County council ==
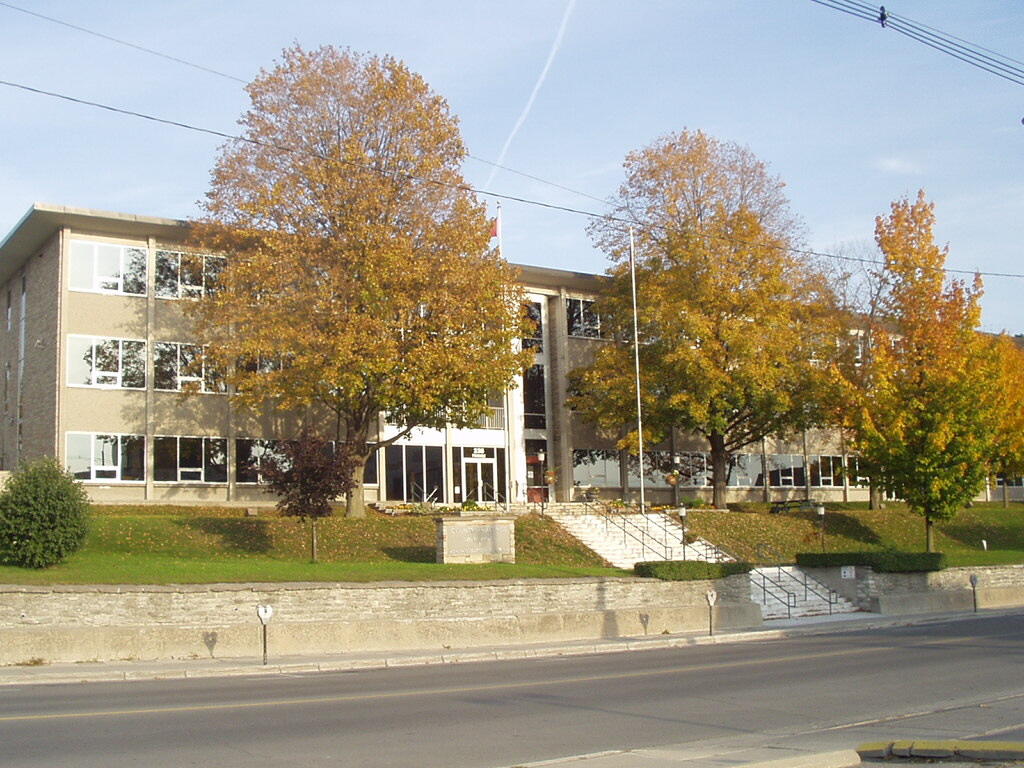
Hastings County offices in downtown Belleville.

Following are members of Hastings County Council as of August, 2019:

- Warden: Rick Phillips
- Town of Bancroft: Paul Jenkins
- Township of Carlow/Mayo: Bonnie Adams
- Municipality of Centre Hastings: Tom Deline
- Town of Deseronto: Dan Johnston
- Township of Faraday: Dennis Purcell
- Hastings Highlands: Tracy Hagar
- Township of Limerick: Carl Stefanski
- Township of Madoc: Loyde Blackburn
- Municipality of Marmora & Lake: Jan O'Neill
- Township of Stirling/Rawdon: Bob Mullin
- Township of Tudor & Cashel: Libby Clarke
- Municipality of Tweed: Jo-Anne Albert
- Township of Tyendinaga: Rick Phillips
- Township of Wollaston: Lynn Kruger

== Transportation ==
The county is served by Highway 401 in the south, Highway 7, a leg of the Trans-Canada Highway, in the central region, Highways 62 and 37 travelling north to south, Highway 28 travelling east to west in the northern region, and Highway 127 travelling north from Maynooth, also in the northern region.

== Emergency services ==
There are 5 EMS stations in Hastings County with Hastings-Quinte EMS HQ located in Belleville, Ontario.

== Education ==
Currently, Hastings & Prince Edward District School Board operates public schools. Previously, Hastings County Board of Education operated public schools.

== See also ==
- List of municipalities in Ontario
- Southern Ontario
- Eastern Ontario
- Central Ontario
- List of townships in Ontario
