= Wollaston, Ontario =

Wollaston
- Township (lower-tier)
- Township of Wollaston
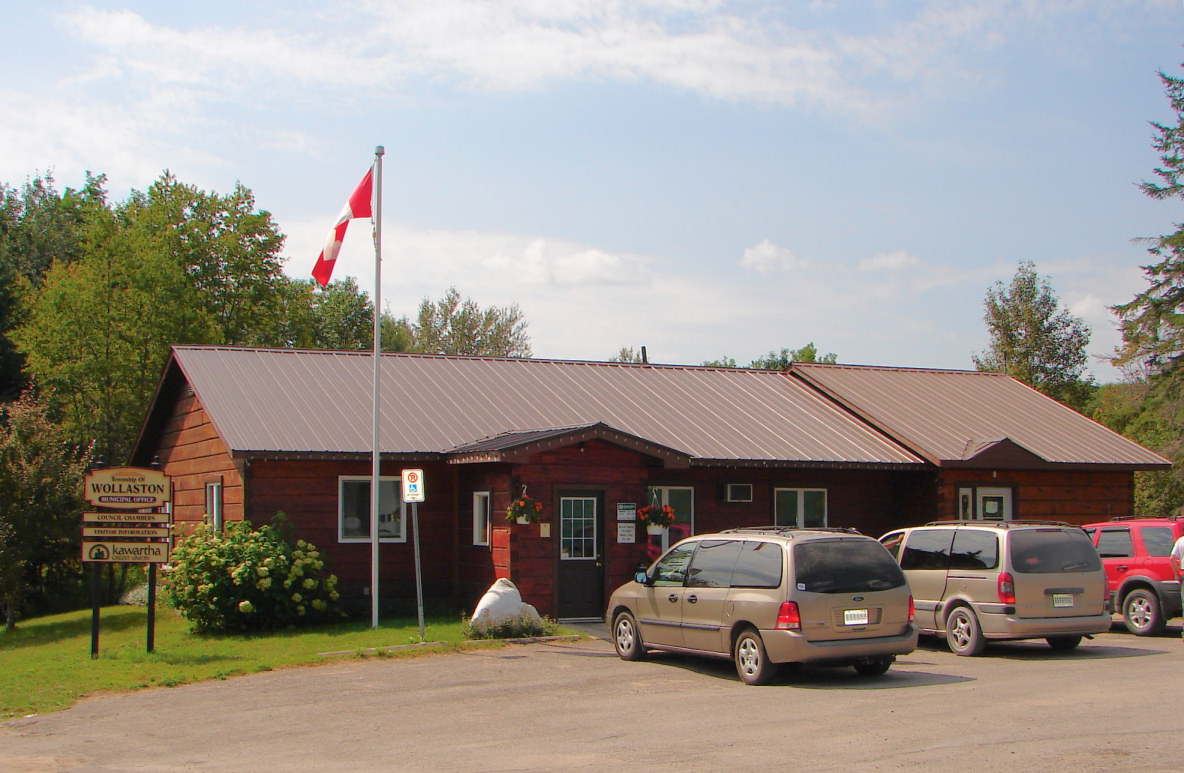
- Municipal office in Coe Hill

- Location within Southern Ontario
- Coordinates: 44°57′22″N 77°50′01″W
- Country: Canada
- Province: Ontario
- County: Hastings
- Settled: 1860s
- Incorporated: 1880

Government
  - Type: Township
  - Mayor: Michael Fuerth
  - MP: Shelby Kramp-Neuman
  - MPP: Ric Bresee

Area
  - Land: 215.87 km^{2} (83.35 sq mi)

Population (2021)
  - Total: 721
  - Density: 3.3/km^{2} (8.5/sq mi)
- Time zone: UTC-5 (EST)
  - Summer (DST): UTC-4 (EDT)
- Postal Code: K0L 1P0
- Area codes: 613 and 343
- Website: wollaston.ca

Wollaston is an incorporated township in Hastings County, Ontario, Canada. The township had a population of 721 in the 2021 Canadian census.

== Geography ==
=== Communities ===
The township of Wollaston only includes the communities of Coe Hill and The Ridge (44°47′54″N 77°49′26″W). The small community of Ormsby, with a population of 20, is right on the eastern municipal boundary of Wollaston with Limerick.

==== Coe Hill ====
Coe Hill (44°51′43″N 77°50′11″W) is the main community in Wollaston Township and is approximately 230 kilometres (140 mi) north-east of Toronto. While referred to as the Hamlet of Coe Hill, it is not truly a hamlet in the strictest British meaning of the word as there are two churches within the village: the Coe Hill Gospel Church and the Coe Hill United Church.

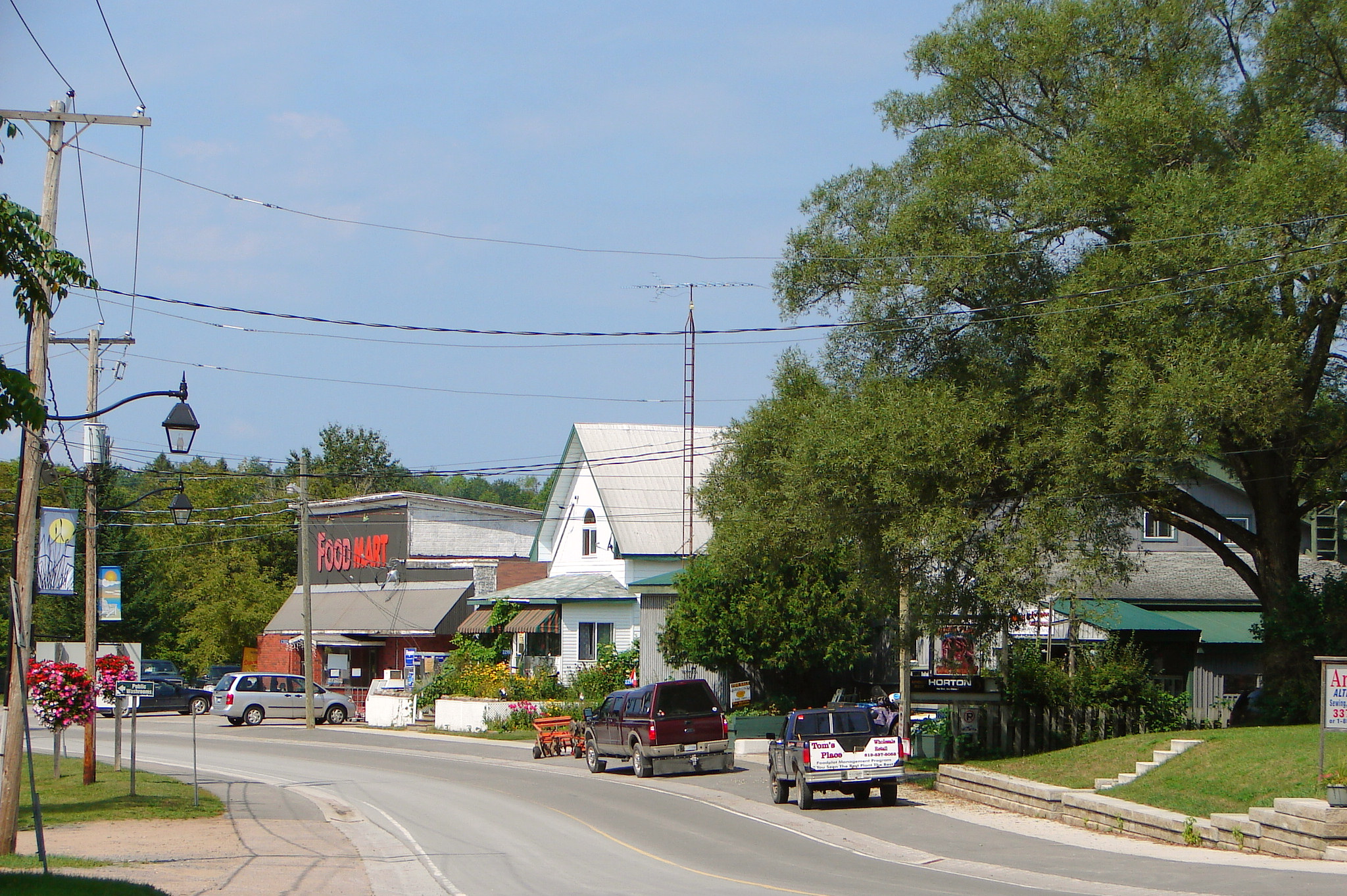
Coe Hill

The local post office serves residents with lock boxes and four rural routes, two of which are for a neighbouring village, Gilmour in Tudor and Cashel Township. Wollaston Township Road 620 is the main road that runs through the community, connecting it to Highways 28 to the west and 62 to the east.

Coe Hill is named after William Pardee Coe, originally from Norfolk, England, and was incorporated in 1880. Original names for this community were Salem, Welch Corners and Coe Hill Mines.

In 1882, iron-ore deposits were discovered in the area. Coe, who was living in Madoc, Ontario, at the time, formed the Coe Hill Mines company to commercialize these newly discovered deposits. Coe was also instrumental in getting the Central Ontario Railway (COR) to build a line that reached Coe Hill in 1884. Shipments began that same year. However, once the shipments were analyzed, it was discovered that the ore was too low-grade to be mined viably leading to the near bankruptcy of the Coe Hill Mines company. William Coe died in 1891 and is interred at the Lakeview Cemetery in Madoc.

With the failure of mining in the area, the main economic focus turned to lumber. Coe Hill remained the primary shipping point for the Rathburn Lumber company. Up to 100 loads of lumber a day were shipped south on the COR. The rail lines have now been abandoned, but have been repurposed as hiking, biking, and snowmobile trails that are used throughout the year. The old Coe Hill railway station still exists and is currently located on the grounds of the annual Coe Hill Fair.

There are several restaurants and shops along the main street offering arts and crafts, a range of services including a garage and a fully licensed bar complete with summertime patio. There is also a well-stocked grocery store and a Liquor Control Board of Ontario (LCBO) outlet often referred to as the "liquor trailer".

== Lakes and Parks ==
=== Wollaston Lake ===
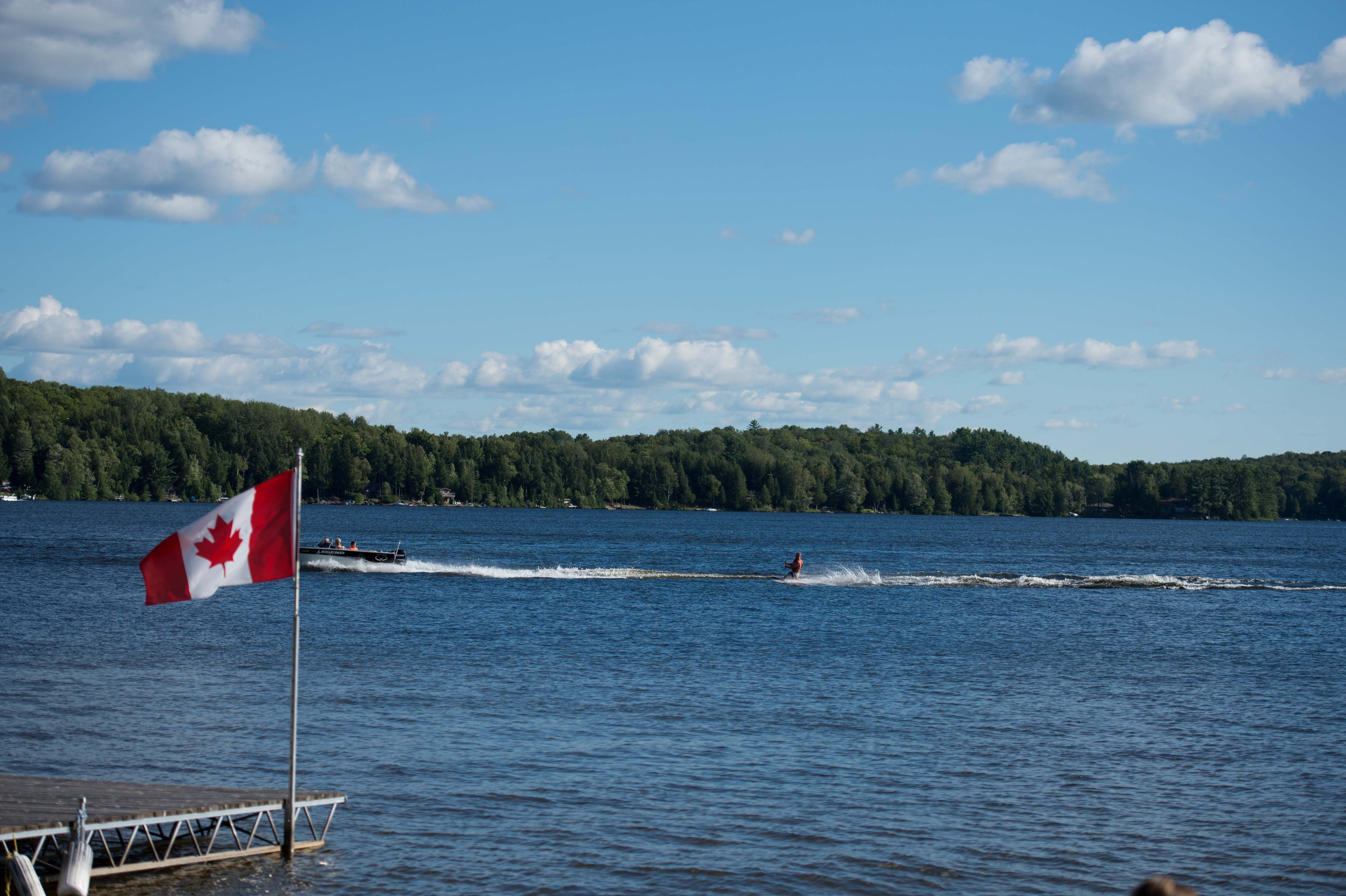
Wollaston Lake - Summer

There are many lakes within Wollaston township including: King Lake, Bear Lake, and Snow Lake. However, the largest lake in the township lies just adjacent to Coe Hill: Wollaston Lake Although Wollaston Lake is the largest lake in the township, it is still relatively small, approximately 6.5 kilometres (4.0 mi) long and covering just 360 hectares (890 acres). It is a deep coldwater lake deemed "at capacity" with a maximum depth of 31.1 metres (102 ft) and a mean depth of 9.4 metres (31 ft). The five principal fish species in the lake are lake trout, largemouth and smallmouth bass, northern pike, and walleye.

Seasonal cottages provide the largest part of the population on the lake, although some cottage owners have winterized cottages that they utilize year-round. The lake is serviced by two camp grounds, a public boat launch, and a public beach that is maintained by the township.

=== Nellie Lunn Park ===
Nellie Lunn Park is a public park near Coe Hill, Ontario, Canada. The 100 acre park includes part of the shore of Urbach Lake. The park was bequeathed to the Township of Wollaston in 1981 by World War II veteran Boleslaw Klincewicz. The park is named after Nellie Lunn, who Klincewicz described as the "love of his life". One of the conditions of Klincewicz's donation was that the land be maintained as a public park. The park was closed to the public in 2020, and in 2022, the Township of Wollaston voted to sell the land to fund a fire hall. The Friends of Nellie Lunn Park organization objected to the planned sale of the park. Other objectors to the sale included two grandsons of Nellie Lunn. On August 9, 2021, the Township of Wollaston voted to delay any decision on the sale of the park to give objectors to the sale three months to present an alternative plan.

Litigation by the Friends of Nellie Lunn Park organization against the Township of Wollaston paused the sale in 2022. In February 2023, the Ontario Superior Court of Justice case concluded, finding that the Klincewicz bequeath did not create a charitable trust, but that the proposed sale was "void because the sale was not properly authorized by by-law of the Township".

The park reopened to the public in 2025. A Township of Wollaston closed meeting about "ongoing litigation" related to the park was inadvertently publicly broadcast in 2026.

== Demographics ==
In the 2021 Census of Population conducted by Statistics Canada, Wollaston had a population of 721 living in 352 of its 757 total private dwellings, a change of 7.6% from its 2016 population of 670. With a land area of 215.87 km^{2} (83.35 sq mi), it had a population density of 3.3/km^{2} (8.7/sq mi) in 2021.

Canada census – Wollaston, Ontario community profile

	2021	2016	2011
Population	721 (+7.6% from 2016)	670 (-5.4% from 2011)	708 (-3.0% from 2006)
Land area	215.87 km^{2} (83.35 sq mi)	219.14 km^{2} (84.61 sq mi)	220.19 km^{2} (85.02 sq mi)
Population density	3.3/km^{2} (8.5/sq mi)	3.1/km^{2} (8.0/sq mi)	3.2/km^{2} (8.3/sq mi)
Median age	58.0 (M: 59.6, F: 56.8)	56.2 (M: 55.8, F: 56.8)
Private dwellings	757 (total) 352 (occupied)	791 (total)	624 (total)
Median household income	$56,400	$48,640

References: 2021 2016 2011

Historical census populations – Wollaston, Ontario

Year	Pop.	±%
1881	423	—
1891	771	+82.3%
1901	834	+8.2%
1911	911	+9.2%
1921	816	−10.4%
1931	949	+16.3%
1941	879	−7.4%
1951	702	−20.1%

Year	Pop.	±%
1956	705	+0.4%
1961	731	+3.7%
1966	582	−20.4%
1971	552	−5.2%
1976	567	+2.7%
1981	639	+12.7%
1986	612	−4.2%
1991	659	+7.7%

Year	Pop.	±%
1996	719	+9.1%
2001	679	−5.6%
2006	730	+7.5%
2011	708	−3.0%
2016	670	−5.4%
2021	721	+7.6%

Source: Statistics Canada

Mother tongue (per 2021 census):

- English as first language: 94.5%
- French as first language: 0.7%
- English and French as first language: 0%
- Other as first language: 4.1%

== Economy ==
Property taxes provide the primary source of income for the township accounting for 61% of the revenue required to balance the 2017 budget. Another major source of revenue for the township was provincial funding via the Ontario Municipality Partnership Fund (OMPF) which provided approximately 80% of non-tax revenue. The Township's mayor Brandon Carter has stood behind the fund since it was first introduced, and has gone on record stating " This fund keeps the town alive".

This revenue provides the income to fund municipal programs. Among these programs is the Community Improvement Plan, the goal of which is to "promote the co-ordinated [sic] implementation of community planning and land use planning programs comprised of maintenance, rehabilitation and redevelopment of the physical, social, and economic environments."

== Activities ==
Coe Hill Agricultural Fair

The Coe Hill Agriculture Fair was founded in 1882 and is held every year on the last weekend of August The first year, the fair was held in Salem, but moved to Coe Hill the following year where there were exhibits in the town hall. It was not until the early 1900s that the fair was moved to its current location at the Coe Hill Agricultural Fair grounds on Township Road 620 on the east side of town. In 1920, the grandstand was built, and in 1969, the Canadian National Railway (formerly the COR) station was moved to the grounds.

Some of the activities at the fair include: a midway (carnival rides), agricultural and horticultural competitions, rodeo events, a demolition derby, live music, and of course food.

Canada Day

Every July 1, Coe Hill celebrates Canada Day with a parade through community’s the main street and a fireworks display on nearby Wollaston Lake.

Royal Canadian Legion

On the main street, almost in the very middle of town, lies the Royal Canadian Legion - Branch 581 building. The Legion hosts a community supper at the end of each month as well as a range of weekly activities, such as: cribbage, darts, euchre, chair volleyball, fitness classes, yoga, and BINGO. There are also bi-weekly breakfasts and music jam sessions on the 1st and 3rd Sunday of the month. There is also a fitness facility located on site, though unfortunately it is now closed.

== See also ==
- List of townships in Ontario
