= North Hastings High School =

Location
- 16 Monck Street; Bancroft, Ontario, K0L 1C0; Canada; 45°03′27″N 77°51′43″W

Information
- School type: Public high school
- School board: Hastings and Prince Edward District School Board
- Superintendent: Tina Jones
- Area trustee: Ron Speck
- School number: 929980
- Principal: Angela Harvey
- Grades: 8-12
- Enrollment: 450 (2024/25)
- Language: English
- Campus: Rural
- Colours: maroon and gold
- Mascot: Husky
- Team name: Huskies
- Communities served: Bancroft, Hastings Highlands
- Website: www.hpedsb.on.ca/nhhs/

North Hastings High School (NHHS) is a high school located in Bancroft, Ontario, Canada serving students in the northern portion of Hastings County and part of the Hastings and Prince Edward District School Board. NHHS offers specialized 4-credit courses which allow students to learn principles of resource management and environmental studies, which help them to gain employment in resource-based careers.

The school had 450 students enrolled during the 2024-25 school year.

== See also ==
- Education in Ontario
- List of secondary schools in Ontario
