= Hastings & Prince Edward District School Board =

School board in Ontario, Canada

Location
- 156 Ann St; Belleville, Ontario; K8N 1N9 Belleville, Quinte West, and surrounding areas Canada
- Coordinates: 44°09′47″N 77°22′31″W

District information
- Chair of the board: Shannon Binder
- Director of education: Katherine McIver
- Schools: 39 elementary schools 8 secondary schools
- District ID: B66222

Other information
- Elected trustees: Amanda Robertson, Belleville/Thurlow; Ernie Parsons, Sidney & Frankford; Rachael Prinzen, North Prince Edward County; Shannon Binder; Southeast Hastings (Chair of the Board); Sandra Maracle, Tyendinaga Mohawk Terr; Kandis Hambley, Trenton & CFB Trenton; Erica Charleton, Belleville/Thurlow; Keri Kramp, Centre Hastings; Stacey Lewis, South Prince Edward County; Ron Speck, North Hastings
- Website: www.hpedsb.on.ca

The Hastings and Prince Edward District School Board (known as English-language Public District School Board No. 29 prior to 1999) has 39 elementary and eight secondary schools, serving over 18,400 students, and employing more than 1,070 teachers and 705 support staff. The school board covers a wide geographical area of 7,221 square kilometres bordered by Maynooth to the north, Deseronto to the east, Prince Edward County to the south and Quinte West to the west.

The eight secondary schools managed by the Board are:

- Bayside Secondary School in Bayside
- Centennial Secondary School in Belleville
- Centre Hastings Secondary School in Madoc
- Eastside Secondary School in Belleville
- North Hastings High School in Bancroft
- Prince Edward Collegiate Institute in Picton
- Quinte Secondary School- Closed in Belleville
- Trenton High School in Trenton

Previously the Hastings County Board of Education and the Prince Edward County Board of Education served their respective areas.

== See also ==
- List of school districts in Ontario
- List of high schools in Ontario
