= Farmtown Park =

Museum in Stirling, Ontario, Canada

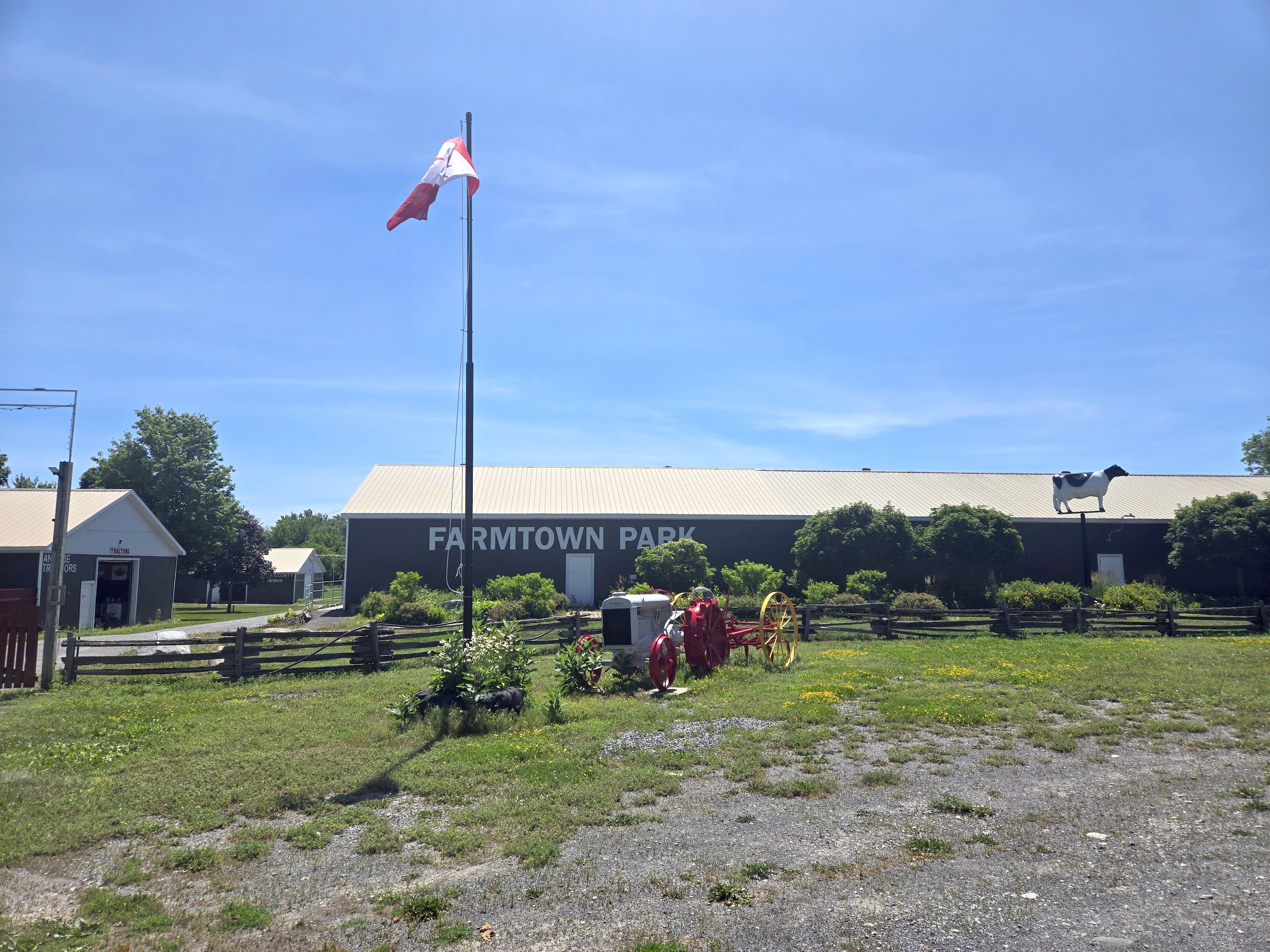
- Former name: Hastings County Museum of Agricultural Heritage
- Established: 1997
- Location: Stirling Fairgrounds, 437 Front Street West, Stirling, Ontario, Canada
- Coordinates: 44°17′17.58″N 77°33′52.28″W
- Website: www.farmtownpark.ca

Farmtown Park is a museum in Stirling, Ontario, Canada. Exhibits focus on rural Ontario culture, farming, and the food industry.

== History ==
Located at the Stirling Fairgrounds, the museum was founded as the Hastings County Museum of Agricultural Heritage in 1997. The first exhibits featured the history of dairy and cheese production.

The museum was renamed "Farmtown Park" in 2015, and was expanded in 2020 to include nine themed buildings on 45,000 square feet (4,200 m^{2}) of land.

== Exhibits ==
Exhibits at Farmtown Park focus on the apple and dairy industries, antique tractors, steam power, and the culture of rural life in Ontario. Many artifacts on display were donated to the museum.

Displays include a blacksmith shop, pioneer farmstead, and a collection of 60 antique tractors.

A 1930s-era heritage village replicates a typical small town in Ontario, with a chapel, fire hall, one-room schoolhouse, and 18 themed storefronts.

The Discovery Centre contains a collection of toy cars, trucks, and tractors; the Quinte Agricultural Wall of Fame recognizes individuals from nearby communities who have contributed to the agriculture and food industry.

Special events at Farmtown Park include a Strawberry Festival, Fibre Fest, 4-H Day, Grandparents Day, Art in the Park, and Overalls and Whitewalls—a classic car and antique tractor event.
