= Quinte West =

- City (single-tier)
- City of Quinte West
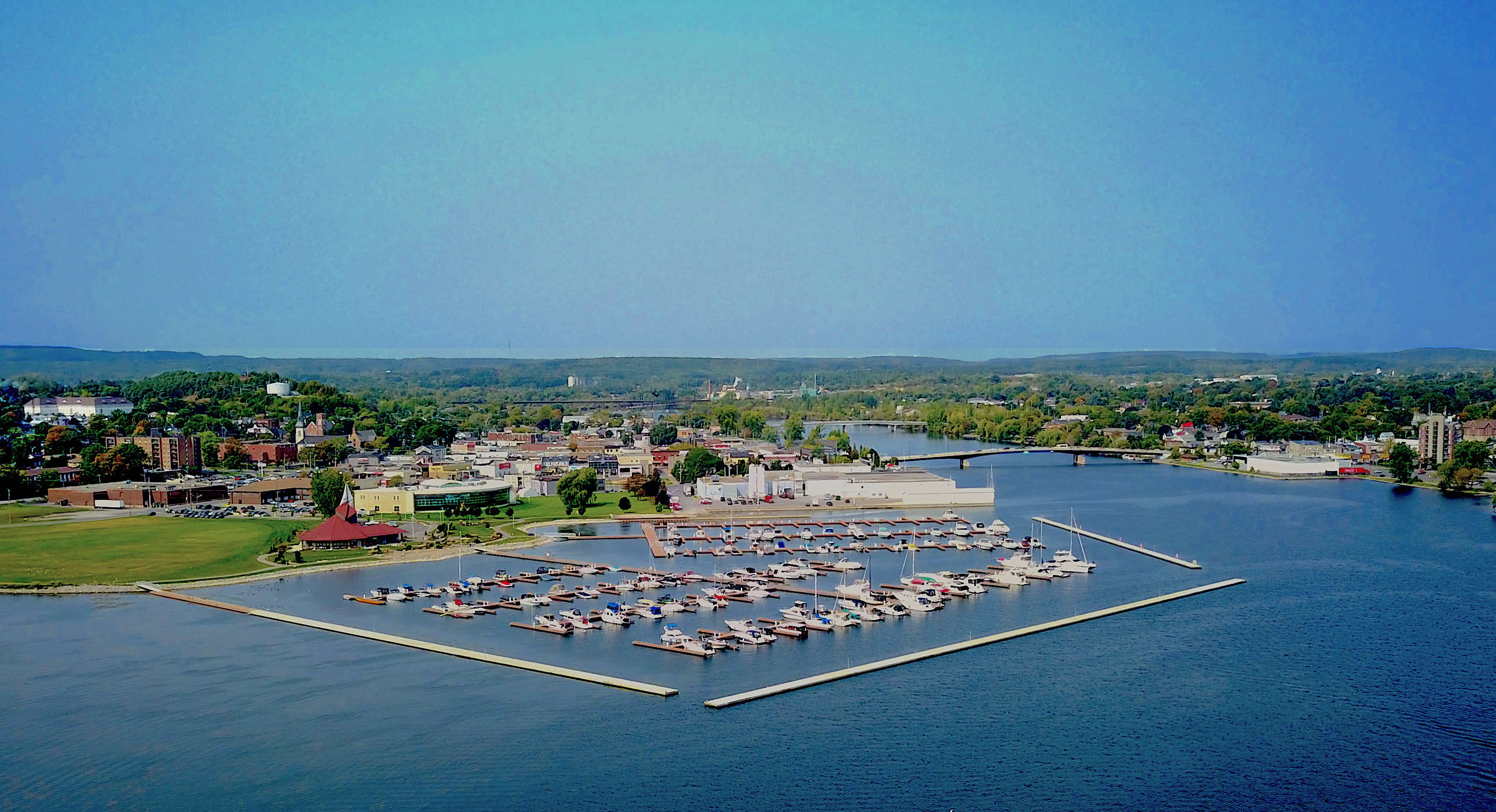
- Marina Trenton

- Coat of arms

- Location within Southern Ontario
- Coordinates: 44°11′N 77°34′W
- Country: Canada
- Province: Ontario
- County: Hastings
- Settled: 1780s
- Incorporated: 1998

Government
  - Type: City
  - Mayor: Zack Card
  - Fed. ridings: Bay of Quinte and Hastings—Lennox and Addington—Tyendinaga
  - Prov. riding: Bay of Quinte

Area
  - Land: 495.45 km^{2} (191.29 sq mi)

Population (2021)
  - Total: 46,560
  - Density: 94/km^{2} (240/sq mi)
- Time zone: UTC-5 (EST)
  - Summer (DST): UTC-4 (EDT)
- Postal code FSA: K0K, K8V
- Area codes: 613, 343
- Website: quintewest.ca

Quinte West (/ˈkwɪnti/) is a city, geographically located in but administratively separated from Hastings County, in Southern Ontario, Canada. It is on the western end of the Bay of Quinte on Lake Ontario. The Lake Ontario terminus of the Trent–Severn Waterway is in the municipality. Trenton is the largest community and serves as the administrative and commercial centre.

== History ==
Quinte West was formed on January 1, 1998, through the amalgamation of the city of Trenton, the village of Frankford and the townships of Murray and Sidney.

== Communities ==
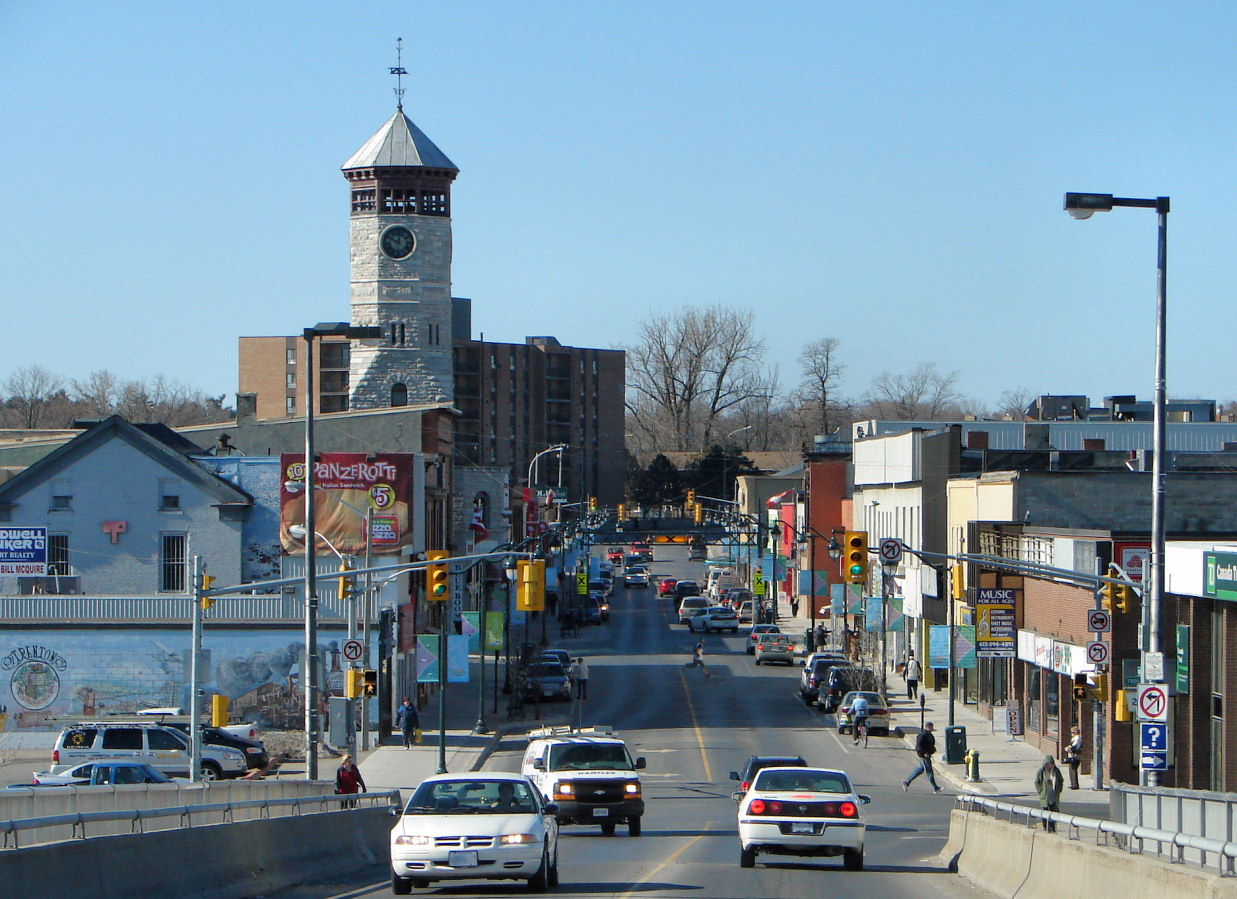
Trenton

In addition to Trenton and Frankford, the city of Quinte West also includes the following communities:

- Former Murray Township: - Trenton; Barcovan Beach, Carrying Place, German's Landing, Lovett, Maple View, Mount Zion, Roseland Acres, Stockdale, Twelve O'Clock Point, Wooler; Weller's Bay
- Former Sidney Township: - Frankford; Batawa, Bayside, Chatterton, Glenn Miller, Glen Ross, Halloway, Johnstown, Madoc Junction (southwest portion), Oak Lake, River Valley, Tuftsville (south portion), Wallbridge; South Sidney

=== Frankford ===
Frankford was first settled by Europeans in the 1820s when settler Abel Scott built a grist mill along the Trent River. The settlement went under a number of names, including Scott's Mills, Cold Creek and Manchester. The settlement was named Frankford after Sir Francis Bond Head, the Lieutenant-Governor of Upper Canada. Frankford was incorporated as a village in 1920.

== Demographics ==
In the 2021 Census of Population conducted by Statistics Canada, Quinte West had a population of 46,560 living in 19,056 of its 19,888 total private dwellings, a change of 6.8% from its 2016 population of 43,577. With a land area of 495.45 km^{2} (191.29 sq mi), it had a population density of 94.0/km^{2} (243.4/sq mi) in 2021.

At the census metropolitan area (CMA) level in the 2021 census, the Belleville-Quinte West CMA had a population of 111,184 living in 46,213 of its 48,274 total private dwellings, a change of 7.5% from its 2016 population of 103,401. With a land area of 1,337.5 km^{2} (516.4 sq mi), it had a population density of 83.1/km^{2} (215.3/sq mi) in 2021.

Canada census – Quinte West community profile

	2021	2016	2011
Population	46,560 (+6.8% from 2016)	43,577 (+1.1% from 2011)	43,086 (+0.9% from 2006)
Land area	495.45 km^{2} (191.29 sq mi)	494.02 km^{2} (190.74 sq mi)	494.15 km^{2} (190.79 sq mi)
Population density	94.0/km^{2} (243/sq mi)	88.2/km^{2} (228/sq mi)	87.2/km^{2} (226/sq mi)
Median age	45.6 (M: 44.0, F: 47.2)	44.8 (M: 43.6, F: 45.8)
Private dwellings	19,888 (total) 19,056 (occupied)	18,646 (total)	18,236 (total)
Median household income	$81,000	$66,907

References: 2021 2016 2011

Historical census populations – Quinte West
Year	Pop.	±%
2001	41,409	—
2006	42,697	+3.1%
2011	43,086	+0.9%
2016	43,577	+1.1%
2021	46,560	+6.8%
Source: Statistics Canada

=== Place of origin ===
As of 2021, 7.6% of the population of Quinte West are immigrants, 3.9% of the total population having migrated prior to 1980. 45% of the recent immigrant population migrated from Asia. Of the whole population, 4.6% of Quinte West is a visible minority.

=== Religion ===
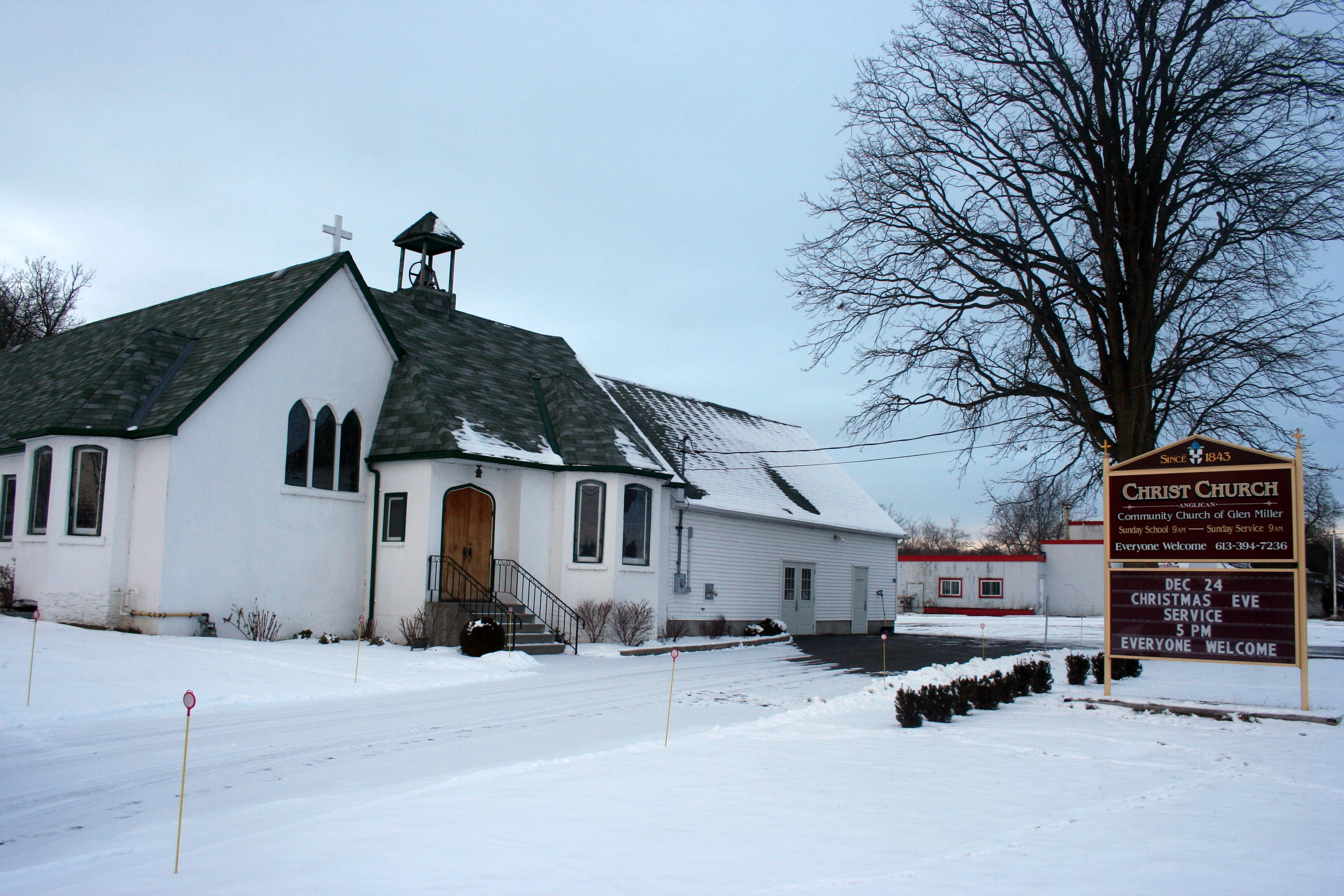
Christ Church (Anglican), Glenn Miller

The population of Trenton is largely Christian (54.3% as of 2021) and non-religious (43.8% as of 2021). Further, a small Jewish community exists in Quinte West and the surrounding area, with a synagogue operating in neighbouring Belleville. There is also a small Muslim community, with a mosque in Belleville and a recently opened mosque in Trenton.

== Economy ==
Quinte West is home to 8 Wing Trenton, the Canadian Armed Forces' primary air transportation hub. It is the area's biggest employer. 8 Wing/CFB Trenton is the largest air base in the Royal Canadian Air Force and supports Canadian Armed Forces operations around the world. Airfield services include snow removal, crash response and rescue services, 24-hour air traffic control, and a paved runway of over 10,000 feet which can accommodate a wide range of aircraft. There is a Canada Border Services Agency (CBSA) office located on site.

In May 2010, Trenton formally welcomed Toronto-based Metro Paper Industries Tissue Group set up a manufacturing facility of converted paper products at Quinte West. Earlier, this facility was operated by Pepsi Quaker Oats which was subsequently shut down.

Trenton is also home to Nestle Canada Inc., Electro Cables Inc., Globalmed Inc., Canadian Blast Freezers, Trenton Cold Storage Group, Deca Cables Inc., Domtech Inc., Drossbach North America, Fracan Ltd., L3 Communications Spar Aerospace Ltd., L3 Communications- CMRO, Norampac Inc., Quality Custom Blending, Research Casting International, SAB Group, Saputo Foods, and Quinn & Quinn Inc., just to name a few.

== Education ==
The Public school system is served by the Hastings & Prince Edward District School Board (HPEDSB), which classifies Bayside Secondary School (Quinte West) and Bayside Public School in Belleville, but they are actually geographically located in Bayside, which is a borough of Quinte West.

Public secondary schools:

- Trenton High School
- Bayside Secondary School (Trenton) French Immersion School
- École Secondaire Marc Garneau (CEPEO)

Catholic secondary school:

- St. Paul Catholic Secondary School

Public elementary schools:

- Bayside Public School
- Frankford Public School
- Murray Centennial Public School
- North Trenton Public School
- Prince Charles Public School
- Trent River Public School
- V.P. Carswell Elementary School
- École élémentaire Cité-Jeunesse (CEPEO)

Catholic elementary school:

- St. Mary Catholic School
- St. Peter Catholic School
- Sacred Heart Catholic School

French Catholic elementary school:

- École élémentaire catholique L'ENVOL

== Media ==
Trenton is the official community of licence for one radio station, CJTN-FM, although the station broadcasts from studios in Belleville. The city has its own edition of the regional community newspaper EMC, Osprey Media publishes the community newspaper The Trentonian, and CFB Trenton has its own Canadian Forces newspaper, the Contact.

== Emergency services ==
Hastings-Quinte EMS paramedics operate from a station in Trenton. Quinte West Fire Rescue provides fire and rescue services from seven stations located throughout the municipality. The Trenton fire station is staffed by a combination of full-time and volunteer / paid-on-call firefighters, while the remaining six stations are fully volunteer. Police services are provided by the Ontario Provincial Police under contract. The OPP operates a detachment in Trenton.
