= Centennial Secondary School (Belleville, Ontario) =

Location
- 160 Palmer Rd. Belleville, Ontario, K8P 4E1; Canada; 44°9′25″N 77°24′21″W

Information
- Established: c. February 1967
- School board: Hastings & Prince Edward District School Board
- Principal: Andrew Ross
- Grades: 7-12
- Enrollment: 910
- Average class size: 19
- Language: English
- Hours in school day: 6.25
- Colours: Green & Yellow
- Slogan: Exceeding Expectations
- Team name: Chargers
- Website: css.hpedsb.on.ca

Centennial Secondary School is a publicly funded high school in Belleville, Ontario, Canada. The school is part of the Hastings & Prince Edward District School Board. Centennial prides itself on its "Double A" rating, specializing in Arts, Academics and Athletics. The school is also recognized as the regional school for Visual and Performing Arts. As of the 2018-19 academic year, Centennial has an enrolment of 910 students.

== Facilities ==
Centennial Secondary School was opened in 1967, and named as such because of Canada's centennial in the same year. The school features a large triple gymnasium, weight room and fitness facility. The music department has a fully equipped music room, a recording facility, as well as a mini computer lab. The art department showcases work in the student art gallery, and also boasts two fully equipped art studios and a digital photography room for students. Centennial is also home to an 801-seat auditorium, which is used by the school as well as other groups within the Hastings and Prince Edward District School Board. In addition, Centennial Secondary School has specialized facilities for computer engineering, hospitality, construction, automotive and manufacturing, information technology and a fully operational greenhouse. The school has undergone renovations in the past decade, adding numerous windows to classrooms.

== Academics ==
Students at Centennial Secondary School will find a wide range of academic opportunities. The school offers various areas of study in arts, physical education, sciences, technology, and social sciences. Students from Centennial have long participated in board and province wide academic events, including Model UN conferences and Science and Technology Fairs. Centennial Secondary School also has a wide variety of technology courses. The school focuses on strong academic achievement and aims to provide valuable opportunities for students to improve and further develop literacy and numeracy skills.

== Arts Program ==
=== Musical Theatre ===
Centennial Secondary School also performs a major musical theatre production annually; with combined efforts from the dramatic, musical and visual arts departments. These productions are viewable by members of the public, and the revenue is used to fund further development of the arts programs at the school.

=== Arts Credit ===
Students at Centennial also have the option of participating in a school board exclusive arts program, which gives students interested in the arts the ability to take up to 3 arts credits in one year. Students must first apply and get accepted into the program. Students who participate in the program throughout their high school career are also eligible to receive an arts high skills major diploma. Art teacher Christine Christos leads the department.

== Notable alumni ==
- Riyo Mori - Miss Universe 2007
- Karl Svoboda - Canadian rugby player

== See also ==
- Education in Ontario
- List of secondary schools in Ontario
