= Stirling-Rawdon =

- Township (lower-tier)
- Township of Stirling-Rawdon
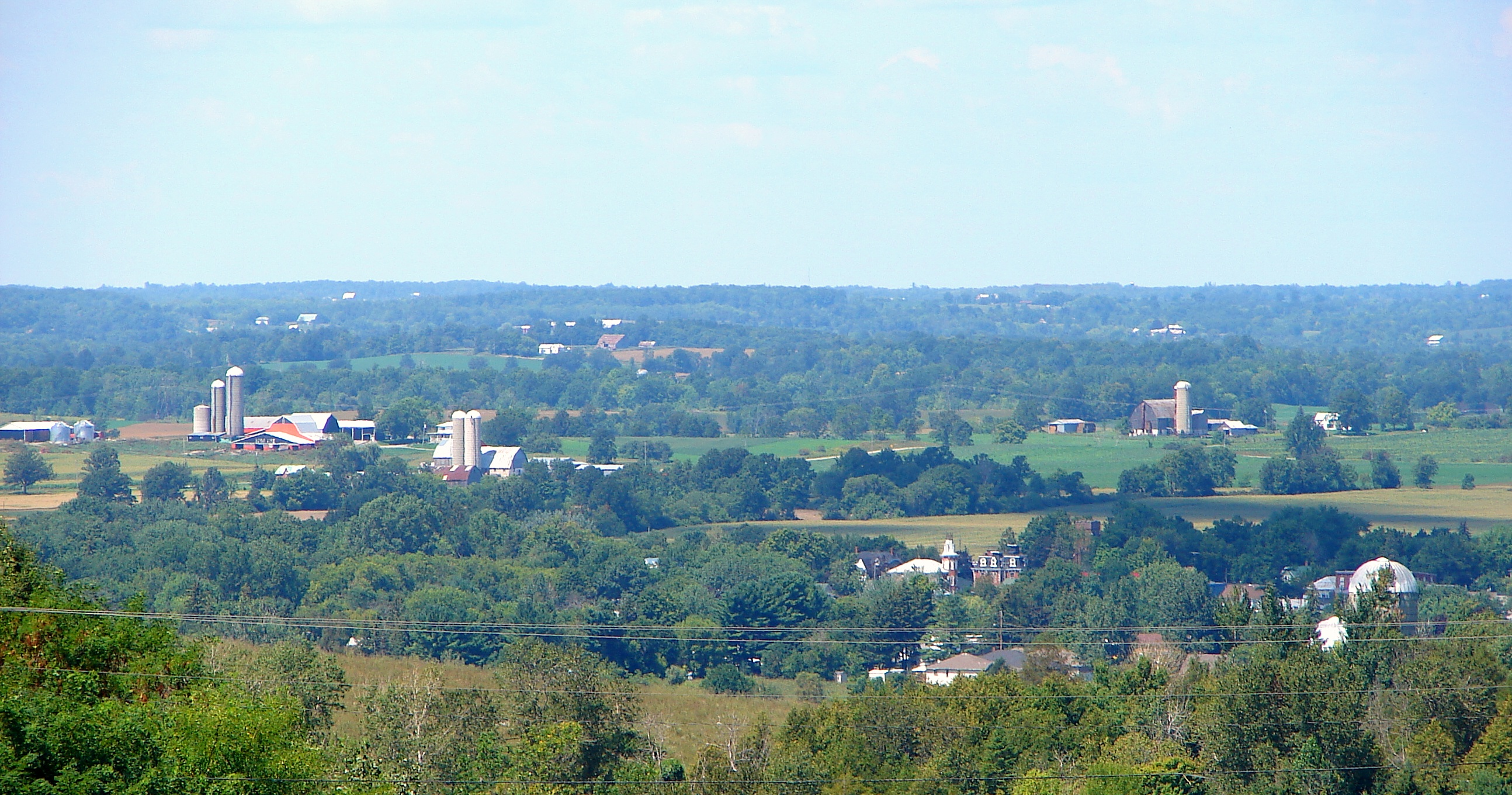

- Location within Southern Ontario
- Coordinates: 44°22′N 77°35.5′W
- Country: Canada
- Province: Ontario
- County: Hastings
- Formed: January 1, 1998

Government
  - Type: Municipality (Township)
  - Mayor: Bob Mullin
  - Fed. riding: Hastings—Lennox and Addington—Tyendinaga
  - Prov. riding: Hastings—Lennox and Addington

Area
  - Land: 282.48 km^{2} (109.07 sq mi)

Population (2021)
  - Total: 5,015
  - Density: 17.8/km^{2} (46/sq mi)
- Time zone: UTC-5 (EST)
  - Summer (DST): UTC-4 (EDT)
- Postal code FSA: K0K
- Area codes: 613 and 343
- Website: www.stirling-rawdon.com

Stirling-Rawdon is a township in the Canadian province of Ontario, located in Hastings County. It was formed on January 1, 1998, through the amalgamation of Rawdon Township with the Village of Stirling.

Stirling was named the 2012 Kraft Hockeyville winner, after gaining more than 3.9 million votes.

== Geography ==
The area around Stirling is made up of farmlands with some forests heavily in sporadic areas with some hills. Rawdon Creek flows near the village centre, the Marsh Creek is to the west and the Trent River with the Trent Canal in the southwest. Its main industry is agriculture with some other businesses. The attractions are River Valley and Stirling's nearby lake Oak Lake which lies south of the community.

=== Communities ===
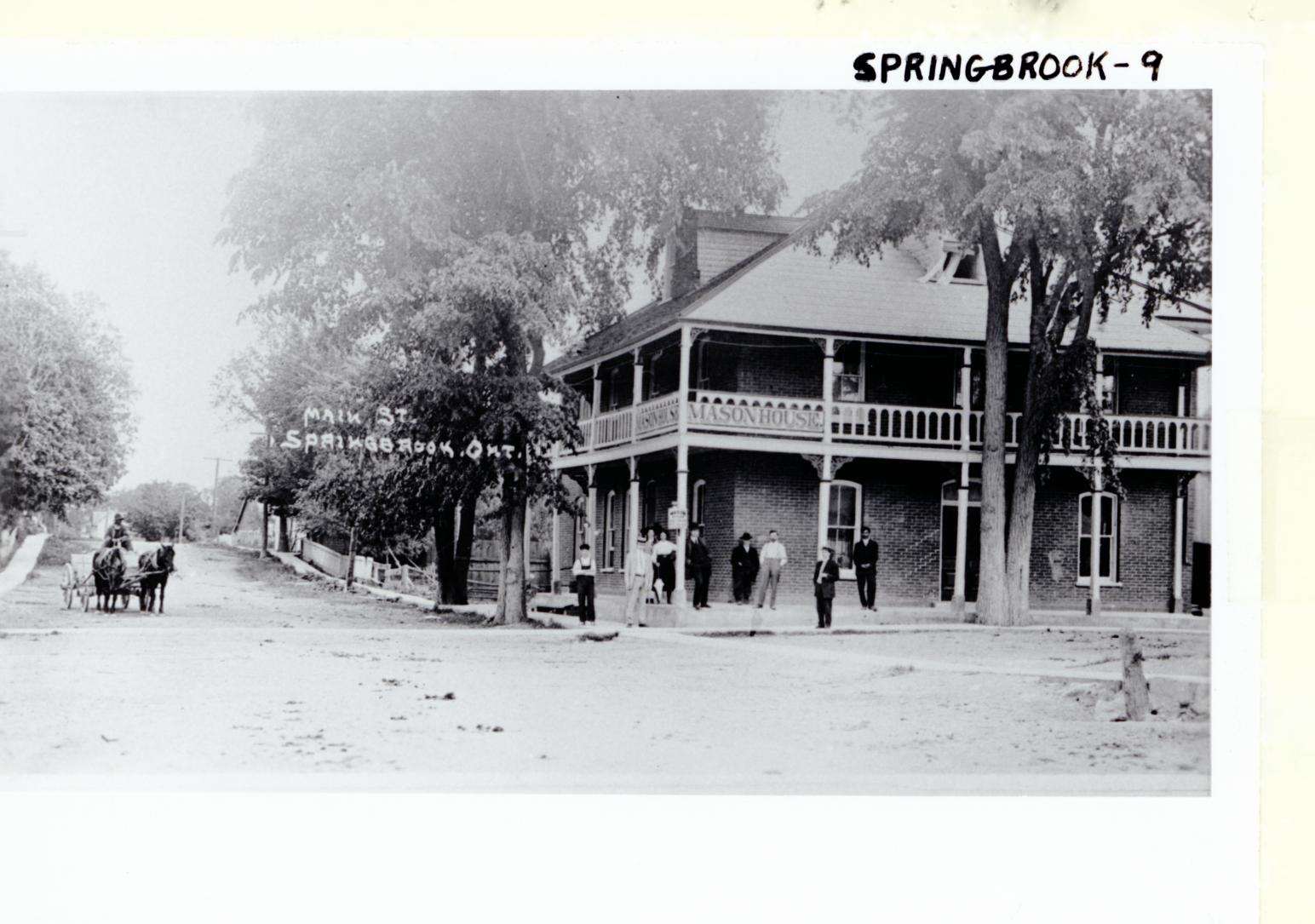
Mason House, Main Street, Springbrook (c. 1910)

Besides the village proper of Stirling, the township of Stirling-Rawdon comprises a number of villages and hamlets, including the following communities such as Anson, Bonarlaw, Harold, Minto, Mount Pleasant, Sine, Springbrook, Wellman; Brinkworth, Madoc Junction, Peterson, Rylstone, Sarginson, Wellman Station

==== Bonarlaw ====
Bonarlaw (44°25′50″N 77°37′40″W) is located north of Springbrook on County Road 14. Bonarlaw is named for British Prime Minister Bonar Law. The community was formerly known as Big Springs and Bellview. Bonarlaw has an Anglican church, St. Marks, which is located at the intersection of highway 14 and St. Marks Road. It was built in 1933 and is the second church on the site.

The Canadian Pacific Havelock Subdivision crossed the Canadian National Maynooth subdivision at grade just west of highway 14. The Maynooth railway line has been abandoned and has been converted to recreational/snowmobile trails. CP Ottawa-Toronto trains called at Bonarlaw station as late as 1964.

==== Stirling ====
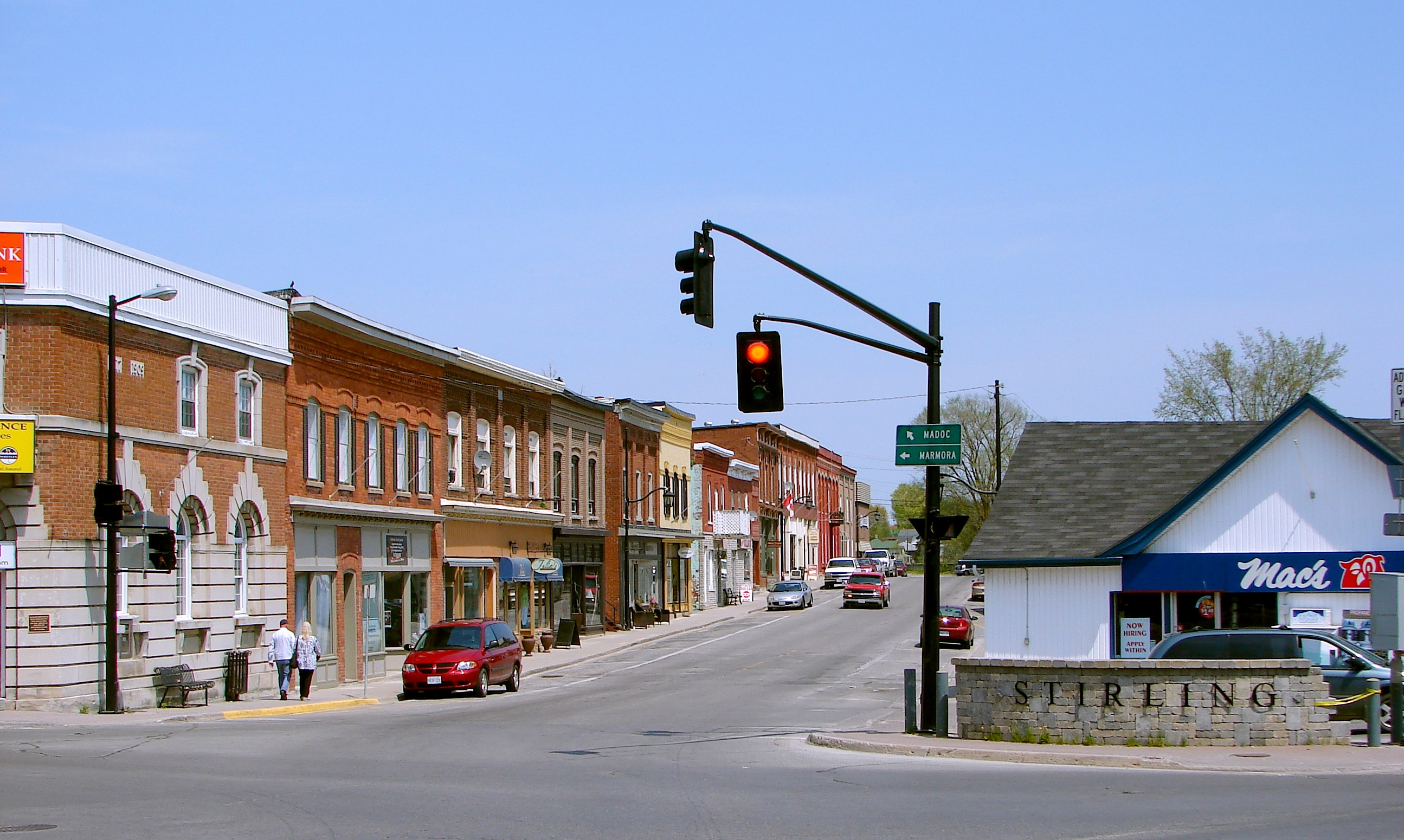
Stirling

Stirling (44.300°N 77.550°W) is located northeast of Trenton and north of Belleville. The village accounts for a significant share of the township's entire population. The village of Stirling has a population of 2,074 in the 2021 census in an area of 3.03 square kilometres (1.17 sq mi), having a density of 684.5/km^{2} (1,772.8/sq mi). Up until October 12, 2017, Stirling-Rawdon had the smallest recognized police force in Ontario, with eight police officers and one police chief. They have since transitioned to the Ontario Provincial Police.

Stirling is named for Stirling, Scotland, "because the first settlers thought that the surrounding countryside resembled Stirlingshire" (CPCGN files). Post office dates from 1852.

In 2008, the village of Stirling celebrated its 150th anniversary.

===== Kraft Hockeyville =====
Kraft Hockeyville was awarded to Stirling in March 2012 with 3.9 million votes over participating communities across Canada.

The theme of Stirling Hockeyville 2012, organized by chairperson Cindy Brandt, was “Play together...Stay Together.” After the death of the 25-year arena manager Barry Wilson in the spring of 2011, the community decided to fulfill his mission of improving the Stirling District Recreation Centre.

As a result of winning the competition, the Toronto Maple Leafs and Columbus Blue Jackets were scheduled to play an NHL pre-season game in Stirling in September 2012. Arrangements were made to accommodate these teams in the Yardmen Arena in Belleville, Ontario, but the game was eventually cancelled due to the 2012 NHL lockout. As a form of compensation, Stirling hosted a pre-season game between the Washington Capitals and Winnipeg Jets at Yardmen Arena on September 14, 2013.

== Demographics ==
In the 2021 Census of Population conducted by Statistics Canada, Stirling-Rawdon had a population of 5,015 living in 1,971 of its 2,074 total private dwellings, a change of 2.7% from its 2016 population of 4,882. With a land area of 282.48 km^{2} (109.07 sq mi), it had a population density of 17.8/km^{2} (46.0/sq mi) in 2021.

Canada census – Stirling-Rawdon community profile

	2021	2016	2011
Population	5,015 (+2.7% from 2016)	4,882 (-1.9% from 2011)	4,978 (+1.5% from 2006)
Land area	282.48 km^{2} (109.07 sq mi)	282.33 km^{2} (109.01 sq mi)	282.31 km^{2} (109.00 sq mi)
Population density	17.8/km^{2} (46/sq mi)	17.3/km^{2} (45/sq mi)	17.6/km^{2} (46/sq mi)
Median age	46.4 (M: 45.2, F: 48.4)	46.2 (M: 44.4, F: 47.7)
Private dwellings	2,074 (total) 1,971 (occupied)	2,029 (total) 1,896 (occupied)	1,998 (total)
Median household income	$81,000	$66,752

References: 2021 2016 2011

Historical census populations – Stirling-Rawdon
Year	Pop.	±%
2001	4,887	—
2006	4,906	+0.4%
2011	4,978	+1.5%
2016	4,882	−1.9%
2021	5,015	+2.7%
Source: Statistics Canada

== Tourism ==
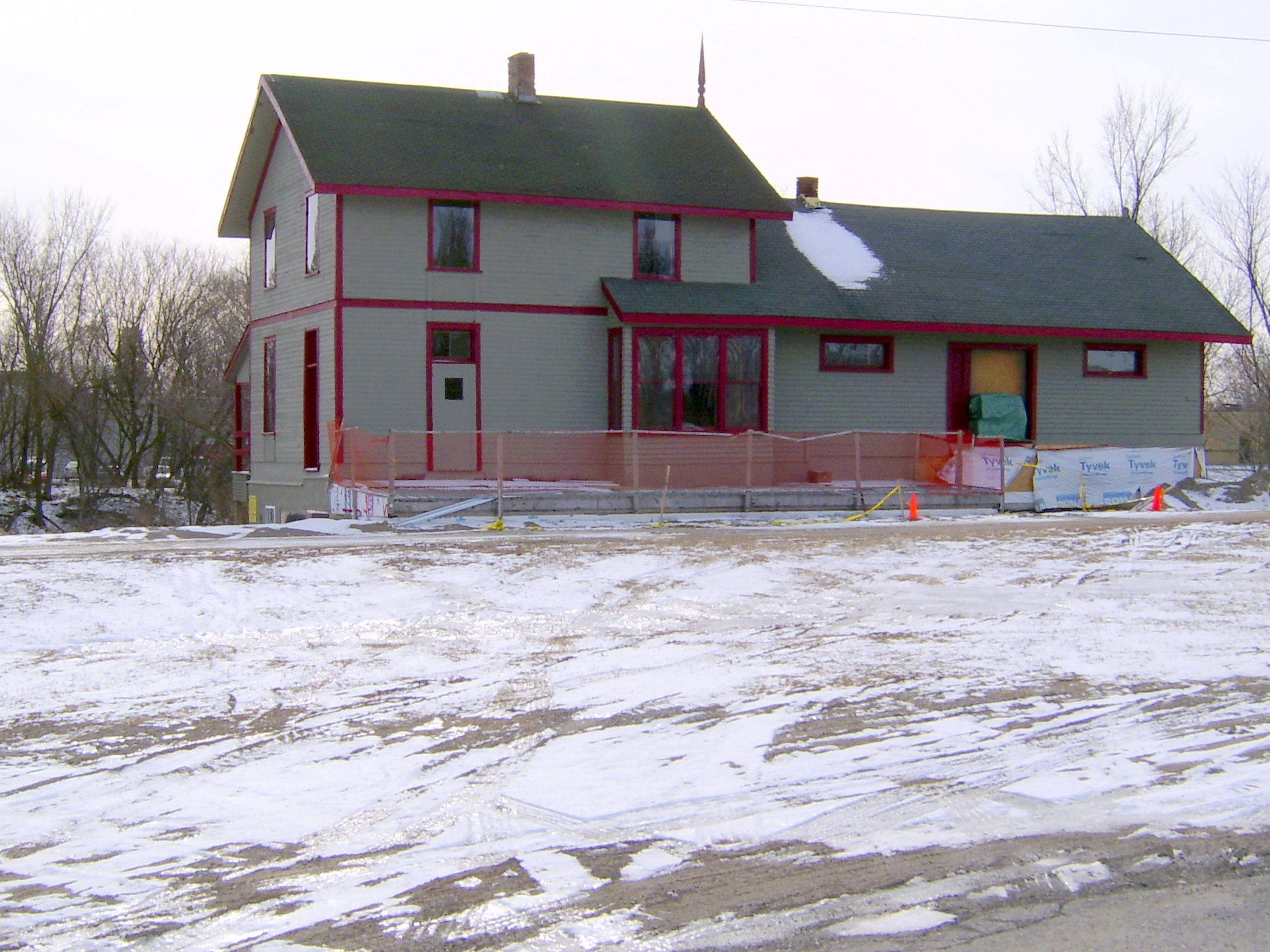
Stirling Station

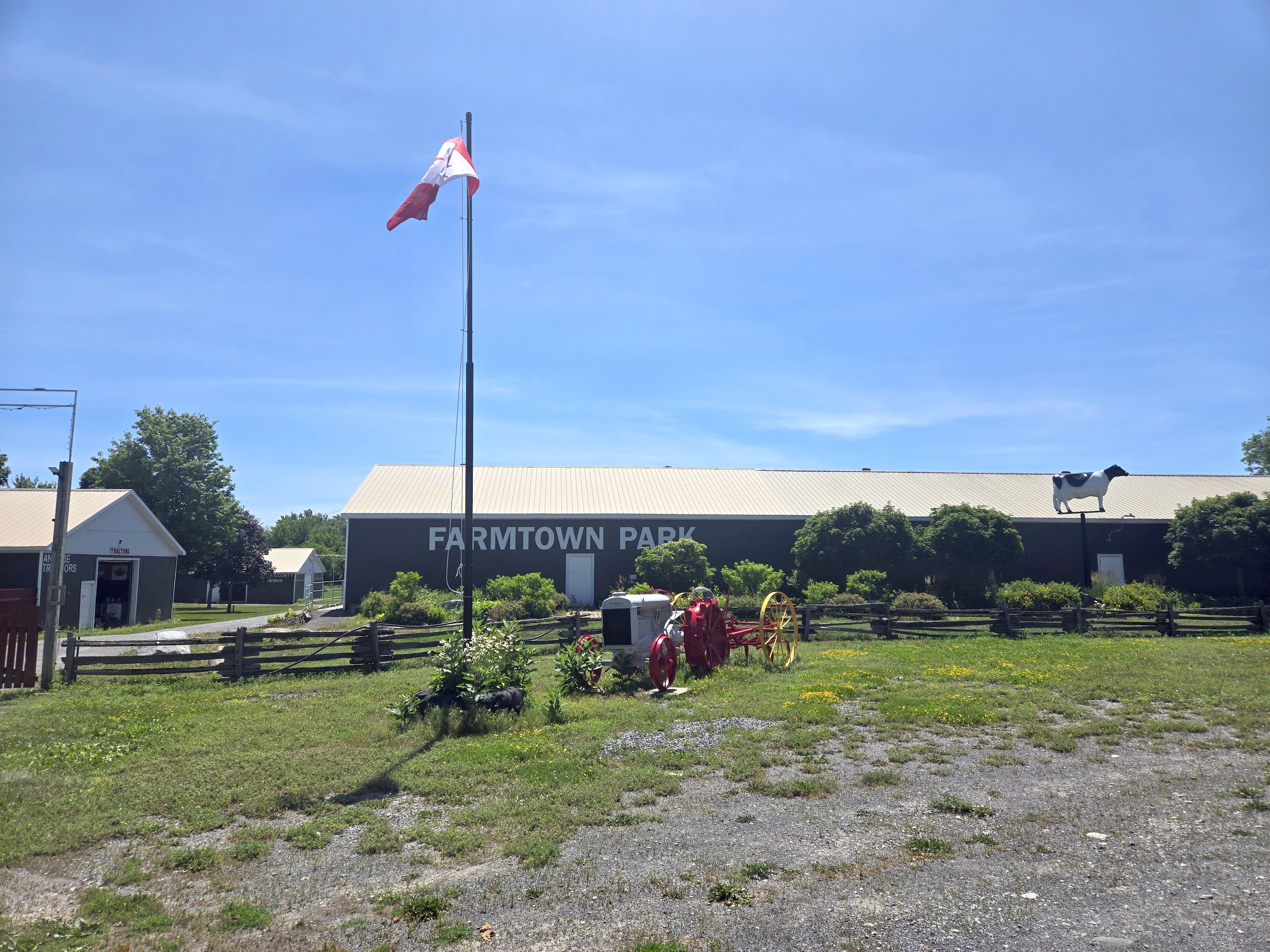
Farmtown Park

Farmtown Park, previously known as the Hasting County Museum of Agricultural Heritage, was opened in 1997 and has nine buildings that reflect upon the agricultural heritage of the area. Open between Victoria Day and the end of September, some highlights include the dairy museum, steam engine display, tractor building, harvest building and Heritage Village streetscape.

Stirling also boasts a popular hometown theatre which was opened in 1927, but it was hardly used until the formation of the Stirling Performing Arts Committee in 1982. The theatre is home to yearly pantomimes, musicals, comedy shows, and more.

The Stirling Grand Trunk Railway Station was refurbished in 2008 for the town's 150th Anniversary celebrations. Situated along the old Grand Junction Railway of Canada Belleville to Peterborough line, this architectural piece of history hosts museum tours and visitor information sessions seasonally between Victoria Day weekend and Labour Day.

== Education ==
The village of Stirling is home to one elementary school belonging to the Hastings and Prince Edward District School Board. This school includes grades kindergarten to 8. This school is now open as of November 2013. The town of Stirling does not have a high school, so grade 9 students generally attend Bayside Secondary School (Quinte West) or St. Theresa Catholic Secondary School in Belleville, with a small number also attending Centre Hastings Secondary School.

== Notable people ==
People associated with Stirling include NHL players Rob Ray, Matt Cooke, Eric Manlow and Atlanta Thrashers scout Mark Dobson.

== See also ==
- List of townships in Ontario
