= Bayside Secondary School =

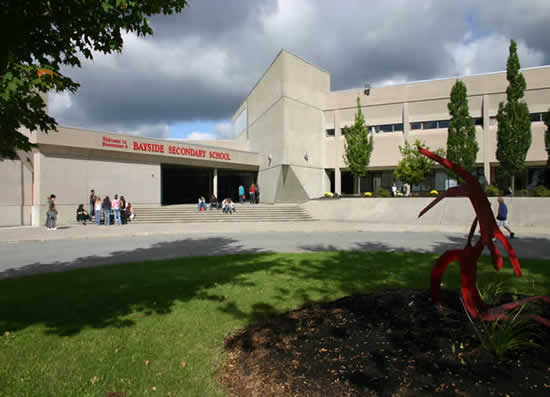

Location
- 1247 Old Highway 2 Quinte West, Ontario, K8N 4Z2; Canada; 44°07′32″N 77°28′39″W

Information
- School type: Public, high school
- Founded: September 1971
- School board: Hastings & Prince Edward District School Board
- Superintendent: Colleen DeMille
- Area trustee: Jim Williams
- School number: 893803
- Principal: Mike McKeown
- Grades: 7-12
- Enrollment: 960 (September 2023)
- Language: English; French immersion
- Colour
- Mascot: Red Devil
- Team name: Bayside Red Devils
- Website: edu.hpedsb.on.ca/bss/

Bayside Secondary School is a high school in Quinte West, Ontario, Canada and is part of the Hastings & Prince Edward District School Board. It is one of the largest high schools by area in North America.

Bayside offers grades 7-12 and is the Hastings & Prince Edward District School Board site for secondary French Immersion. Other specialty programs include International Studies, Communication Technology and Manufacturing Technology. The 200-acre (0.81 km^{2}) campus which includes a quarry, a woods and a bayshore area, offers environmental science programs, outdoor physical education activities and geographical studies. A full range of extra curricular activities is offered such as male and female interschool sports, improv team and intramurals.

The school has seven computer labs and specialized programs including Advanced Placement, Musical Theater and NET Solutions (a three credit course offering opportunities in computer programming and engineering).

Bayside is known for the wide array of events that is held throughout the year that include the Reindeer Hunt, the Holiday Extravaganza, the annual spring Talent Show and the year-end Barbecue.

== Athletics ==
=== Clubs and teams ===
Bayside is renowned across the Bay of Quinte area for their athletic programs, boasting some of the best Soccer, Tennis, Rugby, and Swimming programs in the province. The teams compete in the Bay of Quinte Division, of the Central Ontario Secondary Schools Association (COSSA); one of the 18 Associations governed by OFSAA. Bayside is a "AA" sports school. Their mascot is the Red Devil, and their sport teams carry the same name; the women colloquially use "She-Devils" for their team names. The following is a list of the sports clubs and teams offered at the school:

Fall

- Boys Soccer (Junior and Senior)
- In 2026 both Junior and Senior boys soccer teams won the BOQ CHAMPIONSHIPS & the COSSA CHAMPIONSHIPS. With their win the Senior RED DEVILS advance to AA OFSSA in Owen Sound in June 2027
- 2027 Bayside Red Devils FC OFSSA roster Kenny Madge Chase Covell Lucas Lemaire Kem Kemka Isaac Kerr Ophel Tcheutou Jan Volkmann Andrew Dewar Kamden Bridger Viktor Pizzino Sean Babakharheil Chase Seniuk Anderson Mol Aiden Windover Alex Giroux-Gagne Jonathon Tinney Lucas Kotsovos Carlos Pedraz
- Boys Football (Junior and Senior)
- Girls Rugby Union (Junior and Senior)
- Co-ed Cross Country Running (Midget, Junior, and Senior)
- Girls Basketball (Junior and Senior)
- Boys Volleyball (Junior and Senior)
- Boys & Girls Golf (Varsity)

Winter

- Boys & Girls Ice Hockey (Varsity)
- Boys Basketball (Junior and Senior)
- Boys & Girls Wrestling (Varsity)
- Co-ed Swimming (Junior & Senior)
- Boys & Girls Curling
- Boys & Girls Badminton

Spring

- Girls Soccer (Junior and Senior) - known as "Bayside FC"
- Boys Rugby Union (Junior and Senior)
- Co-ed Track and Field (Midget, Junior, and Senior)
- Boys & Girls Tennis
- Co-ed Ultimate Frisbee (Varsity)

=== Athletic Council ===
In 2012, the Athletic Council was reestablished, representing the views of athletes to staff, organizing sporting events and planning trips for the students.

=== Student Council ===
The Student Council works to make events like the Reindeer Hunt, the Holiday Extravaganza and the year-end Barbecue happen.

== See also ==
- Education in Ontario
- List of secondary schools in Ontario
