= Madoc, Ontario (village) =

Madoc
- Unincorporated community
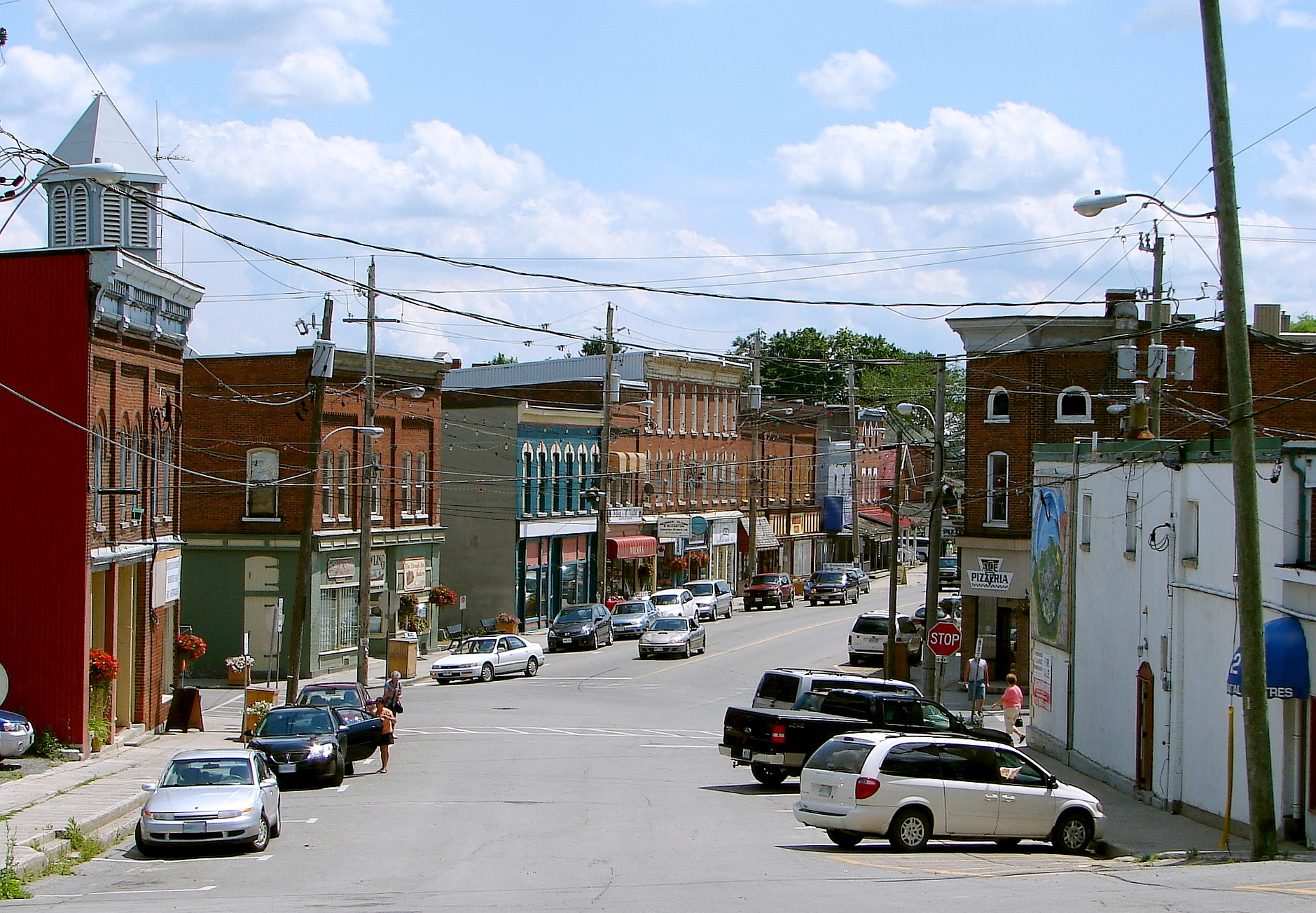
- Durham Street

- Location within Southern Ontario
- Coordinates: 44°30′20″N 77°28′20″W
- Country: Canada
- Province: Ontario
- County: Hastings
- Municipality: Centre Hastings
- Founded: 1832
- Incorporated: 1877
- Dissolved (amalgamated): January 1, 1998

Area
  - Land: 2.19 km^{2} (0.85 sq mi)

Population (2021)
  - Total: 1,489
  - Density: 680.2/km^{2} (1,762/sq mi)
- Time zone: UTC-5 (EST)
  - Summer (DST): UTC-4 (EDT)
- Postal code: K0K 2K0
- Area code: 613

Madoc /ˈmeɪdɒk/ is a community in the municipality of Centre Hastings, Hastings County, Ontario, Canada. It is located at the junction of Highway 7 and Highway 62, southeast of Bancroft, halfway between Toronto and Ottawa.

== History ==
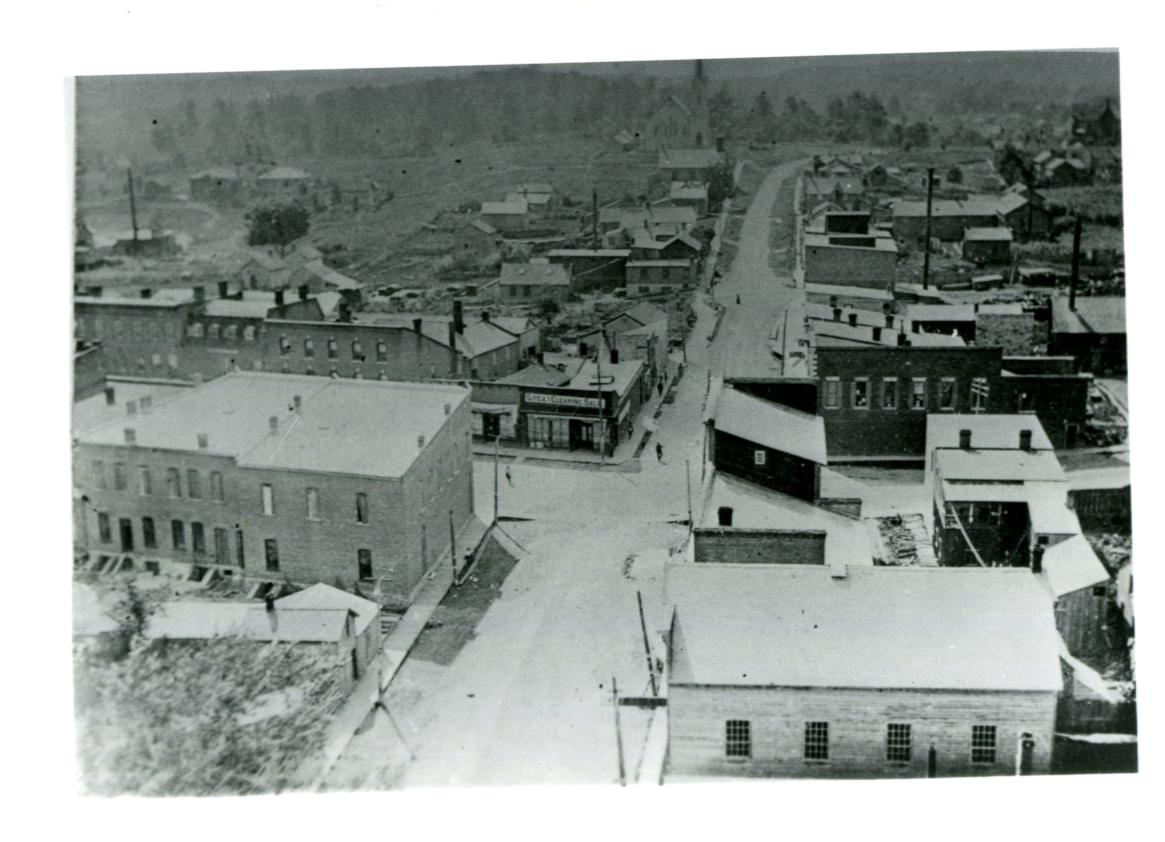
Madoc, 1880

Madoc was originally named MacKenzie's Mills after Donald MacKenzie, who built a sawmill and grist mill here around 1832. Its post office opened in 1836. It was briefly named Hastings but was renamed Madoc Township after the legendary Welsh prince Madoc ap Owain Gwynedd, credited by some with discovering North America in 1170. When people traveled by horse and carriage during the 19th century from Toronto to Ottawa, Madoc was the halfway stop over, allowing the passengers and horses to rest. In 1854, the Hastings Colonization Road was completed, which led to increased development of the hamlet. Also, the first, and one of the largest meteorites in Canada was discovered in Madoc in 1854, and was called the "Madoc meteorite". The community separated from the namesake township in 1877, and remained an incorporated municipality until 1998.

The area has a rich mining history. Gold was discovered at nearby Eldorado in 1866. Fluorite was extracted from the area during the 1930s and 1940s. The talc mine, under the name Canada Talc (Cantalc), that was in production in Madoc for almost 114 years by 2010 is now shutting down. It is one of only three mines in the world that has been in steady operation for more than one hundred years.

On January 25, 1998, the Village of Madoc amalgamated with Huntingdon Township to form Centre Hastings. Madoc is the largest community in the municipality. Its post office services locals with lock boxes and rural routes.

In 2008, Madoc celebrated its 130th anniversary.

== Demographics ==
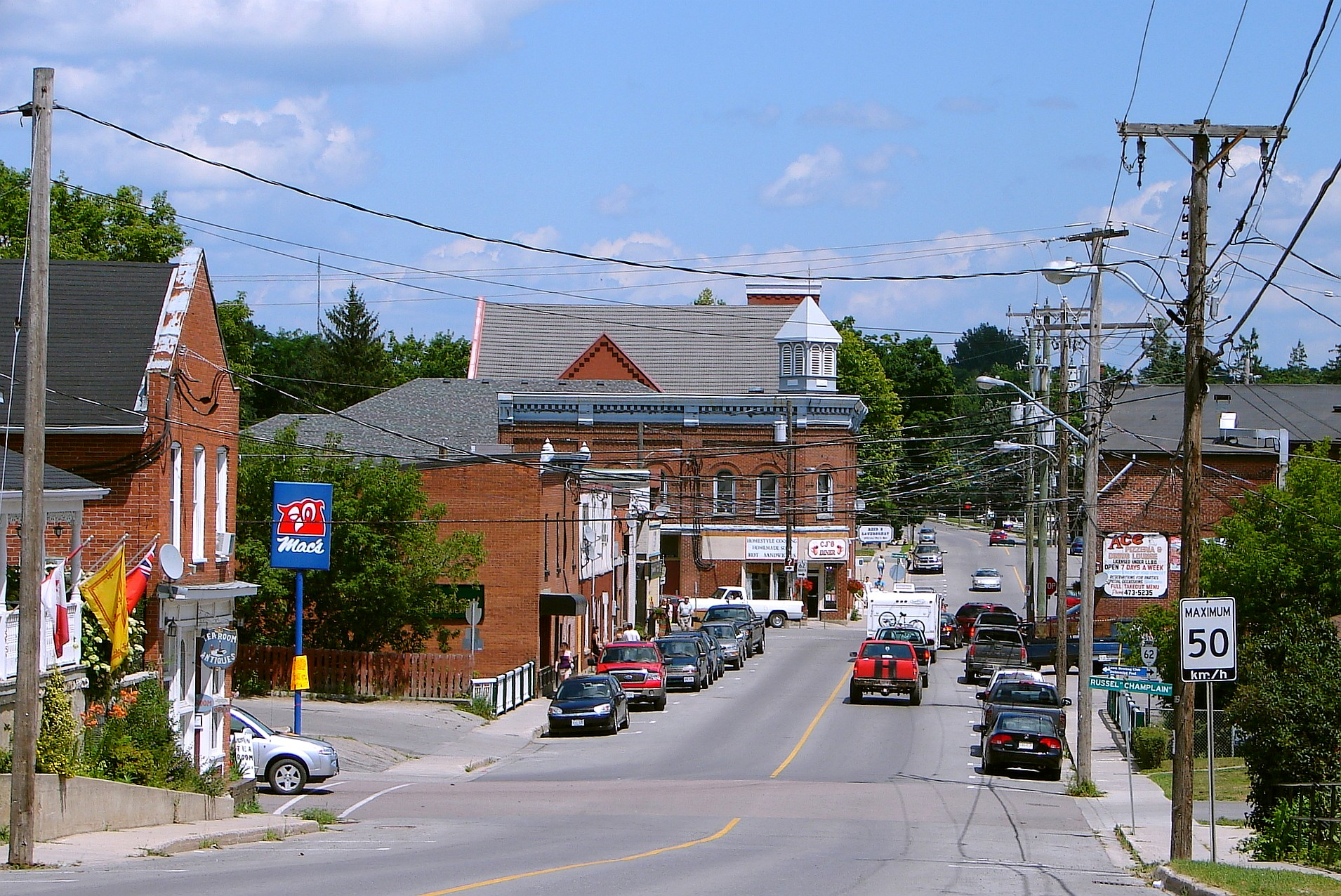
Madoc, St. Lawrence Street

Historical census populations – Madoc (Population centre)

Year	Pop.	±%
1881	1,065	—
1891	1,134	+6.5%
1901	1,157	+2.0%
1911	1,058	−8.6%
1921	1,058	+0.0%
1931	1,059	+0.1%
1941	1,188	+12.2%
1951	1,240	+4.4%

Year	Pop.	±%
1956	1,325	+6.9%
1961	1,347	+1.7%
1966	1,385	+2.8%
1971	1,353	−2.3%
1976	1,363	+0.7%
1981	1,249	−8.4%
1986	1,255	+0.5%
1991	1,397	+11.3%

Year	Pop.	±%
1996	1,464	+4.8%
2001	1,375	−6.1%
2006	1,435	+4.4%
2011	1,475	+2.8%
2016	1,535	+4.1%
2021	1,489	−3.0%

Population counts prior to 1998 are for Madoc (Village). Population counts are not adjusted for boundary changes.
Source: Statistics Canada

== Attractions ==
O'Hara Mill Homestead and Conservation Area features the O'Hara Sawmill. It is reputedly the only water-powered upright frame saw left in Ontario. It has been restored to operating condition by volunteers and is a centre piece of the revitalized homestead and conservation area. Being near the junction of highways 7 and 62, it offers an intriguing rest stop to travellers.

The village has a premier skateboard park with splash pad, canteen, night-time lighting with bleachers and performing arts centre with music stage made from straw-bale construction.

An outdoor public swimming pool is located at 65 Queen Victoria St. W. in Madoc. It is run through the Municipality of Centre Hastings.

A public boat launch at Moira Lake South of the town offers a boat launch, swimming and a beachfront. As of 2013 a boat launch revitalization project has started, led by Madoc Kiwanis Club and will feature a new boat launch, boat ramp and docking area and marshland boardwalk, safe swimming area and more parking.

The Tim Hortons restaurant in Madoc pours more than 3,000 cups of coffee a day, making it one of the busiest within the chain.

The Tri-Lakes Medical Centre opened in Madoc in June 2009.

== Notable people ==
People born here include:

- Allan Roy Dafoe, delivered and cared for the Dionne Quintuplets.
- Colin Scott Dafoe, surgeon with Marshall Josip Broz Tito's Partisans in Yugoslavia during the Second World War.
- John Weir Foote, awarded the Victoria Cross.
