= List of proposed Canadian national flags =

The following is a list of flags proposed for the Canadian state. This list focuses mainly on flag proposals appearing in contemporary print media. For more submissions to Parliamentary Flag committees by the public, see List of national flag proposals#Canada. See also FOTW.info

Flag	Date	Use	Description
	1895	Sir Donald A. Smith's proposal	A British colonial Red Ensign with green maple leaf in lower fly.
	1895	Sir Sanford Fleming's proposal	A British colonial Red Ensign with a seven-pointed white star in the lower fly that represents the North Star as emblem of Canada its rays symbolizing its then seven provinces.
	1895	H. Spencer Howell of the Canadian Club of Hamilton, Ontario's proposal	A British colonial Red Ensign with green maple leaf on white disc in lower fly.
	1895	George S. Hodgins's proposal	A British colonial Red Ensign with green maple leaf on an eared-top shield with pointed base in the fly.
	~1895 / 1897	G. E. Dawson's / Barlow Cumberland's proposal	A British Red Ensign featuring a green maple leaf on a white diamond (lozenge) in the fly. Barlow Cumberland advocated an identical design in their The Story of the Union Jack (1897), but did not credit Dawson. Cumberland stated the diamond is to commemorate the Diamond Jubilee of Queen Victoria and to distinguish the flag among other British colonial ensigns.
	1896	E. M. Chadwick's proposals	A British Blue Ensign with three conjoined maple leaves in gold as emblem on the fly.
	1896	E. M. Chadwick's proposals	A British Red Ensign with three conjoined maple leaves in gold as badge on the fly.
	1896	E. M. Chadwick's proposals	A British Blue Ensign with three conjoined maple leaves in red on a white disc as badge on the fly.
	1896	E. M. Chadwick's proposals	A British Red Ensign with three conjoined maple leaves in green on a white disc as badge on the fly.
	1902	Design reported in the Daily Express to have been proposed as part of a series of Empire flags that would replace the Union Jack in representing individual territories of the British Empire	The Cross of Saint George and the crown in the canton would have been present on all Empire flags to represent the English. In the top right would be the emblem of the territory flying the flag, and in this case, the coat of arms of Canada. A large sun in the centre symbolizes "the empire on which the sun never sets."
	1909	Col. C. F. Hamilton's proposal	A British ensign with plain white field and Union Jack canton. Proposed by Col. C. F. Hamilton, a journalist and intelligence officer, in 1909. The white field was intended to make the flag distinctive among British ensigns, recognizable at a distance, to evoke Canada's natural geography, and to recognize the French contribution to the nation.
	1916-21	Manitoba Free Press Proposal	Design inspired by the Australian flag. A British ensign with a white field and eight blue stars placed upon the field—seven smaller stars arranged in the form of the Big Dipper/Great Bear and one larger representing the North Star.
	~1921	J. S. Ewart's Proposal	A Union Jack defaced by a white shield charged with a red maple leaf. Design attributed to J. S. Ewart by the Star Weekly of 2 July 1921, and described as "put forward some years ago".
	1921	Edwin J. Cox's Proposal	On a white field, large maple leaf filled in by design of the British Union Jack, or a Union Jack clipped by the outline of a maple leaf. Submitted by Cox to the Manitoba Free Press.
	1920s	Minnie H. Bowen's Proposal	Design featuring the white cross of France on a red field with Union Jack in canton, submitted to PM Mackenzie King's 1925 flag committee. A similar redesign of the red and blue ensigns of Canada was considered by PM Sir Robert Borden's 1919 arms committee.
	1925	Archer Fortescue Duguid's Proposal	Proposed by Archer Fortescue Duguid as a "Canadian National Flag for Use Ashore" in June 1925. In 1939, the design was adopted as the headquarters flag of the 1st Division of the Canadian Army on the eve of their departure for Europe to serve in the Second World War. It served as the de facto, provisional flag of the Army until officially replaced by the Canadian Red Ensign in 1944. Duguid re-proposed the design as national flag in 1939 at the time it was adopted as the flag of the 1st Canadian Division and, despite the fact that it did not find favor with the troops, again in 1945.
	1925	William S. Simpson's Proposal	A British Red Ensign charged with eight small white five-pointed stars, seven to form the asterism the Big Dipper and the last positioned to represent the North Star. A veteran, Simpson presented the flag to veterans groups and entered the flag into a 1925 competition organized by the Native Sons of Canada. Following the 1927 adoption of a similar design by Benny Benson for the Flag of Alaska, Simpson argued publicly that the design of the latter was based on his own.
	1926	Winner of the 1926 La Presse contest to design a national flag. Design credited concurrently to Edwin Tappan Adney, Charles Lapierre, Joseph-Edouard Roy, and Isidore Renaud.	A white field with Union Jack canton and figurative green maple leaf on the fly. White field recalls the first, "heroic" period of Canada under monarchical France, the Union Jack symbolizes loyalty to Great Britain, and the green maple leaf concretizes the present history of Canada and its aspirations. Design submitted to the 1945-46 Parliamentary flag committee and one of the last to be eliminated from consideration.
	1928	W. A. W. Hames's Proposal	A field of nine vertical bars or stripes—four white, three red, and two blue—with Union Jack canton defaced with centered green maple leaf. The nine bars represent the Provinces of Canada: the four white the four founding provinces of Ontario, Quebec, New Brunswick, Nova Scotia; the red three provinces of Prince Edward Island, British Columbia, and Manitoba; and the two blue the last to then join Alberta and Saskatchewan. Design submitted to and endorsed by the Courtenay Assembly of the Native Sons of Canada.
	1929	Mrs. H. E. Dunford's Proposal	A red field charged with a symmetric white cross and Union Jack canton, nine green maple leaves arranged cross-wise upon the white cross. The nine maple leaves represent the Provinces of Canada, with space left for additional future provinces. Dunford emphasized that they did not and would not deface the Union Jack with any emblem because to do so would be "sacriligious".
	1930	Maurice Brodeur's Proposal	A Canadian Red Ensign with a green maple leaf upon a simplified 'Old French'-style white shield replacing the Canadian Coat of Arms on the fly. The flag was endorsed by the Native Sons of Canada under the presidency of Oscar Boulanger. Brodeur was a designer with Quebec's Provincial Ministry of Roadways and would conceive the redesign of the Provincial Coat of arms of Quebec effected in 1939.
	1931	Gérard Gallienne's Proposal	A blue-red-blue vertical triband fimbriated by white bars (pallets) with the Canadian coat of arms placed in the centre. The blue bars symbolize the Atlantic and Pacific oceans and Canada's National Motto, A mari usque ad mare ('From sea to sea'), and the red Canada's land. Gallienne was a functionary with the Cartographic Service of Quebec's Provincial Ministry of Mines.
	1934	National Council of the Native Sons of Canada proposal	A horizontally divided field, blue over red, charged with a centered 9-pointed star surmounted by a green maple leaf. The nine points of the star represent Canada's then nine provinces.
	1934	Ramsay Traquair's Proposal	Banner of arms as national flag based on Canada's original 1921 Coat of Arms. Ramsay Traquair, a professor of architecture at McGill University, argued that the King had granted Canada a flag in granting it a coat of arms. Elements of the shield are reoriented to place the 'Canadian element' at the fly with the arms of England, Scotland, Ireland, and Royal France at the hoist and ordered as on the shield of Canada's arms.
	1935	Frank G. J. McDonagh's Proposal	A red maple leaf outlined in gold ('autumnal colors'), surmounted by a Tudor crown in natural colors, on a royal blue field. Endorsed in 1935 by the Native Sons of Canada. McDonagh was the national secretary-treasurer, and briefly nominal president, of the organization. The flag was meant to symbolize that Canada was now a sovereign dominion under the British monarch rather than a crown colony of the United Kingdom.
	1939	Ephrem Côté's Proposal	A blue-white-red diagonal triband (white bend sinister on a field party per bend sinister blue and red), with a Union Jack in upper hoist, green maple leaf centre, and white fleur-de-lis lower fly.
	1939	Jules Goulet's Proposal	A British Blue Ensign with Union Jack canton charged with golden beaver and Tudor crown, the golden fleurs-de-lis on fly. The Union Jack symbolizes English, Scottish, and Irish Canadians and the three fleurs-de-lis French Canadians. The beaver symbolizes Canada and the crown its loyalty to the British monarchy.
	c.1943	Ligue du Drapeau National's proposal	A red and white field divided diagaonally (per bend) defaced by a green maple leaf placed in the centre. Proposed by the Ligue du Drapeau National c. 1943. One of the two final designs considered by the 1945-1946 parliamentary joint committee to choose a national flag. Adopted and promoted by the Native Sons of Canada from 1946.
	1944	Eugène Achard's Proposal	On a blue field, a white symmetric cross surmounted by a red cross, charged by a green maple leaf ringed by nine white five-pointed stars.
	1944	C. C. Rathgeb's Proposal	Union Jack based flag with upper hoist white canton charged with nine red maple leaves. The nine maple leaves represent the provinces of Canada. Rathgeb's intention was to put Canada in the position of honor, reversing the relation on the Canadian Red Ensign. The resemblance to the Flag of the United States was intended to signal that Canada was a North American country.
	1945	Rev. Dan McIvor's Proposal	Field of nine red, white, and blue stripes charged with a green maple leaf surmounted by the Canadian Coat of Arms and Tudor crown on a white disc in the center. Displayed in the Commons by MP Rev. Dan McIvor, who would serve on the 1945-46 Joint Committee to choose a national flag for Canada. The stripes represent Canada's then nine provinces. They declared the design symbolized Canada's political autonomy. McIvor would only identify the designer as an "Ottawa manufacturer".
	1946	Charles Robitaille's proposal	Tricolor vertical triband of blue, gold, and green. One of the last twelve finalists in the 1945-46 Parliamentary committee process.
	1946	Archer Fortescue Duguid's final 1946 proposal	White field with three large red maple leaves conjoined on one stem and a small blue canton with silver and red Tudor crown in the upper hoist. Adapted from Duguid's 1925 design that had served as the flag of Canadian forces in Europe from 1939 to 1944. One of the final four selections of the 1945-46 Parliamentary Joint Committee.
	1946	J. Leroy Holman's proposal	White field with four blue bendlets sinister (scarps), surmounted by a Union Jack canton in the upper dexter corner and a red and white roundel with red maple leaf in the fly, all surrounded by a red border. The red border symbolized the Canadian Red Ensign and the binding of all the other symbols in a common heritage, the white field New France, and the four blue bendlets sinister Canada's four historic regions. Design inspired by Canadian World War I Victory Loan campaign flags that had featured a red border and five blue bendlets sinister in the upper dexter corner of the white field and unofficial national coat of arms in the fly. The design generated controversy when its bendlets sinister were denounced—erroneously—as heraldic marks of bastardy by Alan Beddoe. Holman's design was one of the final four selections of the 1945-46 Parliamentary Joint Committee.
	1946	Donald Nelson Baird's proposal	A red British ensign defaced with a golden maple leaf darkly outlined (fimbriated). Baird's design was one of some 25 golden maple leaf defaced Red Ensign proposals submitted to the committee but was the favorite of the design's advocate on the committee. In an effort to reach a compromise with Francophone committee members, the design was modified by outlining the leaf in white. Baird was not credited in the Parliamentary final report.
	1946	Parliamentary Joint Committee's final selection	A red British ensign defaced with a large golden maple leaf outlined (fimbriated) in white in the fly. Devised by a 1945-1946 Joint Committee of the Senate and House of Commons by adding the white outline to the golden maple leaf designs submitted by the public; but never submitted by the committee to Parliament for a vote.
	1946	D. F. Stedman's proposal	A blue field with red and white diagonal and vertical bars of varying breadth. Derived from the British Union Jack and French Tricolour and intended to represent British, French, and Native 'founding' peoples.
	1948	T. G. A. Henstridge's proposal	A field of ten blue and white stripes with Union Jack canton and red maple leaf charged with white fleur-de-lis. The ten blue and white stripes of the field represent Canada's provinces and identify Canada as a North American nation, the red maple leaf Canada, and the white fleur-de-lis the country's French heritage. The flag was endorsed by the Quebec and British Columbia commands of the Canadian Legion, the Lions Clubs of Canada, and some women's groups.
	1950	George J. McMurdo's proposal	White field with Union Jack canton and large red maple leaf surrounded by ring of ten smaller green maple leaves on fly. McMurdo's flag was endorsed by the No. 118 Branch (6th Hussars) of the Canadian Legion.
	1953	A. L. Caron's proposal	A royal blue field with white saltire with voided embossment (oval), charged with a maple leaf centered and a ring of red stars on the white of the oval of the voided embossment. The ten stars represent Canada's provinces and territories. Caron was the chairman of the board of Sheraton (Canadian) Hotels.
	1954	Florian A. Legace's proposal	A white cross on a red and blue quartered field, a green maple leaf centre. White "Cross of Sacrifice" after usage of Canadian Legion. Deep red of Union Jack, royal blue quarters intended to be intermediate between dark blue of the Union Jack and azure of the Fleurdelisé Flag of Quebec. Dubbed the 'Canadian Union Jack' by its creator, the points on the maple leaf symbolize its individual provinces and territories and its green colour Canada's natural resources and the evergreens found coast to coast.
	1954	John Lorne MacDougall's proposal	Red field with white side/flank in the hoist charged with a shield featuring the Union Jack of Great Britain and three golden fleurs-de-lis of royalist France/Quebec over which are three green maple leaves and a Tudor crown. One of several variants devised by an all-province study group of Liberal MPs convened by Bona Arsenault in 1954.
	1954	Jean-François Pouliot's Proposal	Green, detailed maple leaf on a plain red field.
	1955	Proposal of J.W. Bradfield of the Toronto Young Men's Canadian Club	Quartered banner featuring three golden lions on a field of red as the Arms of England in the first quarter (upper hoist), three white fleurs-de-lis on a field of blue recalling the Arms of Royal France and the Flag of Quebec in the third (lower fly), and in the second and fourth quarters (upper fly and lower hoist) three red maple leaves conjoined on a single stem on a white field as the 'Canadian element' of Canada's Coat of Arms, the foot (champagne) of its escutcheon.
	1955	Alan Beddoe's Proposal	A white field charged by three red maple leaves conjoined on one stem with narrow wavy vertical blue bars at hoist and fly.
	1955	André Barbeau's Proposal	A white square centre panel charged with a forest green maple leaf, flanked by blue, white, red vertical bars at hoist and fly.
	1957	Alfred Stagg's Proposal	Blue-white-blue vertical triband charged by a red maple leaf encircled by a red ring. The distinctive leaf appears to be a silver maple rather than the more standard sugar maple.
	1958	Jean Dubuc's Proposal	On a white field, a tripartite symmetric cross in red, white and blue, surmounted by a green maple leaf on a white disc. The white of the field symbolizes the First Nations and Inuit "still in possession of vast expanses of snow and ice of this country".
	1958	Vincent Dupuis's Proposal	Eleven red, white, and blue stripes with a white canton with green maple leaf. The stripes represent Canada's provinces and territories.
	1959	Leslie Frost's Proposal	A Canadian Red Ensign with the Dominion Coat of Arms wreathed by ten maple leaves, representing Canada's ten provinces. Designed by the Premier of Ontario.
	1959	Marcel Boivin's Proposal	Four bands of white, blue, gold, and red. Recreation based on textual description (orientation of bands not specified).
	1960	Graeme Consiglio's Proposal	A blue field with white offset cross enhanced and embossed, charged with a red ring and four vertical red stripes and six horizontal red stripes, a red maple leaf within the ring.
	1961	William A. Stepharnoff's Proposal	A field with four horizontal bands red, white, green and blue and a Union Jack canton. The Union Jack canton asserts Canada's membership in the British Commonwealth. The four bands represent regions of Canada: blue Lower Canada and the Atlantic provinces, green Upper Canada, white the Canadian Prairies, and red the Rocky Mountains and the West Coast.
	1961	Paul-Emile Marcoux's Proposal	A field of eleven stripes (six white, three blue, two red), voided by a large white disc charged by a large, dark green 21-point maple leaf. The striped field is intended to symbolize sovereignty, the individual provinces, the 'principal ethnic groups' (the British and French), and Canada as a united federation. Campaigners supporting the flag design hoisted it without authorization on Parliament Hill in the Canadian capital of Ottawa in the midst of the Great Flag Debate. The flag features prominently in the fore of a widely circulated photograph of the Parliamentary flag committee in the middle of its deliberations, surrounded by more than a thousand flag proposals.
	1962	Luc-André Biron's Proposal	A green Compass rose on a white background, symbolizing both the North Star and the North magnetic pole, situated within the territory of Canada, as emblem of all Canadians without regard to race, ethnicity, or national origin.
	1963	Archer Fortescue Duguid and John Ross Matheson's initial proposal	\ Three red maple leaves conjoined with a single stem on a white field, designed by Archer Fortescue Duguid. Initial proposal by PM Pearson's parliamentary secretary John Ross Matheson, made 14 February 1963. At one point, publicly supported by ex-PM and opposition leader John Diefenbaker during 1964 Great Flag Debate.
	1963	Rolland Lavoie's Proposal	A disc divided in half vertically, coloured red and blue, on a white field. First Prize winner in the 1963 joint Weekend/Perspectives and Canadian Art magazine national flag design contest.
	1963	James Sanders's Proposal	An abstractly stylized seven-point red maple leaf on a white field. Second Prize winner in the 1963 joint Weekend/Perspectives and Canadian Art magazine national flag design contest.
	1963	G. Reilly's proposal	Red field charged with two blue and ten white discs arranged four by three in the upper fly. Third Prize winner in the 1963 joint Weekend/Perspectives and Canadian Art magazine national flag design contest.
	1963	Gerhard Doerrié's proposal	A blue field with ten white five-pointed stars arranged horizontally at the upper edge (in chief). One of five Fourth Prize winners in the 1963 joint Weekend/Perspectives and Canadian Art magazine national flag design contest.
	1963	Leslie Coppold's proposal	A blue and white vertically divided field with an abstractly stylized fifteen-point red maple leaf on the square white fly panel. One of five Fourth Prize winners in the 1963 joint Weekend/Perspectives and Canadian Art magazine national flag design contest.
	1963	John McEachearn's proposal	A blue and white vertically divided field with an abstractly stylized fifteen-point red maple leaf on the square white fly panel. One of five Fourth Prize winners in the 1963 joint Weekend/Perspectives and Canadian Art magazine national flag design contest.
	1963	Carl Dair's proposal	On a red field, ten gold discs arranged in a ring, centered. Awarded Honorable Mention in the 1963 joint Weekend/Perspectives and Canadian Art magazine national flag design contest.
	1963	Frank Davies's proposal	Sky blue field with truncated white bar centered and affixed to fly. Awarded Honorable Mention in the 1963 joint Weekend/Perspectives and Canadian Art magazine national flag design contest.
	1963	Jacques de Tonnancour's proposal	Red and white field with blue disc at fly. Awarded Honorable Mention in the 1963 joint Weekend/Perspectives and Canadian Art magazine national flag design contest.
	1963	Jim Donoahue's proposal	A white field charged with ten evenly spaced vertical blue bars (pallets) at the hoist and a green maple leaf on the fly. Awarded Honorable Mention in the 1963 joint Weekend/Perspectives and Canadian Art magazine design contest.
	1963	W. D. Feist's proposal	Alternating green, white, gold vertical stripes (3, 5, 2 in number), the last white stripe narrower than the rest. Awarded Honorable Mention in the 1963 joint Weekend/Perspectives and Canadian Art magazine national flag design contest.
	1963	Allan Fleming's proposal	White field with two overlapping discs: hoistward yellow, flyward blue, section of overlap green. Awarded Honorable Mention in the 1963 joint Weekend/Perspectives and Canadian Art magazine national flag design contest.
	1963	Rolf Harder's proposal	A green and blue field horizontally divided (party per fess) charged with a stylized white maple leaf. Awarded Honorable Mention in the 1963 joint Weekend/Perspectives and Canadian Art magazine national flag design contest.
	1963	Grant Hewlett's proposal	A red field as square panel at fly with a white side or flank at hoist, charged with a green 19-point maple leaf. Awarded Honorable Mention in the 1963 joint Weekend/Perspectives and Canadian Art magazine national flag design contest.
	1963	Georges Huel's proposal	A white field, on the fly a green map leaf encircled by a ring of ten alternating red and blue discs. Awarded Honorable Mention in the 1963 joint Weekend/Perspectives and Canadian Art magazine national flag design contest.
	1963	Hans Kleefeld's proposal	White field with truncated blue bar, three stylized red maple leaves arrayed 90 degree angles at end of bar. Awarded Honorable Mention in the 1963 joint Weekend/Perspectives and Canadian Art magazine national flag design contest.
	1963	Frank Lipari's proposal	A white field with green maple leaf at the hoist and ten horizontal bars, five blue and five red, on the fly. Awarded Honorable Mention in the 1963 joint Weekend/Perspectives and Canadian Art magazine national flag design contest.
	1963	Anthony Mann's proposal	Red field with white symmetic cross and two square blue cantons at fly. Awarded Honorable Mention in the 1963 joint Weekend/Perspectives and Canadian Art magazine national flag design contest.
	1963	Morley Markson's proposal	White field with two blue squares at hoist and 10 evenly spaced semi-pallets extending to fly. Awarded Honorable Mention in the 1963 joint Weekend/Perspectives and Canadian Art magazine national flag design contest.
	1963	Guido Molinari's proposal	Blue field with two red vertical bars, one at hoist (side) and one near center (pale). Awarded Honorable Mention in the 1963 joint Weekend/Perspectives and Canadian Art magazine national flag design contest.
	1963	Ernst Roch's proposal	Blue field charged with a red maple leaf on a white oblong disc-shape. Awarded Honorable Mention in the 1963 joint Weekend/Perspectives and Canadian Art magazine national flag design contest.
	1963	Endel Ruberg's proposal	A horizontal triband of white, green, and gold. Awarded Honorable Mention in the 1963 joint Weekend/Perspectives and Canadian Art magazine national flag design contest.
	1963	Victor Tolgesy's proposal	Broad white center panel flanked by blue vertical bars at hoist and fly and charged with twelve blue triangles arranged in four rows of three. Awarded Honorable Mention in the 1963 joint Weekend/Perspectives and Canadian Art magazine national flag design contest.
	1963	Kazuo Nakamura's proposal	On a red broad fess with blue and white bars in chief and base, a white maple leaf on a blue disc. Illustration featured in the September/October 1963 Canadian Art magazine article on their joint national flag design contest with Weekend/Perspectives magazine.
	1963	Forrest C. Nickerson's Proposal	Flag consists of a red background with a white half-circle at each of its left and right extremities. Each white half-circle contains a blue disc.
	1964	D. F. Stedman's second proposal	A red field charged with superimposed blue and white geometric concave kites ('interlocking boomerang shapes') and two small white discs at the fly. Each partition of the field effected by the design was intended to represent one of Canada's then ten provinces and two territories.
	1964	Prime Minister Lester B. Pearson's proposal, conceived by Alan Beddoe	A white field flanked by two light azure blue vertical bars, charged with an emblem of three red maple leaves on a single stem. The flag's trileaf is taken from the emblem of Canada on the national Canadian Coat of Arms while the bars on either end represent Canada's National Motto A mari usque ad mare ('From sea to sea'). Proposal made at the outset of the Great Flag Debate, favored by Prime Minister Lester B. Pearson and popularly known as the Pearson Pennant. Beddoe first submitted a proposed flag of similar design in 1955. The original mid-1964 draft version featured spikey, rounded heraldic maple leaves.
	1964	George Matthias Bist's proposal	A critique and redesign of the Pearson Pennant, offered during the Great Flag Debate. Features a red stylized 9-point maple leaf (black maple) on a white square pale, with an 'air force blue' field, or bars on either side. Design credited by John Matheson with inventing the Canadian pale. The NDP favored a single leaf and their design proposal was inspired by Bist's.
	1964	Reid Scott of the New Democratic Party's proposal	A white field charged with a single red maple leaf and flanked by two vertical blue bars. The NDP favored George Matthias Bist's proposed design but their manufactured prototypes did not embody Bist's signature proportions or simplified leaf.
	1964	John Ross Matheson's revision of Alan Beddoe's design	A white field flanked by two wide, dark blue vertical bars, charged with an emblem of three red maple leaves on a single stem. The flag's proportions were lengthened to 1:2 (from 3:5), the blue bars widened to occupy 1/4th the width of the flag (previously 1/5th), and the colors darkened to more closely resemble the Flag of the United Kingdom. This version was the Parliamentary flag committee's "Group A" Finalist.
	1964	Proposal made during the Great Flag Debate featuring four maple leaves	Four large maple leaves occupy the centre of the flag. Behind them is a white diamond on a blue background. The leaves are arranged similarly to the modern heraldic mark of the Prime Minister, and their stems form the Cross of Saint George in the middle.
	1964	Proposal made during the Great Flag Debate featuring one maple leaf	The background is like the British flag without the diagonal stripes, there is a green maple leaf in the centre and there are three stars on either side in the red stripe and two stars on either side in the vertical red stripe.
	1964	Proposal made during the Great Flag Debate featuring ten maple leaves	Ten maple leaves are spread across the flag, and they likely represent the provinces. On the left are red leaves on a red background. The right side features the same colours inverted.
	1964	Proposal for Flag of Canada, by George F. G. Stanley	A red-white-red vertical triband, a red field with a white pale, containing a single red 15-point maple leaf. Based on the flag of the Royal Military College of Canada, where Stanley served as Dean of Arts. One of two designs Stanley suggested to John Matheson during the Great Flag Debate.
	1964	George F. G. Stanley's alternate proposal	A red-white-red horizontal triband, a red field with a white fess, containing a three-leaf maple branch. His second option suggested to John Matheson.
	1964	A. Y. Jackson's proposal	A white field with two wavy horizontal bars affixed to the top and bottom (in chief and base), in the center an emblem of three maple leaves on one stem. The wavy bars are intended to represent the rivers 'by which Canada was explored and opened up'. Prominent artist A. Y. Jackson presented the design as critique and alternative to Alan Beddoe's design (the 'Pearson Pennant') then favored by the Prime Minister.
	1964	Proposal made during the Great Flag Debate featuring one maple leaf. "Group C" finalist considered by Parliamentary committee.	Identical to "Group B" final choice of 1964 Committee but with Union Flag and royal French banner with three fleurs-de-lis as cantonal charges in upper hoist and fly. Introduced ostensibly to placate supporters of Canadian Red Ensign, eliminated in second to last round of voting.
	1964	Proposal made during Great Flag Debate, Parliamentary Committee "Group B" finalist and Committee final selection.	Final choice of 1964 Parliamentary Joint Committee. Features vertical triband, red-white-red colour scheme, and single maple leaf proposed by George Stanley, George Matthias Bist's broad pale, and 13-point maple leaf designed by Alan Beddoe.
	1964	An intermediate manufactured prototype of the 1964 Parliamentary flag committee's final selection.	An intermediate redesign of the Parliamentary Joint Committee's final selection, featuring a variant 13-point maple leaf. Appears in press images taken in the month of December 1964, including a press agency photograph at the closure of Parliamentary debate and a magazine cover depicting the new flag flying on Parliament Hill.
	1994	Proposed flag for Canada, known as the Canadian Unity Flag	Blue vertical stripes replacing part of the red bands, in approximate proportion to population of French heritage.
	1996	The Unilisé, a flag used by Canadian federalists in Quebec	A banner combining the flags of Canada and Quebec. Made in 1996 after the Quebec independence referendum by federalists who supported remaining with Canada to represent national unity.
