= Chisholm Lumber =

Canadian lumbar company

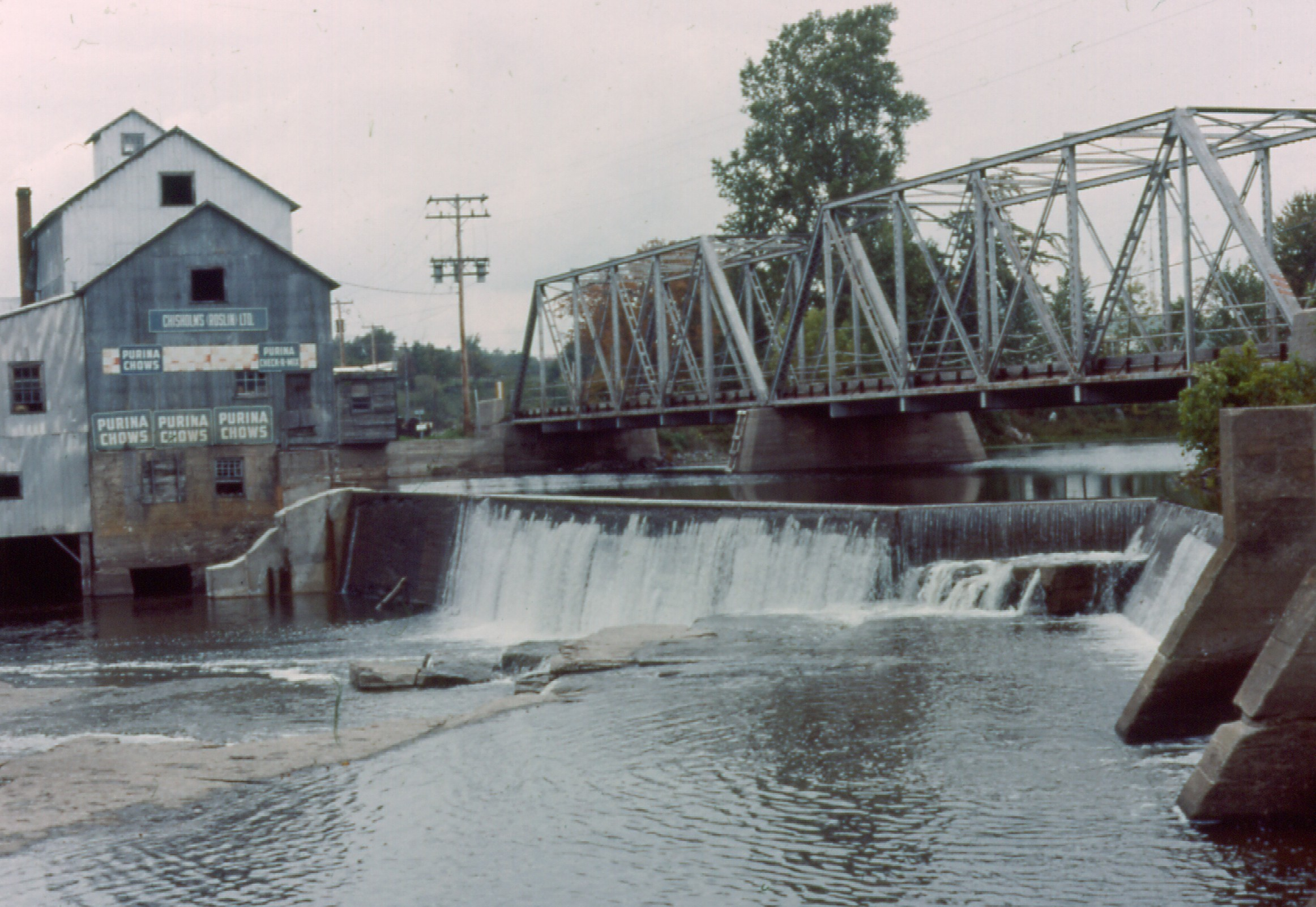
- Chisholm Mill, 1973
- Industry: Lumber
- Founded: 1857
- Founder: William Fraser Chisholm
- Headquarters: Roslin, Ontario, Canada
- Production output: 5,000,000 board feet (2007)

Chisholm Lumber is a lumber company located in Roslin, Ontario, Canada. It has operated the Chisholm's Mill since 1857, has five subsidiaries, and employs 40 staff along with dozens of contractors.

It has been operated by six generations of the Chisholm family.

== History and ownership ==
Chisholm Lumber was founded in 1857 when William Fraser Chisholm purchased the Shipman’s Flour and Sawmill, on the banks of the Moira River. Since 1857, the mill has been known as Chisholm's Mill.

The fifth generation of the Chisholm family, Doug Chisholm and his cousin Paul Chisholm bought the company from their fathers in 1981 and ran it until 2010. Peter Chisholm (President) and Jordan Chisholm represent the sixth generation currently running the operation.

Marking its 150th anniversary in 2007, the company donated a 1.5 acre plot of land and $20,000 of lumber to Habitat for Humanity.

A fire destroyed the Chisholm's Mill in 1944 and a 2004 fire, which destroyed the kilns. Replacement kilns were installed in 2005.

== Assets and activities ==
The company is located on a 25-acre ranch; assets include two sawmills, two Nardi dry kilns (in Tweed), and a planing mill. The 100,000 BF kilns are heated by a 10 foot by 6 feet by 5 feet bioenergy burner fuelled by sawdust & shavings byproduct from the mills.

In 2007, the company employed more than 30 employees, and as of 2018 it employed 40. As of 2018, the company has five subsidiaries, including a sawmill, a retail lumber yard, a forest management company, a residential design-and-build company, and a wholesale hardwood kiln dried division (kilns located in Tweed, Ontario). It opened the custom home building division in 2007.

As of 2007, the company produced five million board feet of wood; approximately 80% hardwood and 20% pine. The hardwood is sold worldwide and the pine is generally re-manufactured in their planing mill and sold through the Chisholm Lumber retail store in Roslin, Ontario.
