= Tony Mann =

Tony or Anthony Mann may refer to:

- Tony Mann (cricketer) (1945–2019), Australian cricketer
- Tony Mann, physicist from Western Australia, see TV and FM DX
- Anthony Mann (1906–1967), American actor and film director
- Sir Anthony Mann (judge) (born 1951), English High Court judge
- Anthony Mann (designer) (1927–2013), British-Canadian designer and educator
