= Melrose, Ontario =

Melrose, Ontario may refer to:

- Melrose, Hastings County, Ontario
- Melrose, Middlesex County, Ontario
