= Chisholm's Mills =

Canadian lumber mill, built 1851

Coordinates: 44.3531°N 77.3080°W

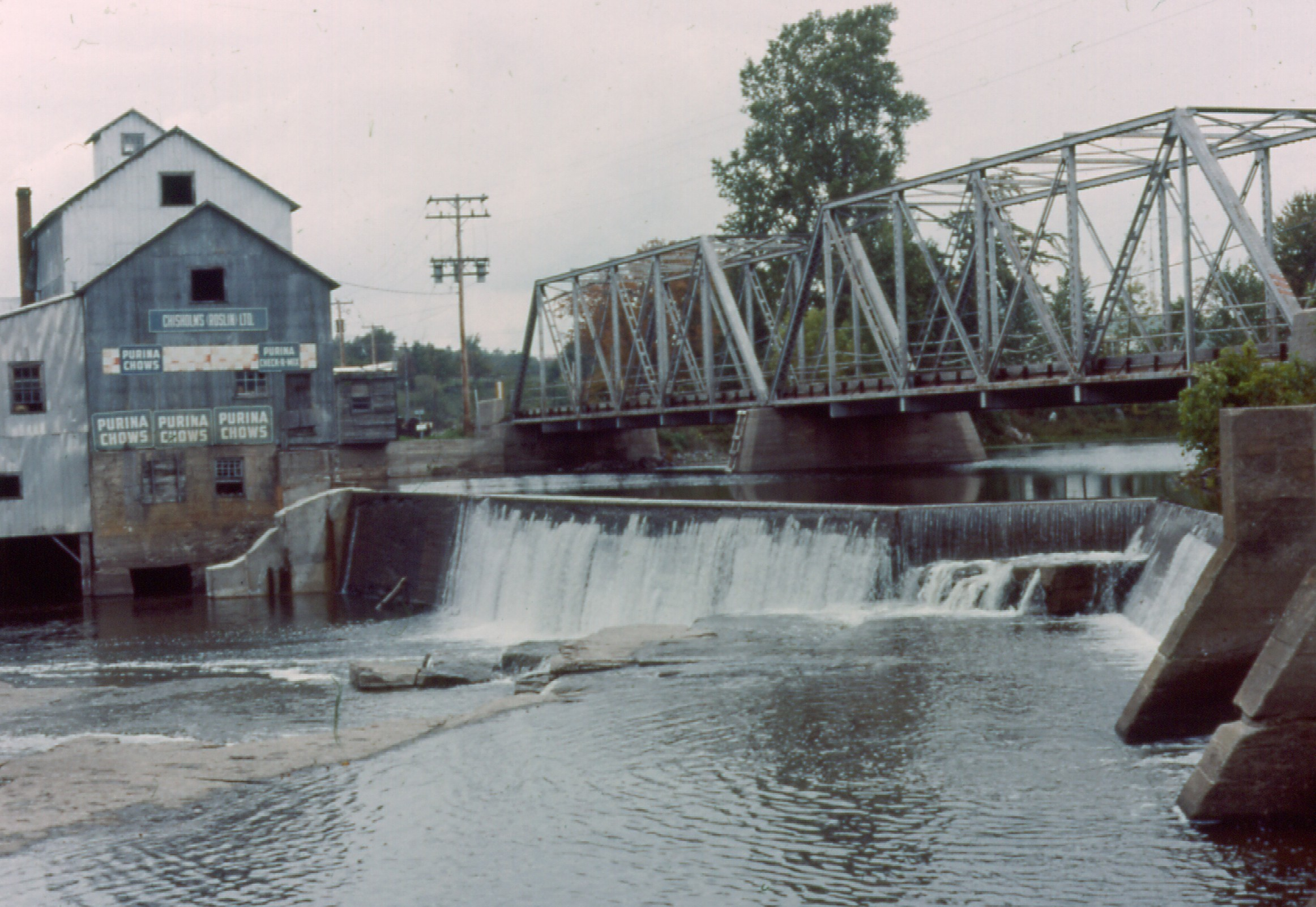
The mill in 1973

Chisholm's Mills (previously Shipman's Mill) is a water-powered lumber mill on the Moira River in Tyendinaga township, Ontario, Canada. It was constructed in 1851 and bought by William Fraser Chisholm in 1857, leading to the creation of the Chisholm Lumbar company.

The mill was painted by Manly E. MacDonald's around 1949, and commemorated with a historical plaque in 2018.

== Location ==
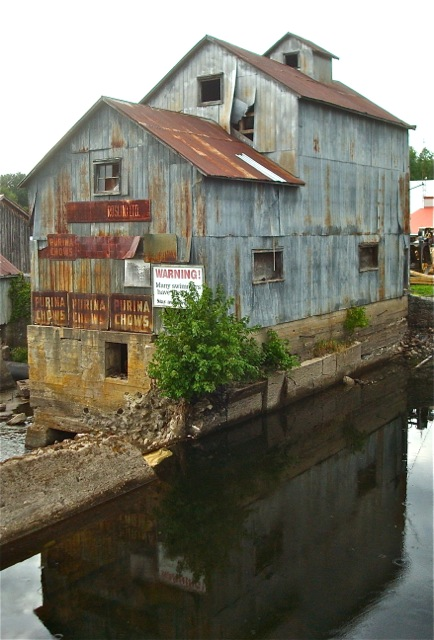
Mill building

The mill is located on the Moira River next to Shannonville Road, near the unincorporated community of Roslin, in Tyendinaga township, Ontario, Canada.

== History ==
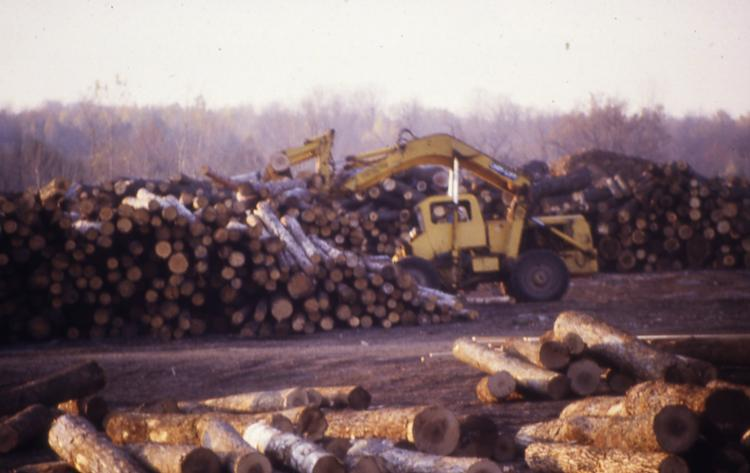
Moving logs at the mill, 1985

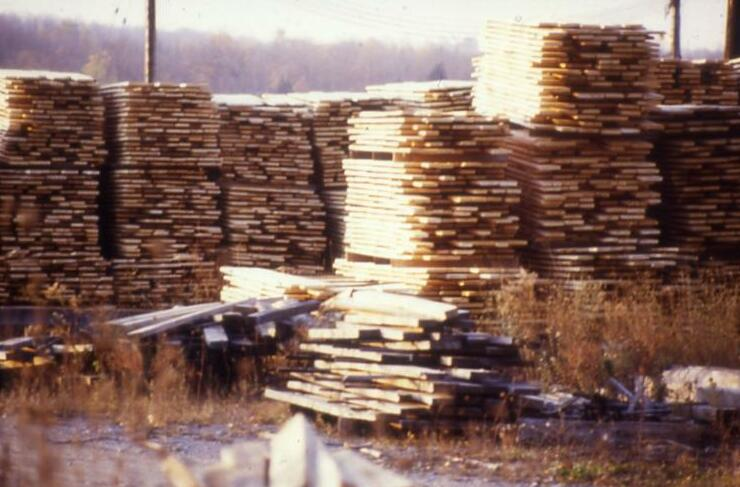
Lumber from the Mill, 1985

The mill was built in 1851. William Fraser Chisholm (1829-1908) bought the mill in 1857 when it was known as Shipman's Mill, or Shipman’s Flour and Sawmill. At that time the property was a water-powered flour mill, a feed mill, and a sawmill. Until the early 1900s, mill operators would float harvested lumber down the Moira River from the point of harvesting, southwards towards the mill.

A fire destroyed the building in 1944, and it was rebuilt.

As of 2018, six generations of the Chisholm family have operated the mill as part of the Chisholm Lumber operations. In 2018, Hastings County Historical Society unveiled a brass plaque commemorating the mill.

== In popular culture ==
Manly E. MacDonald's circa 1949 painting of the mill is housed in the National Gallery of Canada. It has also been painted by Lucy Manly, James Keirstead, Debra Tate-Sears (watercolour, 1986) and Edna Henderson.
