= Gerhard Doerrié =

- Born: January 25, 1936; Celle, Germany
- Died: February 1984 (aged 48); Berlin, Germany
- Occupations: Graphic Designer, Educator
- Spouse: Waltraud Margraf

Gerhard Doerrié RCA (25 January 1936 – February 1984) was a German-Canadian graphic designer and educator. One of a cohort of foreign-born designers who bought the modernist approach of the International Style to Canada. Doerrié was an accomplished book designer. Positions held included Design Director of Paul Arthur+Associates, Ottawa, instructor at the Ontario College of Art, and head of the Department of Visual Communication at the Nova Scotia College of Art and Design (NSCAD).

== Family ==
Born 25 January 1936 in Celle, Germany, Doerrié was raised by his Russian-German grandmother. He married the artist and designer Waltraud Margraf, whom he met in Berlin while both worked as designers. She emigrated with him to Canada in 1961.

== Education ==
Doerrié studied graphic design at the Werkkunstchule Hannover, graduating with honors. He continued his studies in Paris on a Walter Gropius Foundation Scholarship.

== Work ==
Doerrié emigrated to Canada in 1961 to participate in the redesign of the visual identity system of the Canadian National Railway (CNR) with the firm of James Valkus Inc. Montréal/New York. Doerrié was recruited on the recommendation of Ernst Roch, then also at the firm. Doerrié would go on to become an instructor at the Ontario College of Art, where he would play an important role in diffusing the International Typographic Style. From 1964 to 1966, he was Design Director at Paul Arthur+Associates (PA+A) in Ottawa. While at PA+A, Doerrié designed the final annual catalogue of the Society of Typographic Designers of Canada, Typography 64, and participated in the effort to select a logo for the 1967 Canadian Centennial celebration. Doerrié then relocated to New York to work at the studio of Massimo Vignelli, but left after less than a year. From 1971 to 1974, he headed the Department of Visual Communication of the Nova Scotia College of Art and Design (NSCAD).

== Later life ==
Doerrié died in Berlin in February of 1984.

== Design philosophy ==
"The central concern for Doerrié was problem solving, a positivist belief that the proper framing of the question would yield a single answer - the conviction that communication had an essence. He became disillusioned by the application of this approach, however, as it became more widely used." - Brian Donnelly

"Doerrié valued dramatic exploration of the formal, 'concrete' aspects of type and form." - Brian Donnelly

== Notable designs ==
Doerrié's Fourth Prize winning entry in the 1963 Canadian Art and Weekend/Perspectives national flag design contest.

- Final issue of the annual catalogue of the Society of Typographic Designers of Canada (TDC), Typography 64
- Canada: The Uneasy Neighbor by Gerald Clark (1965)
- On the Enjoyment of Modern Art by Jerrold Morris (1965)
- Painting in Canada by J. Russell Harper (1966)
- Signage system for Carleton University in Ottawa

== Awards, honors, and recognition ==
- Royal Canadian Academy of Arts, Fellow (1973)
- Design Professionals of Canada (DesCan), Fellow (1975)
- Experimental work included in the permanent collection of the Museum of Modern Art, New York.
- Award for experimental typography, Typography 64 (1964)
- Awarded Fourth Prize in the joint Canadian Art and Weekend/Perspectives magazine contest to design a national flag for Canada (1963)
