= Jim Donoahue =

Canadian graphic designer

James Thomas Donoahue
- Born: October 15, 1934; Walkerton, Ontario, Canada
- Died: February 12, 2022 (aged 87); Toronto, Ontario, Canada
- Citizenship: Canadian
- Education: Ontario College of Art
- Occupation: Graphic Designer
- Children: Zoe, Noah, Colin, and Ashlynne (stepdaughter)
- Parent(s): Nancy and Frank Donoahue

James Thomas Donoahue RCA (15 October 1934 – 2 February 2022) was a Canadian graphic designer renowned for designing the official wordmark of the Government of Canada. Donoahue was mentored by Allan Fleming. Donoahue specialized in the design of corporate logos, emblems, and trademarks, including that of The Sports Network (TSN).

== Chronology ==
Born in Walkerton, Ontario in 1932, Donoahue enrolled in the Ontario College of Art in 1952. While there, they met their mentor Allan Fleming. After graduation, they worked at the National Film Board of Canada, Montréal from 1957 to 1959. Feeling stymied professionally, Donoahue returned to Toronto to work as an assistant to Allan Fleming at the typehouse Cooper and Beatty, Ltd. (1959–1961). Thereafter Donoahue worked at TDF Artists, Toronto (1961–1963); Goodis, Goldberg, Soren, Toronto (1963–1965); Reeson, Dimson & Smith, Toronto (1965–1967); and MacLaren Advertising, Toronto (1967–1969). When Fleming left Cooper & Beatty to join MacLaren, Donoahue in turn left MacLaren to replace Fleming as creative director at Cooper & Beatty, Toronto (1969–1974). Then, they worked at Goodtypes, Toronto (1974–1975) and joined Burns Cooper Donoahue Fleming, Toronto (1975–1977). Finally, they left that partnership to form their own firm, Jim Donoahue and Associates (Donoahue Design), where they worked from 1977 until their demise in 2022.

== Design Philosophy ==
Jim Donoahue states, “The big mistake people make is that they often respond to a trend, and the logo ends up being a trendy logo. It has a look that says it’s 1988, and the risk there, of course, is that in 1990 the thing looks dated. I love the idea of a logo being good enough that you can get 25 years of service out of it.”

“The problem with a lot of logos;’ says Jim Donoahue, 'is that people try to put too much into them. A guy’ll end up with three initials and his mother's picture in the thing. I mean, you just can't do that. It doesn't communicate. The best logos are the ones that communicate the quickest to you.”

"Jim was never an ideological modernist like many of his contemporaries; he saw modernism as just one of the tools at his disposal."

== Notable logos ==
Canada wordmark

The Sports Network (TSN) logo, original
