= Federal Identity Program =

Program of the Government of Canada

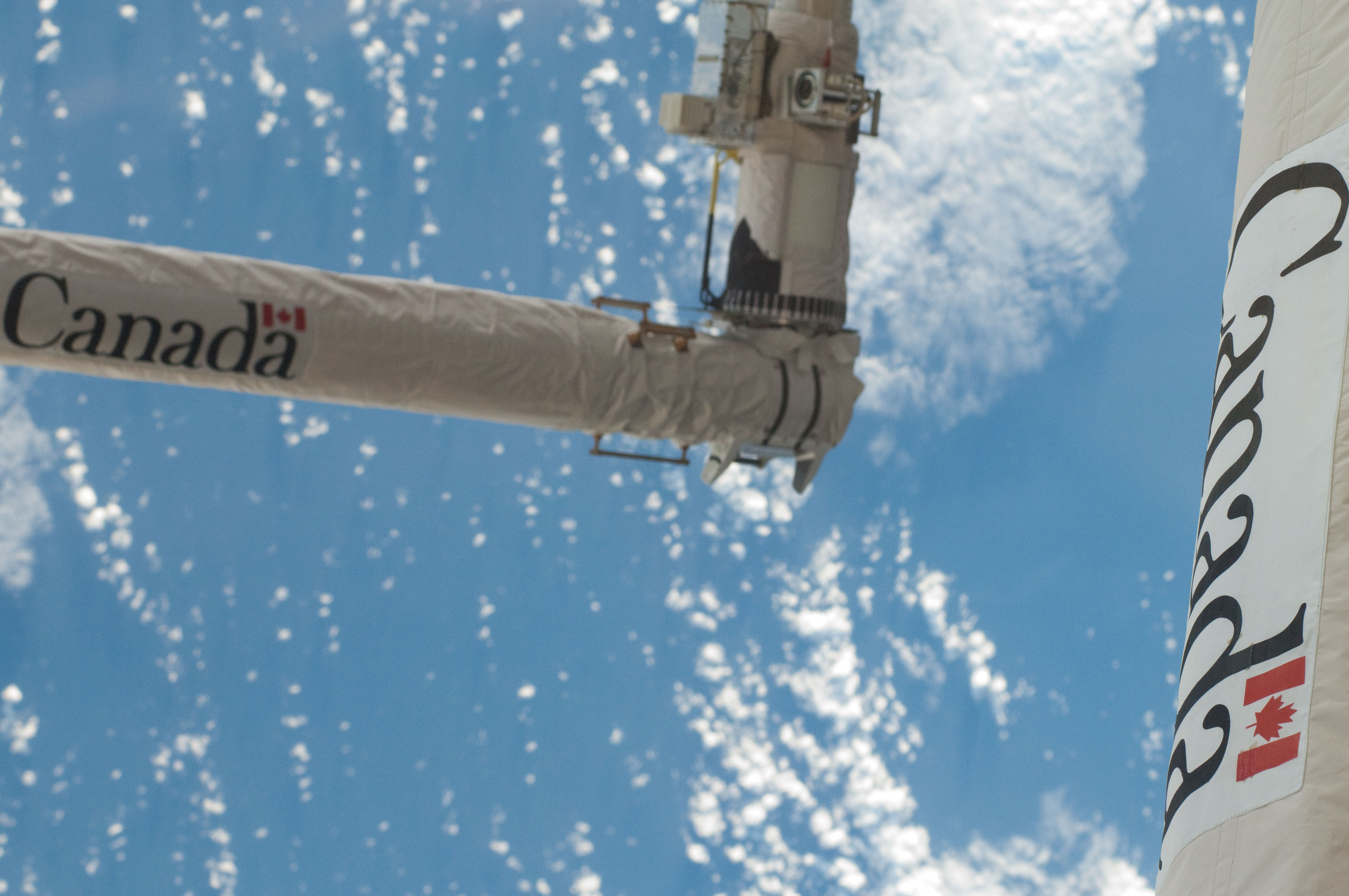
The Canada wordmark on the Canadarm2, part of the Mobile Servicing System on the International Space Station

The Federal Identity Program (FIP; French: Programme de coordination de l'image de marque; PCIM) is the Government of Canada's corporate branding identity program. The purpose of the FIP is to provide to the public a consistent and unified image for federal government projects and activities. Other objectives of the program include facilitating public access to federal programs and services, promoting the equal status of the two official languages, and achieving better management of the federal identity. Managed by the Treasury Board Secretariat, this program, and the government's communication policy, help to shape the public image of the government. In general, logos – or, in the parlance of the policy, visual identifiers – used by government departments other than those specified in the FIP must be approved by the Treasury Board.

== Background ==
The origin of the Federal Identity Program can be traced back to 1921 when King George V proclaimed the Royal Coat of Arms, making red and white the official colours of Canada. In 1965, Queen Elizabeth II proclaimed the Canadian flag, and the maple leaf became an official symbol of Canada.

In 1969, the Official Languages Act was established to ensure the equality of English and French in all federal jurisdictions. That same year, the Task Force on Government Information found that the Canadian government was conveying a confused image to the populace through a hodge-podge of symbology and typefaces (fonts). In 1970, the FIP was created to standardize a corporate identity for the Canadian government.

== Applications ==
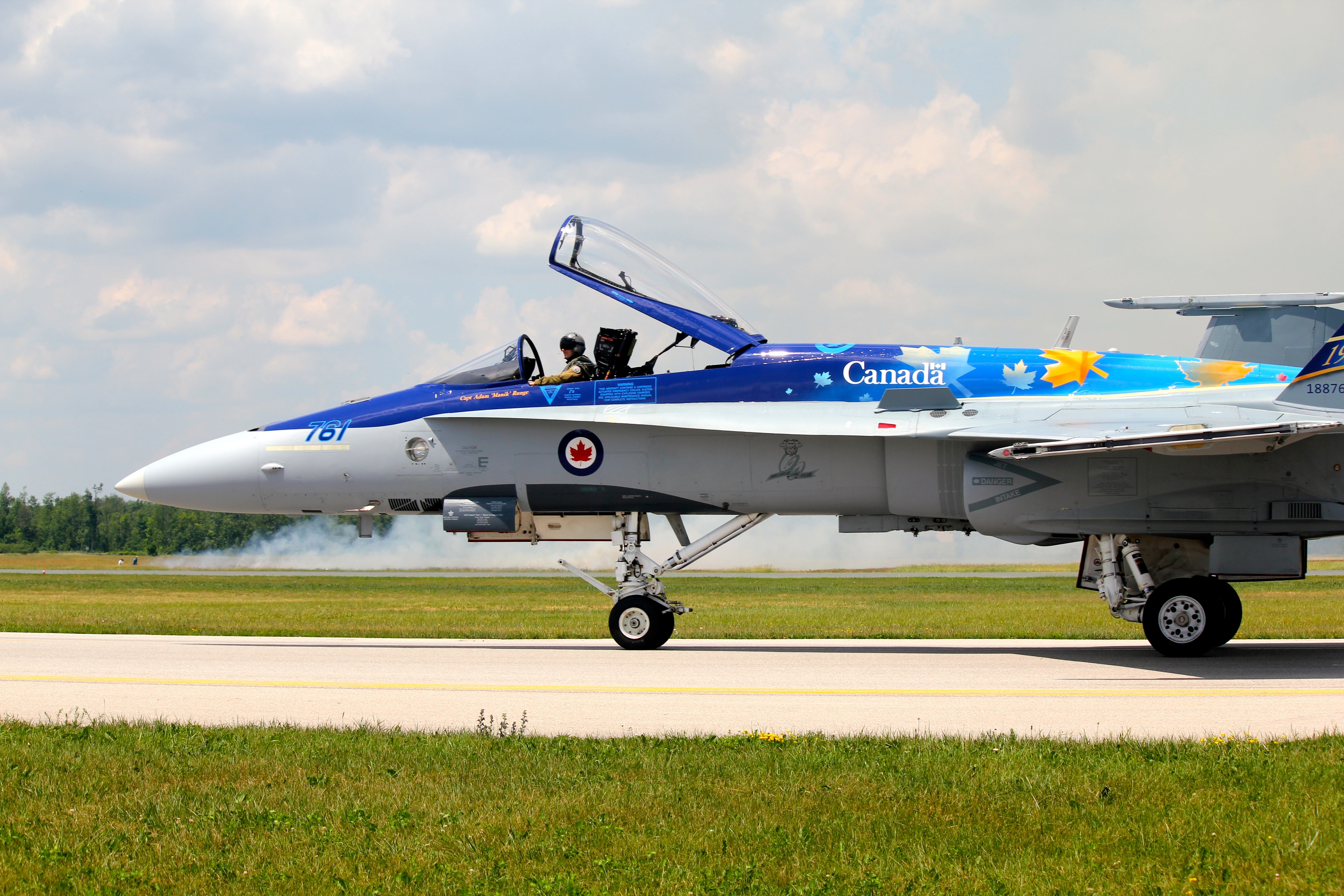
An RCAF CF-188 with the Canada wordmark

The Federal Identity Program covers approximately 160 institutions and over 20,000 facilities across Canada and worldwide. Individual departments or agencies can manage their own corporate identity and decide the fields of application based on their mandate and operating needs. The corporate identity can be used either externally in communication with the public, or internally with government employees. Among the applications are stationery, forms, vehicular markings, signage, advertising, published material, electronic communications, audio-visual productions, candy, expositions, personnel identification, awards, plaques, packaging, buildings, labelling, and identification of equipment.

== Components ==
There are two basic components of the Federal Identity Program: the Canada wordmark and the corporate signature with one of the two national symbols and a bilingual title, all of which are rendered consistently.

Official and signage colours, including the national colours of Canada, are specified in the design standard as RGB values, CMYK colors, and Pantone Color Matching System numbers.

=== Canada wordmark ===

The Canada wordmark is mandatory on virtually all of the applications mentioned above. The Canada wordmark was first designed by Jim Donahue in 1965 and established in 1972 as the logo for the government of Canada. It consists of the word "Canada" written in a modified version of Baskerville with a Canadian flag over the final 'a'. In a 1999 study commissioned by the federal government, 77% of respondents remembered seeing the Canada wordmark at some point in the past. Television viewers may be familiar with the logo from seeing it in the credits of Canadian television programs, where it is used to indicate government funding or tax credits.

=== Corporate signatures ===
There exist two basic types of FIP corporate signatures, each having a bilingual title and one of two official symbols. The title, referred to as an applied title, is used in all communications with the public. Creating or changing an applied title must be approved by the department minister and the President of the Treasury Board. The title is rendered in one of three typefaces of the sans serif Helvetica family, selected for its simplicity and modernity.

- One signature variant, with the national flag, is used to identify all departments, agencies, corporations, commissions, boards, councils, and any other federal body and activity. In such signatures, the flag typically appears to the left of a bilingual title (see first image above). When the FIP was first implemented, a similar signature without the band on the flag's 'fly' (right) was used until 1987 (see second image above).
- The other variant (such as those used by the Offices of the Prime Minister and Auditor General), with the coat of arms, is used to identify ministers and their offices, parliamentary secretaries, institutions whose heads report directly to Parliament, and institutions with quasi-judicial functions. When applied within the context of the FIP, the coat of arms is often flanked on each side by an official's or department's bilingual title. Use of the coat of arms, instead of the flag signature, requires authorization by the appropriate minister with agreement of the President of the Treasury Board.

=== Use of other symbols ===
Other symbols can be used together with the FIP symbols, except on standard applications such as stationery, signage and vehicle markings.

== Exemptions ==
Certain federal entities were listed as exempt from FIP in the 1990 FIP Policy:

- Atlantic Canada Opportunities Agency
- Atomic Energy of Canada Limited
- Bank of Canada
- Canada Border Services Agency
- Canada Council
- Canada Development Investment Corporation
- Canada Labour Relations Board
- Canada Lands Company Limited
- Canada Lands Company (Le Vieux-Port de Montréal) Limited
- Canada Lands Company (Vieux-Port de Québec) Inc.
- Canada Lands Company (Mirabel) Limited
- Canada Mortgage and Housing Corporation
- Canada Ports Corporation
- Canada Post Corporation
- Canadian Armed Forces
- Canadian Broadcasting Corporation
- Canadian Centre for Management Development
- Canadian Centre for Occupational Health and Safety
- Canadian Commercial Corporation
- Canadian General Standards Board
- Canadian Human Rights Commission
- Canadian Intergovernmental Conference Secretariat
- Canadian National Railway Company (privatized in 1995)
- Canadian Patents and Development Limited
- Canadian Saltfish Corporation
- Canadian Wheat Board (privatized in 2015)
- CORCAN (industrial work program of Correctional Service Canada)
- Economic Council of Canada
- Enterprise Cape Breton Corporation
- Export Development Corporation
- Federal Business Development Bank
- Freshwater Fish Marketing Corporation
- Halifax Port Corporation
- Harbourfront Corporation
- House of Commons
- International Centre for Ocean Development
- Judicial branch
- Language Training Canada (component of the Public Service Commission of Canada)
- Marine Atlantic Inc.
- Montreal Port Corporation
- National Arts Centre Corporation
- National Capital Commission
- National Film Board
- National Round Table on the Environment and the Economy
- Office of the Secretary to the Governor General of Canada
- Petro-Canada (privatized in 1991)
- Port Metro Vancouver
- Port of Quebec Corporation
- Prince Rupert Port Corporation
- Public Service Staff Relations Board
- Royal Canadian Mint
- Royal Canadian Mounted Police
- Saint John Port Corporation
- Science Council of Canada
- Senate of Canada
- Standards Council of Canada
- St. John's Port Corporation
- St. Lawrence Seaway Authority
- Via Rail Canada Inc. (Note: Via Rail would later incorporate the Canada wordmark in its logo.)
