= Peter H. Martyn =

Canadian journalist and author (born 1948)

- Born: 1948 (age 77–78) Toronto, Canada
- Occupation: Journalist, author
- Education: Oberlin College (BA); Carleton University
- Children: 2

Peter H. Martyn (born 1948, in Toronto, Canada) is a career journalist and author. He worked at the Toronto Sun (1981–86) and Toronto Star (198-2007) and at smaller newspapers beginning in 1969. He has two children and is married to a lawyer in Toronto. From 1973 to 1977, he and Maria K. de Martyn drove from Toronto to the Northwest Territories and from there to the Beagle Channel in Tierra del Fuego and back to Toronto.

== Education ==
- University: Oberlin College, Ohio (B.A. - Chemistry)
- Post-Grad: Carleton University (Master of Journalism)

== News career ==
In fall 1967, Martyn took a photo that changed his career aspirations from chemical research to journalism. Published on the front page of the Oberlin News-Tribune, it depicted one of the early anti-Vietnam War protests at an eastern college, and was mentioned in the Senate by the then junior Senator from Tennessee, Al Gore. The photo ran in many publications and countries (allegedly in North Vietnam) and was reprinted in Edward P. Morgan’s The 60s Experience.

Martyn’s first photo assignment for the local paper was a photo of Oberlin High School students on April 4, 1968. In the summer of 1969, he was employed by the News-Tribune as a staff photographer, and became a writer when the paper’s full-time reporter broke her wrist. The same summer, Martyn created the images used in Composition, Reaction, and Equilibrium — the first photographically illustrated laboratory manual for undergraduate chemistry students.

After returning to Canada in fall 1969, Martyn worked at freelance photography and eventually joined the staff of Gilbert A. Milne Ltd. In Toronto. In 1972 he wrote and took photos for two cover stories in the national rotogravure newsmagazine, Weekend.

After returning from travels in North, Central and South America, in 1979 Martyn became Editor of the Tottenham News, in a small town north of Toronto. He became Managing Editor of the twice weekly Orangeville Banner, owned by Thompson Newspapers, in 1980. In 1981, he moved to the Toronto Sun, then an independent daily tabloid, where he worked on the “rim” — the news copy-editing desk. In 1986 he was hired by Canada’s largest newspaper, the Toronto Star, where he rotated through various editing positions to become Deputy Foreign Editor for nine years (1998-2007), through the turbulent election of George W. Bush, the 9/11 attacks, the Afghanistan War, the invasion of Iraq, until 2007.

He also worked as a copy editor at the Canadian Broadcasting Corporation’s online news site, cbcnews.ca, and at the daily Metro Toronto newspaper.

== Academic career ==
In 2007, Martyn co-taught (with former Star managing editor Mary Deanne Shears) a course called Protocols of the Canadian Media, part of the Canadian Journalism for Internationally-Trained Writers program at Sheridan College near Toronto. He left the Toronto Star to take a Masters in Journalism at Carleton University in Ottawa, graduating in Fall 2008 with a thesis titled Get Your ‘Mojos’ Working: How the Techniques and Technologies of Mobile Multimedia Reporting Affect the Practice of Journalism. In the 2007-08 academic year, he was a Teaching Assistant for the Business section of Centretown News, a 17,000-circulation community newspaper put out by fourth-year students at Carleton University.

He taught at Humber College and the University of Guelph-Humber in Toronto from 2007 to 2015, teaching courses in multimedia journalism (university, fourth year), magazine writing & editing (university, third year), news reporting & copy editing (post-grad diploma), online journalism (post-grad diploma), news writing & editing: Et Cetera reporters (post-grad diploma), journalism print group: Et Cetera production (diploma, third year), news writing & editing: Et Cetera student reporters (second year), newspaper editing & writing (university, second year), media writing (university, first year), internet survey & research (university, first year), introduction to online journalism (advanced diploma, first year), news reporting (advanced diploma, first year), beat reporting (advanced diploma, first year) and fundamentals of reporting (advanced diploma, first year).

== Academic publications & presentations ==
Martyn, Peter H. (2009). "The Mojo in the Third Millennium: Is multimedia journalism affecting the news we see?" Journalism Practice. [“among the most downloaded JP articles in 2009”]

Martyn, Peter H. (2008). "Lynch Mob: Pack journalism and how the Jessica Lynch story became propaganda." Canadian Journal of Media Studies.

Martyn, Peter H. (2009) "Mojos, Platypuses and Newswork: Multimedia reporters in the eye of an economic and technological storm." (Invited presentation, Future of Journalism Conference, Cardiff University, Wales.

== Awards ==
• 2007-2008: Robert and Alyce Martin Scholarship in Journalism, Carleton University

• 2007-2008: Joe O’Donnell Graduate Scholarship in Journalism, Carleton University

• 2007-2008: Departmental Scholarship, School of Journalism and Communication, Carleton University
