= The Canadian (newspaper supplement) =

Canadian newspaper supplement

- Categories: Newspaper supplement
- Frequency: Weekly
- Publisher: Southam Press
- Founded: 1965
- Final issue: 1979
- Country: Canada
- Language: English

The Canadian was a Canadian weekly newspaper supplement published by Southam Press from 1965 to 1979. Distributed through Southam newspapers across Canada, it was established to compete with the rival supplement Weekend, which was published by FP Publications. In 1979, the two magazines merged to form Canadian Weekend, which was renamed Today in 1980 before ceasing publication in 1982.

== History ==
Southam introduced The Canadian in 1965 after ending distribution of Weekend in its newspapers. The new supplement competed directly with Weekend for readers, writers and national advertising.

The magazine was published as a weekend supplement in Southam newspapers across Canada. It featured general-interest journalism and was intended as a national publication comparable to Weekend.

In 1965, Southam and the Toronto Star formed Southstar Publishers. As part of the arrangement, the companies produced a joint newsstand edition entitled The Canadian/Star Weekly, while Star Weekly continued to appear with the Toronto Star.

Southam acquired full ownership of Star Weekly in 1968. The publication was merged with The Canadian under the title The Canadian/Star Weekly. Following the closure of Star Weekly at the end of 1973, The Canadian became the weekend magazine distributed with the Toronto Star as well as Southam newspapers.

Facing declining circulation and advertising revenues, The Canadian and Weekend merged in 1979 to form Canadian Weekend. The merged publication was renamed Today the following year and ceased publication in 1982.

== Legacy ==
Along with Weekend and Star Weekly, The Canadian was one of the principal Canadian newspaper supplements of the 1960s and 1970s. The competition between The Canadian and Weekend dominated the market for newspaper-distributed magazines until their merger in 1979.

== See also ==
- Weekend (magazine)
- Star Weekly
- Southam Inc.
