= Roslin, Ontario =

Coordinates: 44.349°N 77.334°W

Location of Roslin in Ontario

Roslin is an unincorporated community in the municipality of Centre Hastings, Ontario, Canada.

Roslin was the birthplace of C. F. Hamilton, first liaison and intelligence officer for the Royal Canadian Mounted Police. Chisholm's Mills, operated by Chisholm Lumber, is located nearby.

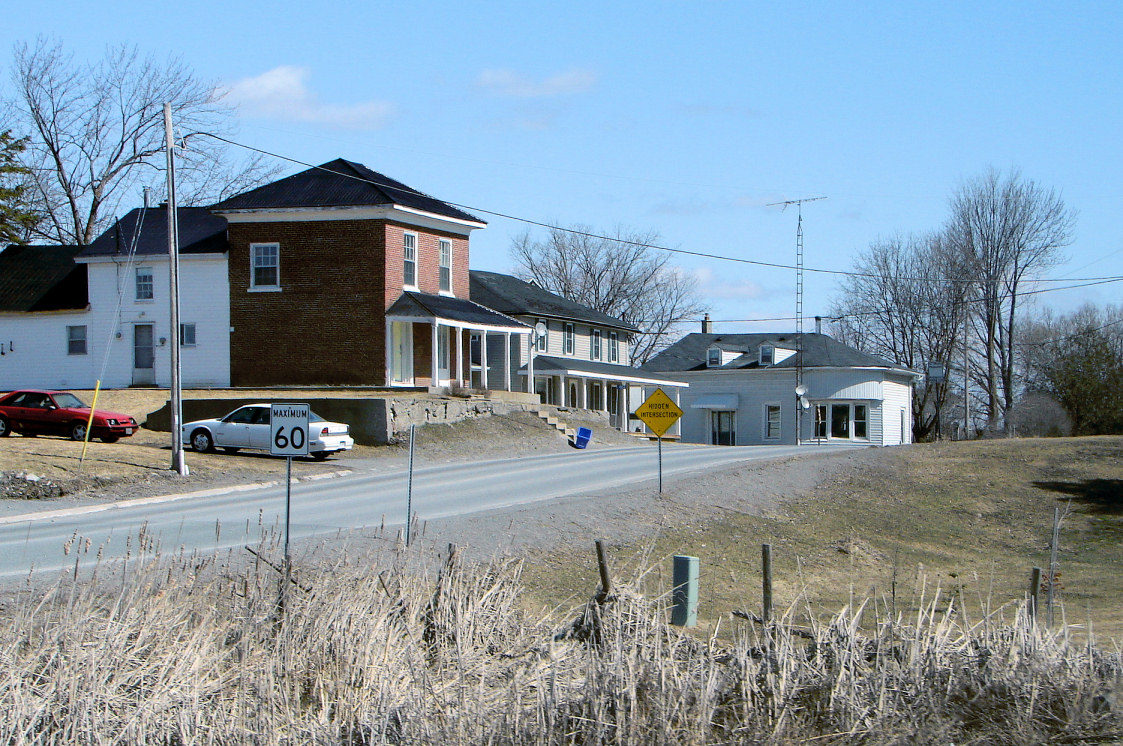
Roslin, Ontario
