= Leslie Coppold =

Leslie George Murray Coppold
- Born: June 22, 1914; Montréal, Québec Canada
- Died: July 18, 2007 (aged 93); Montréal, Québec, Canada
- Citizenship: Canadian
- Education: École des Beux Arts, Montréal
- Occupations: Painter, Illustrator, Designer, Educator
- Spouse: Geraldine Hope née Traversy
- Children: Murray, Janet, and Jennifer
- Parent(s): Giuseppe 'Joseph' Coppold and Ann Sim

Leslie George Murray Coppold RCA (22 June 1914 – 18 July 2007) was a Canadian painter, illustrator, and designer. Coppold worked in advertising as an art director, illustrator, and graphic and exhibition designer, while pursuing their passion for painting. Elected to the Royal Canadian Academy of Arts in 1950, paintings of theirs are held by the Québec Museum of Art and the Montréal Museum of Fine Arts, in addition to private and corporate collections.

== Family ==
Born in Montréal, Québec, Canada 22 June 1914 to father Giuseppe and mother Ann, Coppold grew up on the city's west side. On 23 August 1947, Coppold wed Geraldine Hope Traversy. The couple had a son, Murray, and two daughters, Janet and Jennifer.

== Education ==
Coppold attended West Hill High School. Afterward they enrolled in the École des Beux Arts, Montréal and studied drawing under Henri Charpentier and Maurice Félix. Coppold also spent one year of study at the Ontario College of Art in Toronto. Coppold later founded their own art school, the Académie des Beaux Arts in Montréal.

== Work ==
In 1935, Coppold was issued a letter patent from the Lieutenant-Governor of the Province of Québec to incorporate as an artist. But, their father died that same year and Coppold was forced to borrow money to pay for the funeral. They then sought work as a designer to support their family. In 1936, they joined Taylor Advertising as an art director and worked there until 1976, eventually rising to the position of vice president. At the firm, Coppold gained recognition as an exhibition designer and graphic designer. They designed the Canadian national exhibit at the 1939 New York World's Fair and the Bell Telephone Pavilion at Expo 67 in Montréal. During the Second World War, Coppold designed victory bonds and war posters. After the war, in 1947 Coppold designed a well-known promotional poster for the Canadian Government Travel Bureau, an assignment they completed on their wedding day. In 1975, Coppold founded their own art school, the Académie des Beaux Arts. They taught their last class there two weeks before passing away on 18 July 2007. Among their students had been Jon Joanis.

== Art ==
Coppold produced numerous paintings and drawings. A preferred medium was water color. Common subjects included landscapes, streetscapes, and representations of buildings. Coppold also portrayed the human figure. The style of Coppold's landscape paintings has been characterized as "semi-abstract" and "expressionistic". Coppold was reluctant to sell their paintings.

== Recognition and awards ==
Coppold's Fourth Prize winning entry in the 1963 Canadian Art flag design contest.

- In 1950, they were elected to the Royal Canadian Academy of Arts.
- In 1963, they were one of five Fourth Prize winners in a joint Canadian Art and Weekend/Perspectives magazine contest to design a national flag for Canada.
- Paintings by Coppold are included in the collections of the Québec Museum of Art and the Montréal Museum of Fine Art.
