= Archer Fortescue Duguid =

Scottish-Canadian historian (1887–1976)

Colonel Archer Fortescue Duguid OBE DSO CD
- Born: 31 August 1887; Bourtie House, Aberdeenshire, Scotland
- Died: 4 January 1976 (aged 88); Kingston, Ontario, Canada
- Education: Fettes College; McGill University (B.Sc 1912)
- Spouses: Naomi Winslow (m. 1916) Frances Winslow (m. 1921)
- Military career
- Allegiance: Canada
- Branch: Canadian Expeditionary Force; Canadian Militia; Canadian Army
- Service years: 1914–1947
- Rank: Colonel
- Units: Canadian Field Artillery; Historical Section
- Conflicts: World War I

Colonel Archer Fortescue "Scotty" Duguid OBE DSO CD (31 August 1887 – 4 January 1976) was a Scottish-Canadian engineer, army officer, historian, and vexillologist. Duguid was raised in Scotland and moved to Canada in 1906 to study at McGill University. In 1914 he received a commission in the Canadian Expeditionary Force (CEF) and served as an artillery officer in World War I. Following the war, in 1921 he was appointed director of the Canadian Militia's Historical Section, a position he held until 1945. He remained the official historian of the CEF until his retirement in 1947. In 1938, Duguid published the first and only entry in a planned eight-volume official history of Canada's participation in the Great War. Duguid was a noted expert in heraldry and vexillology, and designed a service flag for the Canadian Army that was in use from 1939 to 1944. He later modified the design as a proposed national flag of Canada. Among his other work as director of the Historical Section, Duguid designed the Memorial Chamber of the Peace Tower and was responsible for establishing red and white as the national colours of Canada. Duguid died in Kingston, Ontario, in 1976 at age 88.

== Biography ==
=== Early life ===
Archer Fortescue Duguid was born at Bourtie House, Aberdeenshire, to Peter Duguid (1817–1898) and Isobel Barclay Irvine-Fortescue (1854–1952). He was a cousin of Sir Thomas Innes of Learney. Duguid attended Aberdeen Grammar School and later Fettes College. In 1906 he moved to Montreal to study engineering at McGill University, where he graduated in 1912. During university, he intended on a career in the British Army and in 1910 passed in qualifying exams. That year, he was given a temporary commission in the Royal Canadian Horse Artillery. After graduation, he elected to take jobs with the Grand Trunk Pacific Railway and Canadian Northern Montreal Tunnel and Terminal Company rather than pursue a commission.

=== World War I ===
On 11 June 1914, Duguid was commissioned in the 29th Battery, 6th Brigade, Canadian Field Artillery. After Britain declared war on 4 August, on 29 August Duguid was posted to the general staff of the 2nd Brigade, CFA. Duguid sailed to England that fall and arrived on 14 October. On 9 February 1915, he landed in France with the 1st Canadian Division. Duguid fought in the Second Battle of Ypres, Battle of Festubert, and Battle of Givenchy before being invalided to England in August of that year. On 27 September he was posted to the 8th (Howitzer) Brigade, CFA, and on 24 October was promoted to captain. The 8th became the 6th shortly thereafter.

On 18 January 1916 returned to France with his new unit. He fought with the 6th in the Actions of St Eloi Craters. In May he transferred to the 5th Brigade and fought with them in the Battle of Mount Sorrel and the Battle of the Somme.

On 22 March 1917, shortly before the Battle of Vimy Ridge, he was posted as brigade major to the staff of the 2nd Canadian Divisional Artillery, and on 1 May was promoted to major. He was wounded on 3 June 1917 but remained on duty and fought in the Battle of Hill 70 and the Battle of Passchendaele. On 29 April 1918 he was posted to the staff of the 3rd Canadian Division, where he remained until the end of the war. Duguid was awarded the Distinguished Service Order on 3 June 1918. On 10 February 1919 he returned to England.

=== Historical Section ===
On 16 June 1919 he was transferred to Canadian Corps Headquarters in England and assigned to the Canadian War Narrative Section (CWNS). Duguid returned to Canada in July 1919 and was retained by the army to continue his historical work. The Canadian Army Historical Section had been formed on 15 November 1918 when Brigadier Ernest Alexander Cruikshank was appointed, by Order in Council P.C. 2814, "Director of the Historical Section of the General Staff." On 14 May 1921, Duguid succeeded Cruickshank to become the Section's second director, and a month later, the activities of the CWNS were merged into the Historical Section.

During his tenure as director of the section, his major undertaking was an official history of the Canadian Expeditionary Force in World War I. Of the intended eight volumes, Duguid completed only one, which was published in 1938. A complete history of the CEF was not completed until Colonel G. W. L. Nicholson published his Canadian Expeditionary Force, 1914–1919 in 1962.

The 1939–44 flag of the Canadian Army, designed by Duguid

In 1939, Duguid designed a battle flag for the Canadian Army. Duguid's design borrowed elements from the coat of arms of Canada, and adhered to the Royal Proclamation of 21 November 1921 that said Canada's national emblem was three maple leaves on a single stem on a white field. In a 1964 testimony, Duguid explained the history of his design:

In the Second World War, Canadian units did not carry flags or colours. Just before they proceeded overseas I was ordered to produce a suitable flag for the First Canadian Division. I first decided that the most important thing was to make sure of the national colours of Canada and the national device because it seemed to me that they were obviously the main items for any such flag. On looking at the armorial bearings of Canada, the other obvious item was that there were to flag showing, one of which was the Union Jack and the other a blue flag with three fleur-de-lis. So I placed on the white flag with the three red maple leaves, a union jack on the upper corner next to the staff, which was one seventh of the area of the whole flag. Then I wondered how to include the three fleur-de-lis on the blue ground and I found that a proper heraldic method of introducing such a device was to put a circle in the fly. So I put a blue circle in the upper fly with three gold fleur-de-lis. I had that made and I handed it to General [Andrew] McNaughton just as he was boarding the train to go overseas with the First Division. That flag was flown, so the record has it, from the merchant ship on which the headquarters of the First Division proceeded overseas. While on board it was blessed and consecrated. On the other side, it was flown in the Headquarters of the First Canadian Division. When His Majesty the King came to review the First Canadian Division, that flag was flying and the General Officer Commanding the First Canadian Division had a small flag on the cap of his radiator on his car. He had one made very similar to that, a small flag, and presented it to the King who accepted it and I think expressed approval.

Duguid's flag was unpopular and was disused after 22 January 1944. Consequently, Canada's battle flag in the Invasion of Europe was the Canadian Red Ensign.

During the 1945-46 Flag Committee hearings, Duguid was one of the expert witnesses to testify. Duguid appeared before the committee on 4 December 1945. In his speech, he argued that Canada's national colours were red and white, and that its national emblem was three maple leaves on a single stem on a white field. This, Duguid argued, had been established by Royal Proclamation on by George V on 21 November 1921. Regarding the national symbol, he said, "the selection of the maple leaf as the national of Canada reflects the transition from the Land of the Beaver to the Land of the Maple. [...] This maple leaf of ours is well and widely known today, everywhere reminiscent of Canada, having been worn by Canadian soldiers in 1914–1919 and having more recently been placed on the funnels of ships of the Royal Canadian Navy and on war vehicles and on every packing case containing war supplies made in Canada [...]."

On 22 October 1945, Colonel Charles Perry Stacey succeeded Duguid as the director of the Historical Section. At this time, Duguid took the position of Official Historian of the Canadian Expeditionary Force, where he continued his work on the official history. Duguid retired from the army on 24 October 1947.

=== Later life ===
On 5 January 1948, Duguid was awarded the Order of the British Empire. Duguid also designed a modified version of the battle flag as a proposed national flag of Canada but this design was not adopted.

=== Personal life ===
On 17 June 1916 at St Mary Abbots in Kensington, Duguid married Naomi Winslow (1888–1920), daughter of Edward Pelham Winslow of Winnipeg. The Winslows were direct descendants of Mayflower passenger Edward Winslow. Naomi died on 4 April 1920, just over a month after giving birth to their son Adrian (1920–1969). On 1 June 1921, Duguid remarried to Naomi's younger sister, Frances Charlotte Winslow (1890–1953), at the Winslow family house in Winnipeg. Scotty and Frances had four daughters: Penelope (1922–2014), Isobel (1923–2010), Elizabeth (1928–2019), and Margaret. Archer Fortescue Duguid died on 4 January 1976, age 88, in Kingston at his daughter Isobel's house. The funeral service was held in the chapel at the Robert J. Reid Funeral Home in Kingston, and he was buried in Ottawa.

== Works ==
- Official history of the Canadian forces in the Great War, 1914–1919 (1938) J. O. Patenaude, Printer to the King, Ottawa. OCLC 758239
- History of the Canadian Grenadier Guards, 1760–1964 (1965) Gazette Print. Co., Montreal. OCLC 13442284

== Further information ==
- Duguid's service record at Library and Archives Canada: https://www.bac-lac.gc.ca/eng/discover/military-heritage/first-world-war/personnel-records/Pages/item.aspx?IdNumber=368639
- A. Fortescue Duguid fonds at the National Defence Headquarters Directorate of History and Heritage.
