= Anthony Mann (designer) =

British-Canadian designer (1927–2013)

- Born: October 18, 1927; Rotherham, West Riding of Yorkshire, England
- Died: April 19, 2013 (aged 85); Ashreigney, Devon, England
- Education: Central School of Art and Design, London, England
- Occupations: Designer (Industrial, Exhibition, Graphic), Educator
- Spouse(s): Barbara Mann, née Sweetman
- Children: Timothy Mann
- Parent(s): James Mann and Olga (Newey) Mann

Anthony (Tony) Mann (18 October 1927 – 19 April 2013) was a British-Canadian designer (industrial, exhibition, and graphic) and educator. Mann was an exponent of the modernist International Typographic Style and helped found the Design Program at the Nova Scotia College of Art and Design. He was also an environmentalist and avid toy-maker.

== Family ==
Born in Rotherham, Lancashire, England on 18 October 1927 to father Wing Commander James Mann and mother Olga (Newey) Mann. Mann grew up both in England and India, returning to England after the Second World War. Mann married Barbara Sweetman with whom he had a son, Timothy.

== Work ==
Mann initially worked as product designer for the General Electric Company, but from 1951 to 1962 worked as a freelance exhibition designer in London. Notable commissions included a 1960 exhibit to celebrate Nigerian independence and a Libyan International Trade Fair in Tripoli. Mann became interested in the design ideas of the Swiss design and the International Typographic Style, but encountered lack of client interest in work based on these ideas in Britain at the time. Mann was motivated to emigrate to Canada in 1962 by the pioneering work being done in the International Style by Rolf Harder and Ernst Roch. Mann initially worked briefly as a designer at the CBC, but was soon hired as creative director at type house Cooper & Beatty, replacing Allan Fleming.

While at Cooper & Beatty, Mann designed promotional materials and redesigned the company's own identity system, including its logo and envelopes. The head of the firm, Jack Trevett, demanded that Mann's logo be redesigned in an historicist fashion more consistent with the British typographic tradition than the International Typographic Style, and Mann reluctantly agreed.

Mann also played a role in the selection of the official logo of the 1967 Canadian Centennial Celebration. The choice of an appointed panel of five judges headed by designer Frank Davies in an open competition was rejected by Centennial Commissioner John Fisher. Fisher was unhappy with the judges' selection due to its resemblance to an existing commercial trademark and approached Cooper & Beatty to lead a new effort. C&B drafted a brief on recommended requirements for a Centennial logo that was accepted by the Commission. Mann then approached the Ottawa-based design firm Paul Arthur+Associates to collaborate on the effort. Jointly, they chose two designs to present to the commission for approval: one by Cooper & Beatty's own Stuart Ash, that had already been awarded Fourth Prize by the Davies-led panel and another by Paul Arthur+Associates's Gerhard Doerrié. The commission selected Ash's design to be the Centennial emblem.

In 1965, while still working at Cooper & Beatty, Mann formed an interdisciplinary design group, Design Collaborative, with Rolf Harder, Ernst Roch, and the industrial designer Al Faux. Harder and Roch operated the Montreal office and focused on graphic design, while Mann and Faux were based in Toronto and focused on three dimensional design projects. Mann and Faux would contribute project design for Clairtone's G2 Stereo system and G-TV.

In 1967, Mann was invited to co-found the Design Program at the Nova Scotia College of Art and Design (NSCAD), and taught there full-time from 1967 to 1976. There he also helped found the Environmental Design Program. In 1978, Mann returned to England with his family but returned to NSCAD each fall to lead the first semester until his retirement in 1999.

== Later life ==
In retirement, Mann took up residence in Devon, England. There he focused on making toys and automata and engaged in advocacy work with the Devon Guild of Craftsmen. He died of Leukemia 19 April 2013 in Ashreigney, Devon, after a brief illness.

== Design philosophy ==
"Mann's graphic design was often infused with wit, playfulness, and a deep human sensibility. At the same time, he believed strongly in the designer's responsibility to contribute to society – using their skills to improve lives and foster positive change. Beyond his professional work, he was also a lifelong creator of remarkable toys and games, many of which are still held in private collections." – Rod McDonald

"He was drawn to a functionalist tradition linking Modern Swiss and German design with the International Style."

== Notable designs ==
Mann's entry in the 1963 Canadian Art and Weekend/Perspectives national flag design contest, awarded Honorable Mention.

- 1960 principal, Nigerian independence exhibition, Victoria Island, Lagos
- 1963 entry in the joint Canadian Art and Weekend/Perspectives magazine contest to design a national flag for Canada was awarded Honorable Mention
- 1964 redesign of Cooper and Beatty's identity system, including logo and envelope
- Clairtone's G2 Stereo system and G-TV, with Al Faux
- 1974 commemorative Canadian silver coins for the Montréal Olympics, series II

== Membership and honors ==
- Society of Typographic Designers of Canada (TDC), Member
- Design Professionals of Canada (DesCan), Fellow
- Devon Guild of Craftsman, Honorary member
- British Toymakers Guild, Honorary member
