= Manly E. MacDonald =

Canadian impressionistic painter

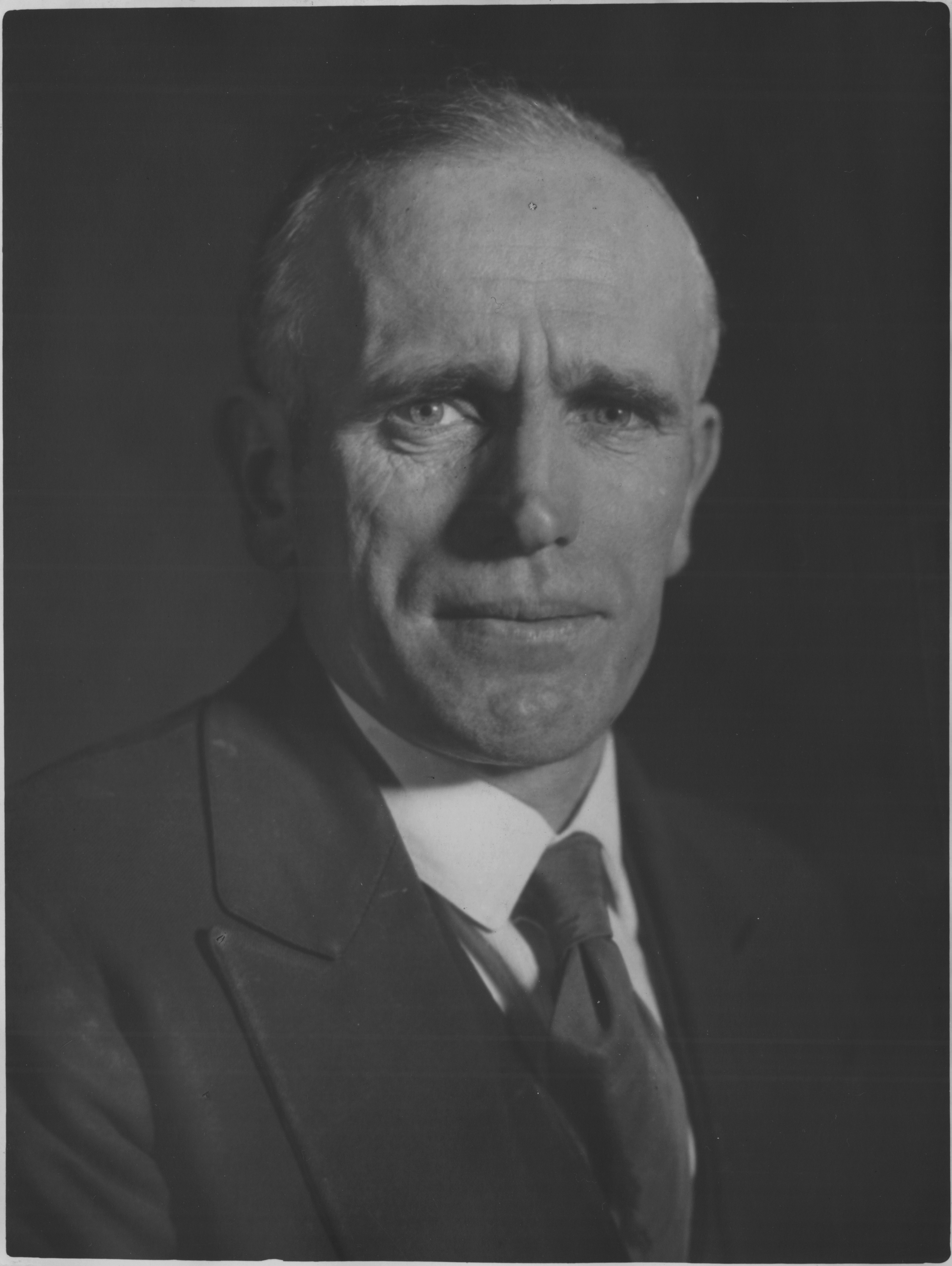
- MacDonald in 1930
- Born: Manly Edward Macdonald; August 15, 1889; Point Anne, Ontario, Canada
- Died: April 10, 1971 (aged 81); Toronto, Ontario, Canada
- Education: Ontario School of Art and Industrial Design, Albright School of Art in Buffalo, School of the Museum of Fine Arts, Boston
- Known for: Painter, etcher
- Movement: impressionistic
- Spouse: Beverly Lambe

Manly Edward MacDonald (August 15, 1889 – April 10, 1971) was a Canadian impressionistic painter who was born in Point Anne, close to Belleville, Ontario.

== Life and career ==
He was the son of William MacDonald, a farmer and fisherman who immigrated to Canada from England. His work captured and recorded en plein air rural Ontario practices such as ploughing, cutting ice, collecting sap, logging and fishing. He is particularly renowned for his depictions of working horses in flowing motion, streams and gristmills. MacDonald also painted landscapes and many portraits of family and local dignitaries.

While most of his work is oil-on-board or oil-on-canvas, he also worked in pastels and various etching methods. In 1908, at the age of 19, MacDonald was enrolled at the Ontario School of Art, later the Ontario College of Art & Design (OCAD). In 1911, he also took courses at the Albright School of Art in Buffalo, New York and the School of the Boston Museum of Fine Arts. In 1917, he received a scholarship from the Royal Canadian Academy (RCA) enabling him to travel in Europe during WWI. In 1922, he held his first public exhibition held in Belleville, Ontario; in 1924 and 1925, his work was included in the first British Empire Exhibition at Wembley, and secondly at the new Canadian Pavilion. In 1938, he exhibited at the London Tate Gallery's Canadian exhibition and in 1939 at the New York World's Fair. In 1943, he began to teach at the Ontario College of Art.

Late in life, MacDonald was an active member of the Ontario Society of Artists (OSA) to which he was elected in 1918 and the Royal Canadian Academy (RCA) (he was appointed an associate member). In 1958, Manly MacDonald became a founding member of the Ontario Institute of Painters (OIP).

Although MacDonald was a reserved family man, he was embroiled in controversy over traditional versus modernist styles. This ultimately led him and three fellow OSA members (among them Kenneth Forbes and Marion Long) to resign from the OSA in 1951 on the basis that it was being dominated by modernists and not fulfilling its role of encouraging fine arts in Ontario. On the other hand, Modernists such as Graham Coughtry complained that "every damn tree in the country has been painted."

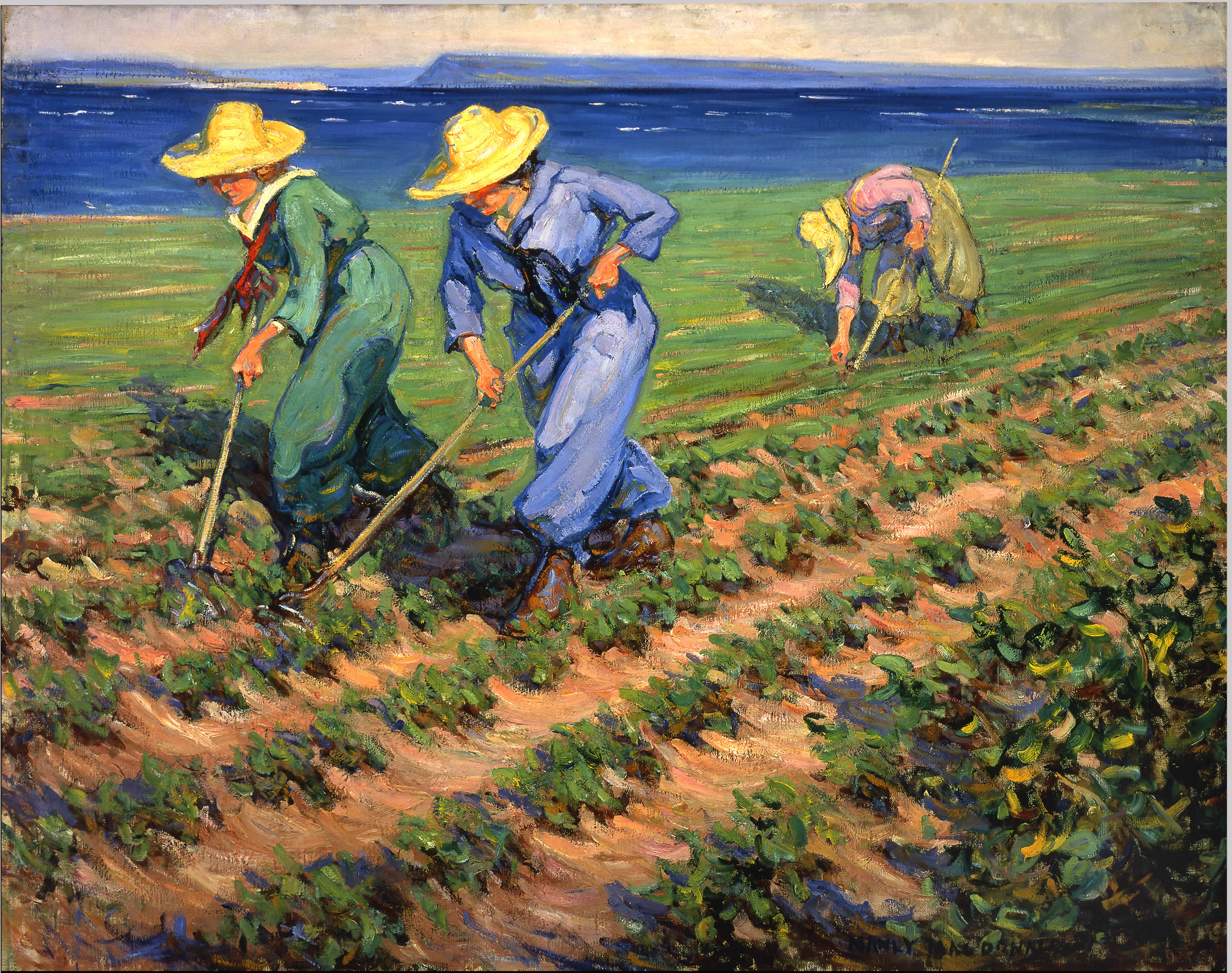
1918-1919 Land Girls Hoeing

Towards the end of the First World War in 1918, MacDonald was commissioned to paint scenes to document Canada's war effort. The Women in War Series illustrates how women left their traditional roles to support the gathering of food while men were away at war. Macdonald's Land Girls Hoeing is part of the collection of the Canadian War Museum in Ottawa, Ontario. Another important commission for MacDonald was a 1959 painting of the Toronto skyline that was the city of Toronto's gift to Queen Elizabeth II. The traditionalist versus modernist tensions continued with MacDonald's style of painting described by the OSA as an insult to Her Majesty. However the same painting, now part of the Queen's Royal Collection at Sandringham, was described by MacDonald as "sane" and one which the Queen would understand. MacDonald continued to paint until his very last days. He died on 10 April 1971 having completed about 2000 works. Many of his works are in the permanent collections of public galleries such as the National Gallery of Canada and Art Gallery of Ontario, with large semi-permanent displays at the John M. Parrott Art Gallery at the Belleville Public Library and at the Loyalist College Library, also in Belleville.

== Bibliography ==
- Beale, Charles (2010). Manly Edward MacDonald, Interpreter of Old Ontario. Napanee: Plumley Press. ISBN 978-0-9865068-0-2.
- Murray, Joan (1996). Confessions of a Curator: Adventures in Canadian Art. ISBN 978-1-4597-2041-1.
