= Nardi (agricultural machinery manufacturer) =

Italian plow manufacturing company

Nardi Group Spa
- Company type: Società per azioni SpA
- Industry: Agricultural equipment
- Founded: 1895; 131 years ago
- Founder: Francesco Nardi
- Headquarters: Selci Lama, Perugia, Italy
- Products: Ploughs, harrows, seed drills
- Website: www.grupponardi.it

The Nardi Group is an Italian manufacturers of agricultural machinery such as ploughs, harrows, and seed drills. As of 2020, its products are distributing in 85 countries worldwide.

It is based in Selci Lama, San Giustino in the Province of Perugia and specializes in the production of ploughs. It says that it has built the 'largest specimen'.

The Nardi Group is also the owner of the brands Marzia and Sogema, which were family holding companies folded into the main company in the early 2000s.

== History ==
The company was founded by Francesco Nardi in 1895.

In December 2017, after financial difficulties, the Nardi group was sold to Xete Investments, and English company that aimed to restructure the business. Following the sale, a period of strong conflict began between the new owners of the company (determined to drastically reduce staff numbers) and the trade unions, which led to 23 consecutive days of strike action with pickets and blocking of incoming and outgoing goods.

The company eventually signed an agreement with the unions and the layoffs were revoked. The company won a big order from Eritrea that year which allowed the company to return to pre-crisis levels of production. By 2019 the company was back in profit and by 2023 the company had increased its revenue above the levels from the year following the acquisition by the new owners.

== See also ==
- List of Italian companies
