= Star Weekly =

Defunct Canadian periodical magazine (1910–1973)

- Frequency: weekly
- Founder: Joseph E. Atkinson
- Founded: 1910
- Final issue: 1973
- Company: Toronto Star
- Country: Canada
- Based in: Toronto
- Language: English

The Star Weekly magazine was a Canadian periodical published from 1910 until 1973. The publication was read widely in rural Canada where delivery of daily newspapers was infrequent.

== History ==
=== Formation ===
The newspaper was founded as the Toronto Star Weekly by Joseph E. Atkinson as a Canadian equivalent of British Sunday editions. it began as a 16-page publication. According to one retrospective, "Its weekly menu included feature articles about important issues of the day; offbeat, funny stories; sports features with big, bold photos that made the heroes of hockey, baseball and boxing jump right off the page and, each week, a condensed novel published in serial form, often by one of the most popular authors of the day." A key feature of the magazine was its extensive section of colour comics which was inaugurated in 1913 and became a major driver of the publication's circulation success.

In 1924, the Toronto Star Weekly absorbed the rival Sunday World to become the only weekend magazine in Toronto. In 1938, as a reflection of its national ambitions, the name became The Star Weekly. The publication included feature articles, fiction, recipes, sports, lifestyle articles, 20 pages of colour comics among other elements. At its peak, in the early 1960s, the magazine averaged 108 pages and sold over one million copies a week and also sold 30,000 copies in the United States.

=== Later collaboration with Southam ===
In 1965, the Star Weekly went from being published by the Toronto Star alone to being published by Southstar Publishers, a consortium of the Toronto Star and Southam Press that also launched The Canadian as a weekend supplement and competitor to Weekend. Jointly, they produced The Canadian/Star Weekly as a newsstand edition for communities that did not receive a newspaper with The Canadian as a supplement while the Star Weekly served as a supplement in the Saturday edition of the Toronto Star.

In 1968, the Star Weekly was purchased outright by Southam and merged with its weekend supplement, The Canadian Magazine and continued to be published as The Canadian/Star Weekly, which was provided for free as a weekend supplement in the Saturday Star and also sold as a standalone on newspaper stands across the country for 20 cents. On December 26, 1973 the Star Weekly ceased publication entirely and The Canadian became the Toronto Star's weekend supplement.

== Staff and contributors ==
Until 1968, the Weekly shared many of the staff from the daily Toronto Daily Star. Notable contributors to the Star Weekly included Robert W. Service, Morley Callaghan, Nina Moore Jamieson, Ernest Hemingway, Arthur Lismer, Fred Varley, C.W. Jefferys, A. D. Kean, Sylvia Fraser, Nellie McClung, Robert Thomas Allen and Jimmy Frise, whose cartoon Bridseye Centre appeared in the magazine for several decades. The last editor of the original Star Weekly until its 1968 sale and merger was Peter Gzowski who later gained fame as a broadcaster. Pierre Berton was a frequent contributor and served as associate editor from 1958 to 1962.

== See also ==
- Montreal Standard, a similar publication which became the newspaper supplement Weekend after 1951.
- The Canadian, the newspaper supplement that absorbed Star Weekly.
- List of newspapers in Canada
