= Alan Beddoe =

Canadian artist, heraldry consultant (1893–1975)

Alan Brookman Beddoe
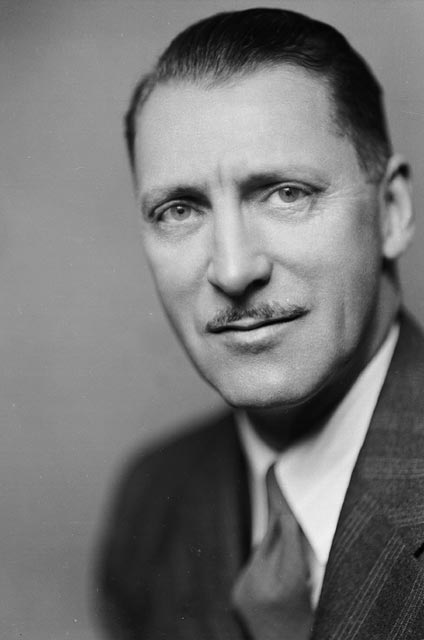
- Alan Brookman Beddoe
- Born: June 1, 1893; Ottawa, Ontario, Canada
- Died: December 2, 1975 (aged 82)
- Allegiance: Canada
- Branch: Royal Canadian Navy
- Rank: Lieutenant-commander
- Awards: OC, OBE, HFHS, FHSC
- Other work: artist, war artist, consultant in heraldry and founder and first president of the Heraldry Society of Canada

Lieutenant-Commander Alan Brookman Beddoe, OC, OBE, HFHS, FHSC (June 1, 1893 – December 2, 1975) was a Canadian artist, war artist, consultant in heraldry and founder and first president of the Heraldry Society of Canada in 1965.

Born in Ottawa, Ontario, in 1893, he studied at Ashbury College. During World War I, he was captured at Second Battle of Ypres in 1915 and spent two and a half years in the prisoner of war camps at Gießen and Zerbst. He studied art at the Ecole des Beaux-Arts in Paris. After the war, he studied at the Art Students League of New York under DuMond and Bridgman. In 1925, he opened the first commercial art studio in Ottawa. He was also an expert in heraldry. The Alan Beddoe collection at Library and Archives Canada contains designs and studies for the Book of Remembrance, postage stamps, posters, crests, money, architecture, coats-of-arms, and a new Canadian flag. His fonds include slides, colour transparencies, prints, watercolours and drawings related to Canadian heraldry.

== Books of Remembrance ==
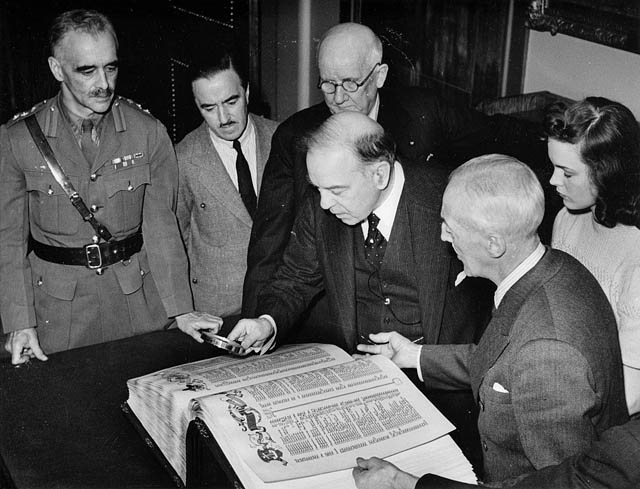
Books of Remembrance

Beddoe was instrumental in the creation of the major Books of Remembrance, now housed in the Peace Tower on Parliament Hill in Ottawa. The artist originally chosen for the job, James Purves, died in 1940, at which time Beddoe took on the task. He supervised a team of artists for about the next 2 years to illuminate and hand-letter the books, listing the names of Canadians who died in Canada's military service during World War I and after World War II he supervised another team of artists to create the Book of Remembrance for World War II. He was inducted to the OBE and received the Allied Arts Medal awarded by the Royal Architectural Institute for his work on the Books of Remembrance and made an officer of the Order of Canada. He also was instrumental in the creation of the South Africa Book of Remembrance 1956–1966; Yvonne Diceman, who had worked with him on the Book of Remembrance WWII, produced the Korea Book of Remembrance 1957–1958 and the Newfoundland Book of Remembrance 1972.

== Ships badges ==
The Royal Canadian Navy formed a Ships Badge Committee in 1942, and commissioned Beddoe to design official badges for the navy's ships. He designed badges for over 180 ships and establishments of the Royal Canadian Navy. In 1957, the Royal Canadian Navy appointed him its heraldic advisor. His designs for ship's badges including the designs for HMCS Kapuskasing, HMCS Magnificent, HMCS Sioux and HMCS Rockcliffe are in the Alan Beddoe collection at Library and Archives Canada.

== Images ==
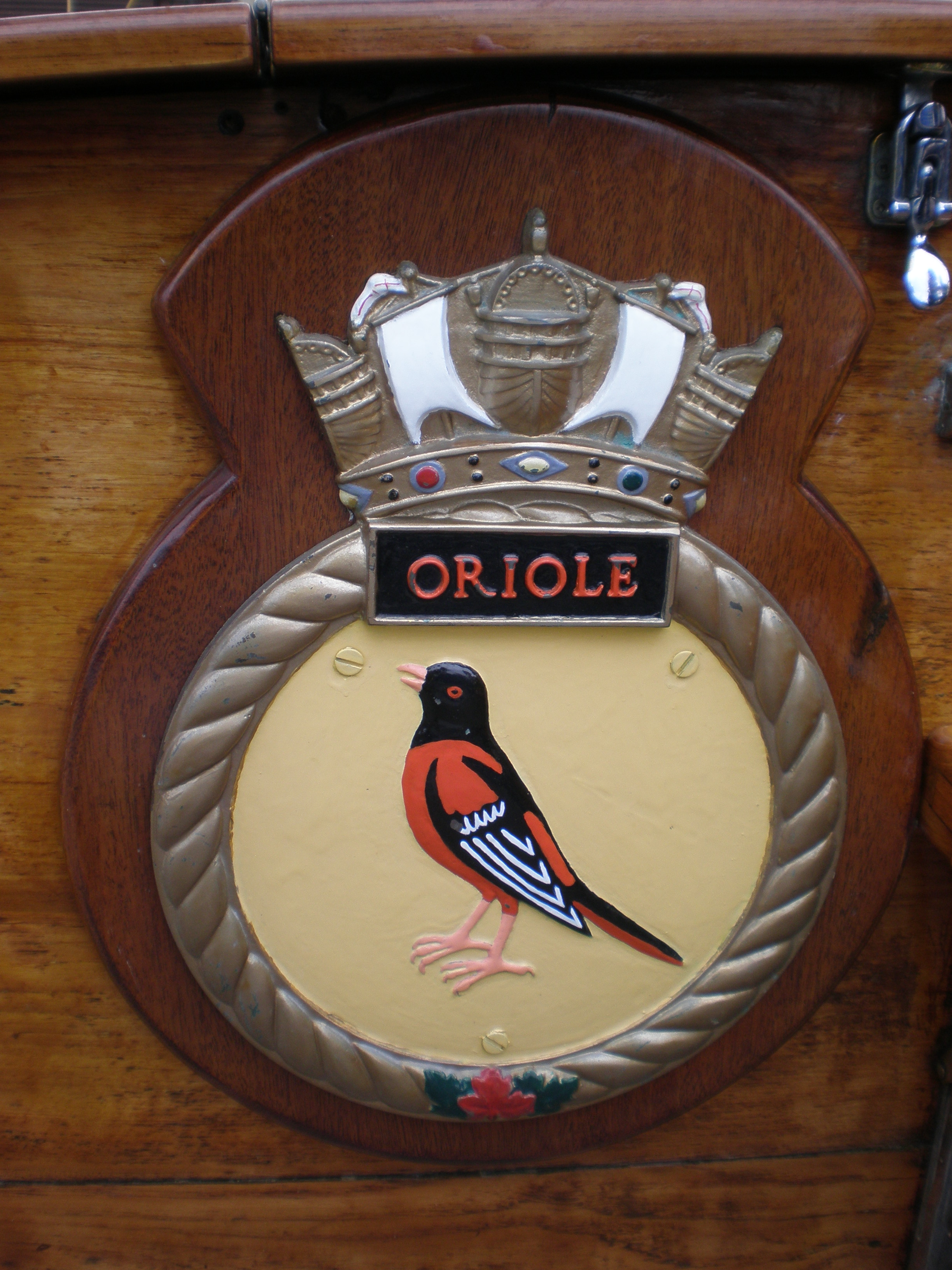
HMCS Oriole

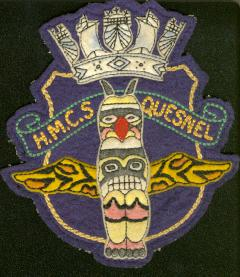
HMCS Quesnel

== Coats of arms ==
=== Provinces and territories ===
He painted watercolours of the coats of arms for Canada, provinces and territories. His fonds include preliminary sketches for the coat of arms of Newfoundland and Labrador, Quebec, New Brunswick, and Yukon. In 1956, he designed coats of arms for the Yukon and Northwest Territories.

Coat of arms of Yukon

Coat of arms of North West Territories

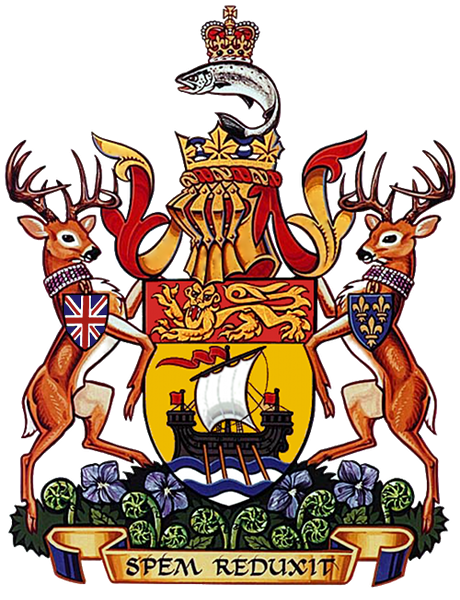
Coat of Arms New Brunswick

In 1957, he was asked to revise the Coat of Arms of Canada, and his version was in use until further changes were made in 1994.

=== Municipalities ===
He painted watercolours of municipal coats of arms for many Canadian municipalities. His fonds include the designs for the Township of Esquimalt (Vancouver Island), the City of Victoria, British Columbia, the City of Hamilton, Ontario and the Township of Gloucester, Ontario.

=== Universities ===
He designed coats of arms for a number of university coats of arms including Memorial University of Newfoundland, the University of Moncton and the University of Manitoba. Photographs of his watercolours entitled "Arms of the University of Windsor" and "The Bearings Massey College in the University of Toronto" (coat of arms) are in the Alan Beddoe collection at Library and Archives Canada.

=== Individuals ===
He designed the coats of arms for a number of individuals including Georges Vanier, Viscount Monk and Charles Vincent Massey. His fonds include a colour slide of the Earl of Dufferin's coat of arms and the armorial bearings of Georges Vanier, Governor General of Canada 1959–1967. He also designed the arboreal bearings for Richard Bedford Bennett, the Viscount Bennett.

=== Institutions ===
He designed the arms for a number of institutions, including the Royal Canadian Geographical Society, Cambrian College and the Royal Society of Canada and his fonds includes black-and-white photographs of the letters patent.

== Flag of Canada ==
During the Great Flag Debate of 1964, Beddoe was the primary advisor and artist to the prime minister Lester Pearson, the Cabinet and the Parliamentary Flag Committee, working on potential designs for the new flag. He designed the Pearson Pennant design with three red maple leaves on a white background with blue bars on either side representing "From sea to sea", and produced numerous other designs for consideration, including a single red maple leaf.

Flag of Canada competition 1964

Canada flag competition 1964

Canada flag competition 1964

== Art ==
Alan Beddoe was an artist. A drawing by Alan Beddoe entitled 'The Condemned Bridge' is in the Alan Beddoe collection at Library and Archives Canada. He created individual photographic portraits of Major Forbes Thrasher and John Wilfred Kennedy. He created group portraits of the Ottawa Choral Society, 1898, the Canadian Expeditionary Force, the Provincial Model School, Ottawa, Ontario, 1904–1905, and the 7th Officers' Disciplinary Training Class, Halifax, Nova Scotia, 1942.

== Book plates ==
He designed several hundred book plate designs. His book plate designs for Charles Clement Tudway, Henry J. Turner, Edward Milner, and George Stacey Gibson are in the Alan Beddoe collection at Library and Archives Canada.

== Legacy ==
In 1968, he was made an Officer of the Order of Canada. In 1943, he was made an Officer of the Order of the British Empire for services as a war artist. Alan Beddoe died in 1975. His legacy is also continued by his son, Charles Beddoe, who followed his footsteps in many ways.

== Publications ==
One of his most important contributions to the heraldry of Canada was Lt. Cdr. Alan Beddoe's book, Beddoe's Canadian Heraldry Rev. by Col. Strome Galloway, Belleville, Ontario: Mika Publishing Company, 1981.

- "Address on Heraldry" - by A. Beddoe n.d.
- "A Brief on the Subject of Heraldry in Canada" by A. Beddoe n.d.
- "A Commentary on Heraldry in Canada" - by A. Beddoe n.d.
- "Flags used in Canada" - by A.Beddoe n.d.
- "Heraldry in Canada" by A. Beddoe n.d.
- "Heraldry and Its Relation to Genealogy" by A. Beddoe n.d.
- "Some Notes about Heraldry in Canada" - by A. Beddoe n.d.
- "The Coat-of-Arms" - by A. Beddoe n.d.
- "The Heraldry of Canada" - by A. Beddoe n.d.
- "The Legal and Constitutional Position of Heraldry in Canada" by A. Beddoe

== Arms ==
Coat of arms of Alan Beddoe
Adopted 10 May 1960 (grant from the College of Arms); April 15, 2021 (registered by the Canadian Heraldic Authority posthumously) Crest A boar’s head erased Or charged on the neck with a maple leaf Gules; Escutcheon Argent a chevron Gules, on a chief wavy Azure a lion passant guardant Or resting the dexter forepaw on an escutcheon Argent charged with a maple leaf Gules Motto Memini (Latin for 'I remember')

== See also ==
- Canadian official war artists
- War artist
- Military art
