= Bourtie House =

Category A listed house in Bourtie, Aberdeenshire

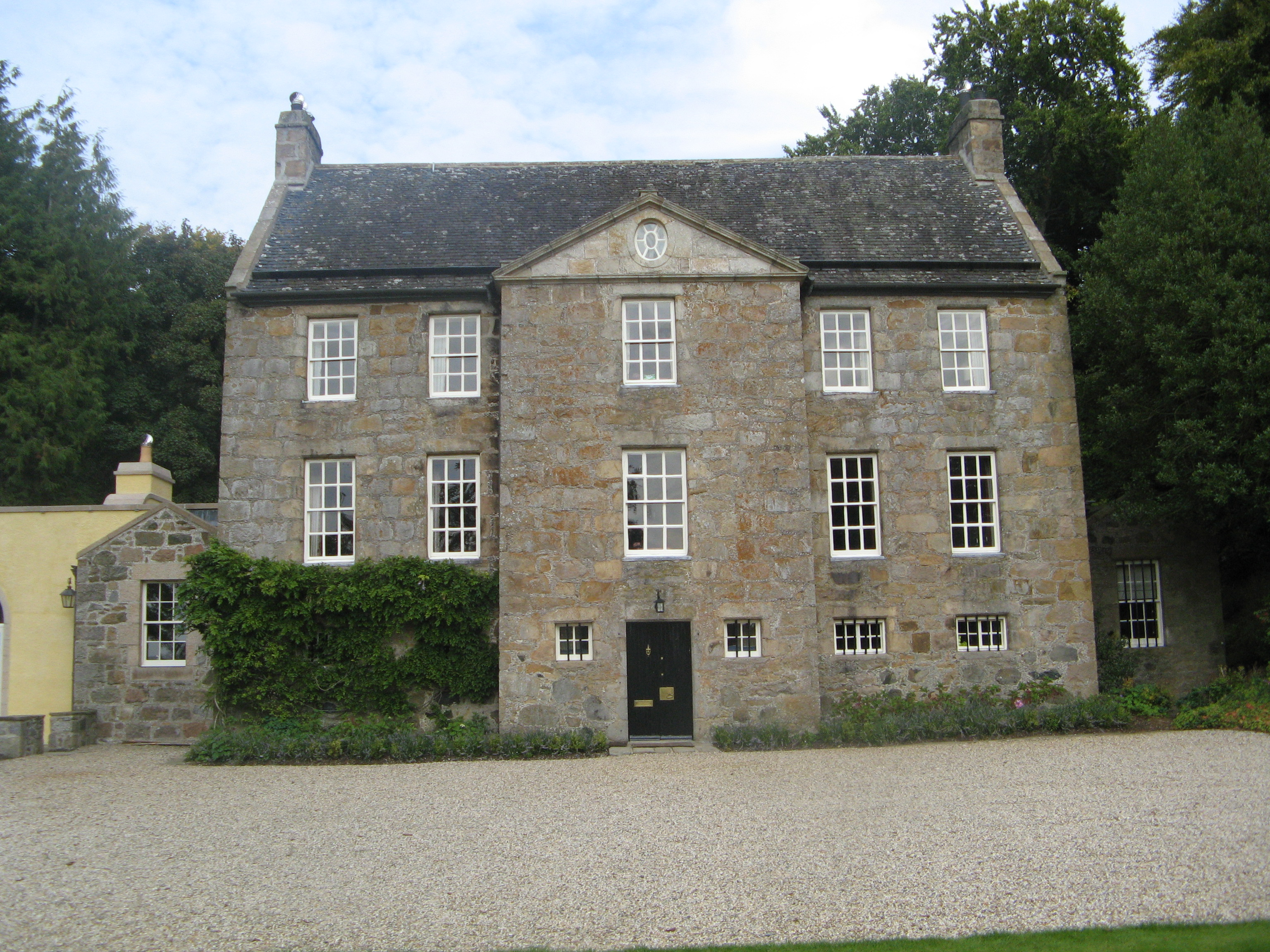
- The building in 2013
- Interactive map of the Bourtie House area

General information
- Location: Bourtie, Aberdeenshire, Scotland
- Coordinates: 57.306496°N 2.357764°W
- Completed: 1754 (272 years ago)

Technical details
- Floor count: 3

Bourtie House is a Category A listed country house in Bourtie, Aberdeenshire, Scotland. It dates to around 1754, and was designated a Category A listed building on 15 April 1971. It was originally the home of Patrick Anderson and Elizabeth Ogilvie. The house is three storeys in height and was originally built to a T-plan, later extended to an H-plan in 1884, while much of its interior survives largely intact.

== See also ==
- List of listed buildings in Aberdeenshire
