= Native Sons of Canada =

Native Sons of Canada.

The Native Sons of Canada was a Canadian nativist organization founded in 1921 in Victoria, British Columbia. It, along with the Ku Klux Klan and the Orange Order, was one of the preeminent nativist groups in the country. All three groups were "concerned about the social and biological 'threat' that non-Anglo-Saxon immigrants" posed to their society.
