= Tyendinaga, Ontario =

Tyendinaga
- Township (lower-tier)
- Township of Tyendinaga
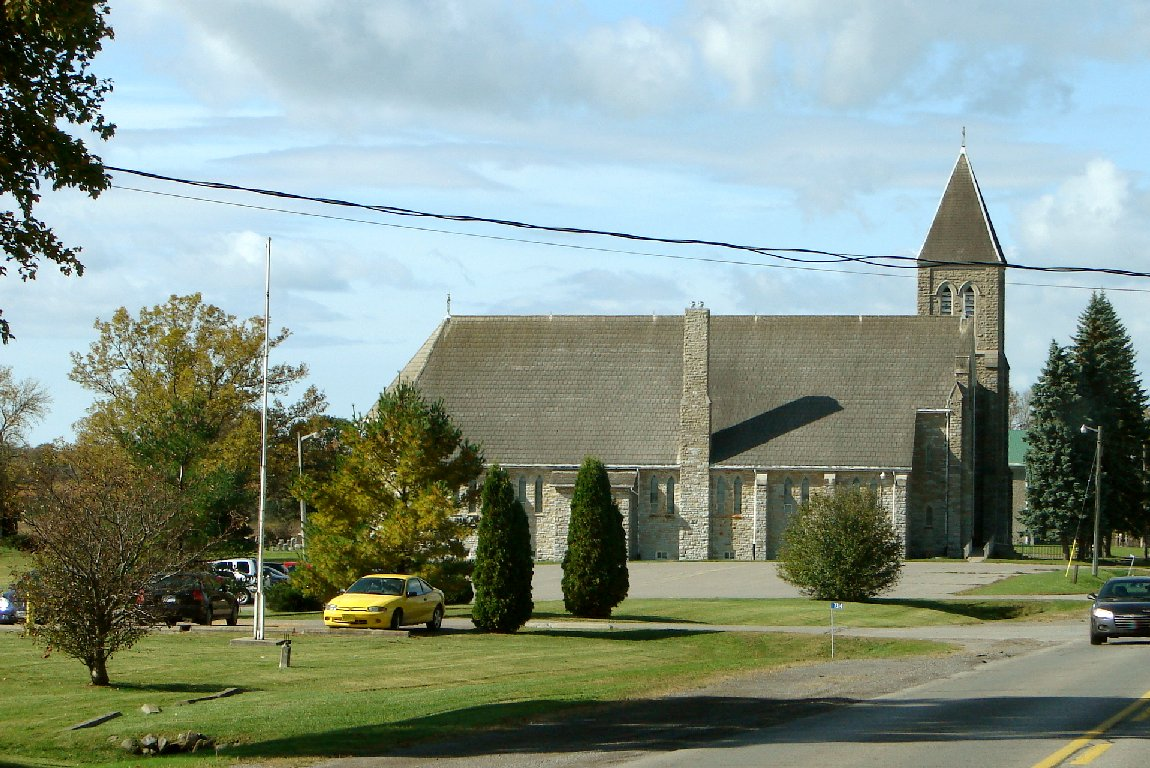
- Marysville

- Location within Southern Ontario
- Coordinates: 44°18′N 77°12′W
- Country: Canada
- Province: Ontario
- County: Hastings
- Incorporated: 1820

Government
  - Type: Township
  - Mayor: Adam Hannafin
  - Fed. riding: Hastings—Lennox and Addington—Tyendinaga
  - Prov. riding: Hastings—Lennox and Addington

Area
  - Land: 312.42 km^{2} (120.63 sq mi)

Population (2021)
  - Total: 4,538
  - Density: 14.5/km^{2} (38/sq mi)
- Time zone: UTC-5 (EST)
  - Summer (DST): UTC-4 (EDT)
- Postal Code: K0K
- Area codes: 613, 343
- Website: www.tyendinagatownship.com

Tyendinaga is a township in the Canadian province of Ontario, located in Hastings County. The community takes its name from a variant spelling of Mohawk leader Joseph Brant's traditional Mohawk name, Thayendanegea.

== Communities ==
The township comprises the communities of:

- Albert
- Blessington
- Chisholms Mills
- Ebenezer
- Halston
- Kingsford
- Lonsdale
- Lonsdale Station
- Melrose
- Marysville
- Milltown
- Myrehall
- Naphan
- Read
- Shannonville

A radio transmitter for the Canadian Broadcasting Corporation is located in Read. Saint Charles Borromeo Cemetery is also located in Read.

== Demographics ==
In the 2021 Census of Population conducted by Statistics Canada, Tyendinaga had a population of 4,538 living in 1,650 of its 1,730 total private dwellings, a change of 7.4% from its 2016 population of 4,226. With a land area of 312.42 km^{2} (120.63 sq mi), it had a population density of 14.5/km^{2} (37.6/sq mi) in 2021.

Canada census – Tyendinaga, Ontario community profile

	2021	2016	2011
Population	4,538 (+7.4% from 2016)	4,297 (+3.5% from 2011)	4,150 (+2.0% from 2006)
Land area	312.42 km^{2} (120.63 sq mi)	312.92 km^{2} (120.82 sq mi)	313.00 km^{2} (120.85 sq mi)
Population density	14.5/km^{2} (38/sq mi)	13.7/km^{2} (35/sq mi)	13.3/km^{2} (34/sq mi)
Median age	42.4 (M: 42.0, F: 42.8)	42.5 (M: 42.5, F: 42.6)
Private dwellings	1,730 (total) 1,650 (occupied)	1,631 (total)	1,547 (total)
Median household income	$98,000	$81,408

Notes: 2021 change percentage based on revised 2016 population count of 4,226.
References: 2021 2016 2011

Historical census populations – Tyendinaga, Ontario

Year	Pop.	±%
1871	7,573	—
1881	7,832	+3.4%
1891	5,135	−34.4%
1901	4,743	−7.6%
1911	3,321	−30.0%
1921	3,047	−8.3%
1931	2,708	−11.1%
1941	2,605	−3.8%

Year	Pop.	±%
1951	2,355	−9.6%
1956	2,597	+10.3%
1961	2,548	−1.9%
1966	2,474	−2.9%
1971	2,522	+1.9%
1976	2,625	+4.1%
1981	2,661	+1.4%
1986	2,714	+2.0%

Year	Pop.	±%
1991	3,118	+14.9%
1996	3,549	+13.8%
2001	3,769	+6.2%
2006	4,070	+8.0%
2011	4,150	+2.0%
2016	4,297	+3.5%
2021	4,538	+5.6%

Source: Statistics Canada

Mother tongue (2021 census):

- English as first language: 96.0%
- French as first language: 0.9%
- English and French as first language: 0.6%
- Other as first language: 1.9%

== Industry ==
Shipman’s Flour and Sawmill was constructed in 1851 and bought by William Fraser Chisholm in 1857, and known as Chisholm's Mills since.

== See also ==
- List of townships in Ontario
