= C. F. Hamilton =

Canadian intelligence officer and journalist

Colonel Charles Frederick Hamilton (1869–1933) was a Canadian intelligence officer and newspaper journalist.

Hamilton was born in Roslin, Ontario, in 1869, and later graduated from Queen's University

As a journalist, Hamilton first worked for The Toronto World, and from 1899 to 1902, at the Toronto Globe, where he covered the Boer War and "scooped" coverage of the Battle of Paardeberg. He later worked at the Toronto News.

He co-authored a biography of George Monro Grant, Principal Grant, in 1904.

During World War I, Hamilton served as a deputy chief censor, where he focused largely on cablegrams and radio traffic.

Following the war, in 1919, he returned to the Royal North-West Mounted Police, where he was made intelligence liaison, and became the Royal Canadian Mounted Police's first intelligence officer. There he penned influential reports on naval policy and voiced concern about a military threat from Japan in the 1920s. He served in that capacity at the RCMP until his death in 1933.
