= Weekend (magazine) =

Canadian magazine and newspaper supplement

- Editor: John Macfarlane (1976–1979)
- Frequency: Weekly
- Founded: 1951
- Final issue: 1979
- Company: Montreal Star, FP Publications
- Country: Canada
- Based in: Montreal
- Language: English

Weekend was a long-running Canadian magazine and newspaper supplement. The Montreal Standard was founded in 1905 as a weekly newspaper and was purchased by the Montreal Star in 1925. In 1951 the Standard was relaunched in magazine format as Weekend Picture Magazine serving as a newspaper supplement for the Montreal Star and eight other local newspapers across Canada. Eventually shortening its name to Weekend, the magazine, printed using the rotogravure process, included features writing, cultural and entertainment reporting, cartoons by Doug Wright, colour advertising and photographs and recipes among other items. The magazine began with a circulation of 900,000 and peaked in the 1960s when it was carried in 41 newspapers and had a circulation of 2.5 million, making it the largest circulation magazine in Canada. In 1959 a French-language edition, Perspectives, was launched.

In the mid-1960s the Southam newspaper chain launched its own newspaper supplement, The Canadian, which replaced Weekend in Southam's newspapers and competed with Weekend for advertising, talent and readers. In addition, the introduction of colour television into Canada in the late 1960s also hurt both magazines. In 1969, Weekend and The Canadian merged their marketing, advertising, and printing departments in order to cut costs but remained editorial competitors.

Frank Lowe, who was the magazine's editor in the early 1970s, had a pet project he called "The Vanishing Canada". The project consisted of publishing stories and photos about disappearing ways of life, of which two were the cover stories "Fishing the Great Lakes: a dying business" (February 5, 1972) and "Last Winter of a Farming Man" (April 1, 1972); both featured text and photos by journalist Peter H. Martyn.

John Macfarlane became editor in 1976 and eliminated staff writers, using freelance writers and editors instead, allowing him to redirect cost savings to the magazine's travel budget allowing the magazine to adopt an international focus, for example sending Adrienne Clarkson to China to write a feature on the thirtieth anniversary of the Chinese Communist Revolution and author Barry Callaghan to Africa to write a piece on Canadian missionaries. Groundbreaking pieces included "Gay in the '70s", an article exploring an issue that had usually been ignored by Canadian media and featuring a picture of prominent gay Canadians. The Canadian responded by emphasizing a national editorial focus.

In 1977, the magazine's editorial offices moved to Toronto, Ontario. In 1979, with both publications losing readers and ad revenue being lost to television, Weekend merged with its rival to become Canadian Weekend which was renamed Today in March 1980, before ceasing publication in 1982.

== See also ==
- The Star Weekly – a similar publication based in Toronto.
