= Partridge Lake (Lennox and Addington County) =

Lake in Lennox and Addington County, Ontario, Canada

- Location in southern Ontario
- Location: Addington Highlands, Lennox and Addington County, Ontario
- Coordinates: 44°49′21″N 77°19′26″W
- Part of: Great Lakes Basin
- Primary inflows: Partridge Creek
- Primary outflows: Partridge Creek
- Basin countries: Canada
- Max. length: 0.8 km (0.50 mi)
- Max. width: 0.5 km (0.31 mi)
- Surface elevation: 288 m (945 ft)

Partridge Lake is a lake in the Great Lakes Basin in Addington Highlands, Lennox and Addington County, Ontario, Canada.

The lake is about 0.8 kilometres (0.5 mi) long and 0.5 kilometres (0.3 mi) wide and lies at an elevation of 288 metres (945 ft), about 11 kilometres (6.8 mi) west southwest of the community of Cloyne on Ontario Highway 41 and just 1 kilometre (0.6 mi) southwest of the western tip of Skootamatta Lake. The primary inflow is Partridge Creek at the southwest. There are also two unnamed creek secondary inflows at the north and east. Partridge Creek is also the primary outflow at the southeast of the lake. The creek flows via the Skootamatta River and Moira River to the Bay of Quinte on Lake Ontario at Belleville.

== See also ==
- List of lakes in Ontario
