= Rainy Creek (Lennox and Addington County) =

- Location of the mouth of Rainy Creek in southern Ontario

Location
- Country: Canada
- Province: Ontario
- Region: Eastern Ontario
- County: Lennox and Addington
- Municipality: Addington Highlands

Physical characteristics
- Source: Unnamed marsh
  - coordinates: 44°53′20″N 77°23′34″W
  - elevation: 349 m (1,145 ft)
- Mouth: Skootamatta River
  - coordinates: 44°54′07″N 77°17′24″W
  - elevation: 315 m (1,033 ft)
- Length: 9.5 km (5.9 mi)

Basin features
- River system: Great Lakes Basin

Rainy Creek is a creek in the Moira River and Lake Ontario drainage basins in Addington Highlands, Lennox and Addington County, Ontario, Canada.

== Course ==
Rainy Creek begins in an unnamed marsh at an elevation of 349 metres (1,145 ft), 1.2 kilometres (0.7 mi) north of Grimsthorpe Lake on the sister tributary of the Skootamatta River, Partridge Creek. It flows south before turning east for the remainder of its course.The creek reaches Rainy Lake at an elevation of 325 metres (1,066 ft), and enters Bon Echo Provincial Park. The creek reaches its mouth at the Skootamatta River at an elevation of 315 metres (1,033 ft), between Joeperry Lake and Pearson Lake and about 12.5 kilometres (7.8 mi) northwest of the community of Cloyne.

== See also ==
- List of rivers of Ontario
