= Norway Lake (Addington Highlands) =

Lake in Addington Highlands, Ontario, Canada

- Location within Ontario
- Location: Addington Highlands, Lennox and Addington County, Ontario
- Coordinates: 44°54′45″N 77°19′47″W
- Primary outflows: Unnamed creek
- Basin countries: Canada
- Max. length: 0.6 km (0.37 mi)
- Max. width: 0.4 km (0.25 mi)
- Surface elevation: 340 m (1,120 ft)

Norway Lake is a lake in the Moira River and Lake Ontario drainage basins in Addington Highlands, Lennox and Addington County, Ontario, Canada.

The lake is about 0.6 kilometres (0.4 mi) long and 0.4 kilometres (0.2 mi) wide and lies at an elevation of 340 metres (1,115 ft) about 17 kilometres (11 mi) east of the community of Gunter and 15.5 kilometres (10 mi) northwest of the community of Cloyne. The primary outflow, at the southwest, is an unnamed creek to Rainy Lake, whose waters flow via Rainy Creek, Partridge Creek, the Skootamatta River and the Moira River into the Bay of Quinte on Lake Ontario at Belleville.

== See also ==
- List of lakes in Ontario
