= Killer Lake (Ontario) =

Lake in Ontario, Canada

- Location within Ontario
- Location: Addington Highlands, Lennox and Addington County, Ontario
- Coordinates: 44°53′04″N 77°19′42″W
- Primary inflows: Killer Creek
- Primary outflows: Killer Creek
- Basin countries: Canada
- Max. length: 0.9 km (0.56 mi)
- Max. width: 0.5 km (0.31 mi)
- Surface elevation: 328 m (1,076 ft)

Killer Lake is a lake in the Moira River and Lake Ontario drainage basins in Addington Highlands, Lennox and Addington County, Ontario, Canada.

The lake is about 0.9 kilometres (0.6 mi) long and 0.5 kilometres (0.3 mi) wide and lies at an elevation of 328 metres (1,076 ft) about 17 kilometres (11 mi) east of the community of Gunter and 13 kilometres (8 mi) northwest of the community of Cloyne. The primary inflow is Killer Creek at the northeast, and there is a secondary unnamed creek inflow at the northwest. The primary outflow, at the southeast, is also Killer Creek, whose waters flow via the Skootamatta River and the Moira River into the Bay of Quinte on Lake Ontario at Belleville.

== See also ==
- List of lakes in Ontario
