= Deerock Lake =

Lake in Ontario, Canada

- Location within Ontario
- Location: Tweed, Hastings County and Addington Highlands, Lennox and Addington County, Ontario
- Coordinates: 44°44′04″N 77°16′17″W
- Primary inflows: Partridge Creek
- Primary outflows: Partridge Creek
- Basin countries: Canada
- Max. length: 6.1 km (3.8 mi)
- Max. width: 1.3 km (0.81 mi)
- Surface area: 4.1 km^{2} (1.6 sq mi)
- Shore length^{1}: 23 km (14 mi)
- Surface elevation: 259 m (850 ft)
- Frozen: Frozen in winter
- ^{1} Shore length is not a well-defined measure.

Deerock Lake is a lake in the Moira River in Tweed, Hastings County and Addington Highlands, Lennox and Addington County in Ontario, Canada.

The lake is about 6.1 kilometres (3.8 mi) long and 1.3 kilometres (0.8 mi) wide and lies at an elevation of 259 metres (850 ft) about 5 kilometres (3.1 mi) west of the community of Northbrook on Ontario Highway 41 and about 5 kilometres (3.1 mi) north of the village of Flinton. Only the southwest tip of the lake lies in Tweed, Hastings County. The small Deerock Conservation Area operated by Quinte Conservation at the southeast of the lake and at the end of Deer Rock Lake Road, provides public access to the lake, and includes parking ($10/day) and a boat launch.

The primary inflow is Partridge Creek at the northwest. There are also eight unnamed creek secondary inflows at the west, northwest, three at north including one from Twin Lakes, and three at the south, including one from Denis Lake. Partridge Creek is also the primary outflow at the east end of the lake, controlled by the Deerock Dam. The creek flows via the Skootamatta River and Moira River into the Bay of Quinte on Lake Ontario at Belleville.

Camping areas have been limited as of 2015 and 'at large' camping outside of designated spots forbidden. As a result, availability is not assured as spots are on a first come basis especially during peak season.

== See also ==
- List of lakes in Ontario
