= Little Skootamatta Creek =

- Location of the mouth of Little Skootamatta Creek in southern Ontario
- Etymology: From the Ojibwa "burnt shoreline"

Location
- Country: Canada
- Province: Ontario
- Regions: Central Ontario; Eastern Ontario
- Counties: Hastings; Lennox and Addington

Physical characteristics
- Source: Unnamed lake
  - location: Addington Highlands, Lennox and Addington County
  - coordinates: 44°40′43″N 77°07′44″W
  - elevation: 224 m (735 ft)
- Mouth: Skootamatta River
  - location: Tweed, Hastings County
  - coordinates: 44°34′28″N 77°14′26″W
  - elevation: 179 m (587 ft)
- Length: 22 km (14 mi)

Basin features
- River system: Great Lakes Basin

Little Skootamatta Creek is a creek in the Moira River and Lake Ontario drainage basins in Hastings and Lennox and Addington Counties in Ontario, Canada. The river's name is thought to come from Ojibwa words meaning "burnt shoreline".

== Course ==
The creek begins at an unnamed lake about 3.5 kilometres (2.2 mi) northeast of the community of Kaladar in Addington Highlands, Lennox and Addington County at an elevation of 224 metres (735 ft). It flows southwest and flows under Ontario Highway 41, passing through several unnamed lakes and taking in several unnamed tributaries, including one from the right from Jacksons Lake. From that point, Ontario Highway 7 runs parallel to the creek. The creek continues southwest, is crossed by a Hydro One transmission line, and passes into Tweed, Hastings County. It reaches its mouth at the Skootamatta River, at an elevation of 179 metres (587 ft), about 7 kilometres (4 mi) east of the community of Actinolite. The Skootamatta River flows via the Moira River into the Bay of Quinte on Lake Ontario at the location of Belleville.

== See also ==
- List of rivers of Ontario
