= Pearson Lake (Lennox and Addington County) =

Lake in Lennox and Addington County, Ontario, Canada

- Location within Ontario
- Location: Addington Highlands, Lennox and Addington County, Ontario
- Coordinates: 44°54′00″N 77°16′31″W
- Primary inflows: Skootamatta River
- Primary outflows: Skootamatta River
- Basin countries: Canada
- Max. length: 2.4 km (1.5 mi)
- Max. width: 0.4 km (0.25 mi)
- Surface elevation: 315 m (1,033 ft)

Pearson Lake is a lake in the Moira River and Lake Ontario drainage basins in Addington Highlands, Lennox and Addington County, Ontario, Canada. The lake is about 10 kilometres (6 mi) northwest of the community of Cloyne and is within Bon Echo Provincial Park.

Pearson Lake is about 2.4 kilometres (1.5 mi) long and 0.4 kilometres (0.2 mi) wide and lies at an elevation of 315 metres (1,033 ft). The primary inflow is the Skootamatta River from Joeperry Lake at the northwest; a marsh at the north of the lake forms a second connection from Joeperry Lake. The Skootamatta River is also the primary outflow, at the southeast, towards Skootamatta Lake. The Skootamatta River flows via the Moira River into the Bay of Quinte on Lake Ontario at Belleville.

== See also ==
- List of lakes in Ontario
