= Jacksons Lake =

Lake in Ontario, Canada

- Location within Ontario
- Location: Addington Highlands, Lennox and Addington County, Ontario
- Coordinates: 44°38′11″N 77°11′15″W
- Primary inflows: Unnamed creek
- Primary outflows: Unnamed creek
- Basin countries: Canada
- Max. length: 380 metres (1,247 ft)
- Max. width: 110 metres (361 ft)
- Surface elevation: 214 m (702 ft)

Jacksons Lake is a small lake in the Moira River and Lake Ontario drainage basins in Addington Highlands, Lennox and Addington County, Ontario, Canada.

The lake is about 380 metres (1,247 ft) long and 110 metres (361 ft) wide and lies at an elevation of 214 metres (702 ft) about 5.5 kilometres (3 mi) west of the community of Kaladar and 2 kilometres (1 mi) north of Ontario Highway 7. The primary inflow at the northwest and outflow at the southeast is an unnamed creek that is a right tributary of Little Skootamatta Creek. That creek flows via the Skootamatta River and Moira River into the Bay of Quinte on Lake Ontario at Belleville.

== See also ==
- List of lakes in Ontario
