= Rainy Lake (Moira drainage basin) =

Lake in Lennox and Addington County, Ontario, Canada

- Location within Ontario Location within Canada
- Location: Addington Highlands, Lennox and Addington County, Ontario
- Coordinates: 44°53′56″N 77°19′47″W
- Primary inflows: Rainy Creek
- Primary outflows: Rainy Creek
- Basin countries: Canada
- Max. length: 1.6 km (0.99 mi)
- Max. width: 0.4 km (0.25 mi)
- Surface elevation: 325 m (1,066 ft)

Rainy Lake is a lake in the Moira River and Lake Ontario drainage basins in Addington Highlands, Lennox and Addington County, Ontario, Canada.

The lake is about 1.6 kilometres (1.0 mi) long and 0.4 kilometres (0.2 mi) wide and lies at an elevation of 325 metres (1,066 ft) about 16 kilometres (10 mi) east of the community of Gunter and 14 kilometres (9 mi) northwest of the community of Cloyne. The primary inflow, at the west, is Rainy Creek. There are two unnamed creek secondary inflows, both on the north of the lake, one of which comes from Norway Lake. The primary outflow, at the east, is also Rainy Creek, whose waters flow via the Skootamatta River and the Moira River into the Bay of Quinte on Lake Ontario at Belleville.

== See also ==
- List of lakes in Ontario
