= Grimsthorpe Lake =

Lake in Ontario, Canada

- Location within Ontario
- Location: Tweed, Hastings County and Addington Highlands, Lennox and Addington County, Ontario
- Coordinates: 44°52′26″N 77°23′40″W
- Primary inflows: Partridge Creek
- Primary outflows: Partridge Creek
- Basin countries: Canada
- Max. length: 1.9 km (1.2 mi)
- Max. width: 0.9 km (0.56 mi)
- Surface elevation: 319 m (1,047 ft)

Grimsthorpe Lake is a lake in the Moira River and Lake Ontario drainage basins that straddles the border between Tweed, Hastings County and Addington Highlands, Lennox and Addington County in Ontario, Canada.

The lake is about 1.9 kilometres (1.2 mi) long and 0.9 kilometres (0.6 mi) wide and lies at an elevation of 319 metres (1,047 ft) about 11 kilometres (7 mi) east of the community of Gunter and 17 kilometres (11 mi) northwest of the community of Cloyne. The primary inflow is Partridge Creek from the northwest, and there are three unnamed creek secondary inflows at the southwest, north and south. Partridge Creek is also the primary outflow at the southeast. It flows via the Skootamatta River and Moira River into the Bay of Quinte on Lake Ontario at Belleville.

== See also ==
- List of lakes in Ontario
