= Rainy (disambiguation) =

Rainy refers to an abundance of rain.

Rainy may also refer to:

- Rainy season, a specific time of year with when most of a region's average annual rainfall
- Rainy (singer), birth name Ruca Sharon Pike, an Australian-Japanese singer

== Places ==
- Rainy Butte, a summit in North Dakota
- Rainy Lake (disambiguation)
- Rainy River (disambiguation)

== See also ==
- Rainy Day (disambiguation)
