= Flinton =

Flinton may refer to:

- Flinton, East Riding of Yorkshire, United Kingdom
- Flinton, Ontario, Canada
- Flinton, Queensland, Australia
- Flinton Creek, in Ontario, Canada
- Ben Flinton, one of the artists for the DC Comics publication All-American Comics
- Miss Flinton, a character in Wives Never Know
