= List of lakes of Ontario: J =

This is a list of lakes of Ontario beginning with the letter J.

== Ja ==
- Jaab Lake
- Jabez Lake
- Jac Saga Lake
- Jack Lake (Nipissing District)
- Jack Lake (Jill Lake, Kenora District)
- Jack Lake (Parry Sound District)
- Jack Lake (Rainy River District)
- Jack Lake (Peterborough County)
- Jack Lake (Carnegie Township, Cochrane District)
- Jack Lake (Thunder Bay District)
- Jack Lake (Malachi Township, Kenora District)
- Jack Lake (Sudbury District)
- Jack Lake (Jack Creek, Cochrane District)
- Jack Lake (Blount Township, Cochrane District)
- Jack's Lake
- Jackdaw Lake
- Jackfish Hole
- Jackfish Lake (Loonhaunt River, Rainy River District)
- Jackfish Lake (Kashabowie Lake, Thunder Bay District)
- Jackfish Lake (Algoma District)
- Jackfish Lake (Syine Township, Thunder Bay District)
- Jackfish Lake (Hall Lake, Kenora District)
- Jackfish Lake (Satterly Township, Kenora District)
- Jackfish Lake (Atikokan)
- Jackfish Lake (Wapawukaw Lake, Kenora District)
- Jackfish Lake (Red Lake)
- Jackfish Lake (Maple Creek, Thunder Bay District)
- Jackfish Lake (Perrault Lake, Kenora District)
- Jackfish Lake (White Otter Lake, Kenora District)
- Jackfish Lake (Sioux Lookout)
- Jackfish Pond
- Jackinnes Lake
- Jacknife Lake
- Jackpine Lake (Nipissing District)
- Jackpine Lake (Kenora District)
- Jackpine Lake (Cochrane District)
- Jackpine Lake (Thunder Bay District)
- Jackpine Lake (Algoma District)
- Jackpot Lake
- Jacks Lake (Simcoe County)
- Jacks Lake (Parry Sound District)
- Jacks Lake (Barron Township, Nipissing District)
- Jacks Lake (South Algonquin)
- Jacks Lake (Renfrew County)
- Jacks Lake (Thunder Bay District)
- Jacks Lake (Kenora District)
- Jackson Lake (Cochrane Township, Sudbury District)
- Jackson Lake (Beebe Township, Algoma District)
- Jackson Lake (Dickson Township, Nipissing District)
- Jackson Lake (Thunder Bay District)
- Jackson Lake (Papineau-Cameron
- Jackson Lake (Abotossaway Township, Algoma District)
- Jackson Lake (Kenora District)
- Jackson Lake (Timiskaming District)
- Jackson Lake (Muskoka District)
- Jackson Lake (Street Township, Sudbury District)
- Jackson's Lake
- Jacksons Lake
- Jacob Lake (Cochrane District)
- Jacob Lake (Thunder Bay District)
- Jacobs Lake
- Jacobson Lake
- Jacobus Lake
- Jadakin Lake
- Jade Lake
- Jadel Lake
- Jaeger Lake
- Jag Lake
- Jagged Lake
- Jake Lake (Thunder Bay District)
- Jake Lake (Kenora District)
- Jake Lake (Nipissing District)
- Jake Lake (Sudbury District)
- Jake's Lake
- Jam Lake (Cochrane District)
- Jam Lake (Thunder Bay District)
- James Lake (Olrig Township, Nipissing District)
- James Lake (Bretz Lake, Kenora District)
- James Lake (Frontenac County)
- James Lake (Temagami)
- James Lake (Hastings County)
- James Lake (Shoal Lake, Kenora District)
- James Lake (Umbach Township, Kenora District)
- Jamieson Lake (Hastings County)
- Jamieson Lake (Nipissing District)
- Jamieson Lake (Renfrew County)
- Jamtama Lake
- Janakka Lake
- Jane Lake
- Jane Spurgeon Lake
- Janes Lake
- Janet Lake (Thunder Bay District)
- Janet Lake (Cochrane District)
- Jannack Lake
- Janus Lake
- Japan Lake
- Jar Lake
- Jardine Lake
- Jarrow Lake
- Jarvey Lake
- Jarvis Lake (Kenora District)
- Jarvis Lake (Thunder Bay District)
- Jarvis Lake (Algoma District)
- Jarvis Lake (Hastings County)
- Jarvis Lake (Nipissing District)
- Jason Lake
- Jasper Lake (Rainy River District)
- Jasper Lake (Sudbury District)
- Jasper Lake (Kenora District)
- Jaw Lake (Algoma District)
- Jaw Lake (Thunder Bay District)
- Jawbone Lake (Raynar Township, Cochrane District)
- Jawbone Lake (Thorning Township, Cochrane District)
- Jawbone Lake (Timiskaming District)
- Jay Lake (Thunder Bay District)
- Jay Lake (Beaudry Township, Algoma District)
- Jay Lake (Kenora District)
- Jay Lake (Nipissing District)
- Jay Lake (Larkin Township, Algoma District)
- Jaybee Lake

== Jea–Jem ==
- Lake Jean
- Jean Lake (Halcrow Township, Sudbury District)
- Jean Lake (Algoma District)
- Jean Lake (Rainy River District)
- Jean Lake (Kenora District)
- Jean Lake (Browning Township, Sudbury District)
- Jean Lake (Nipissing District)
- Jean Lake (Cochrane District)
- Jean Lake (Haliburton County)
- Jean Lake (Timiskaming District)
- Jeanette Lake (Kenora District)
- Jeanette Lake (Cochrane District)
- Jeanne Lake
- Jeannette Lake
- Jeannie Lake (Cochrane District)
- Jeannie Lake (Haliburton County)
- Jeem Lake
- Jeep Lake (Thunder Bay District)
- Jeep Lake (Algoma District)
- Jeepi Lake
- Jeff Lake (Grzela Township, Algoma District)
- Jeff Lake (Thunder Bay District)
- Jeff Lake (Alarie Township, Algoma District)
- Jeff Lake (Sudbury District)
- Jeff Lake (Rainy River District)
- Jeffers Lake (Kenora District)
- Jeffers Lake (Renfrew County)
- Jefferson Lake (Kenora District)
- Jefferson Lake (Cochrane District)
- Jefferson Lake (Sudbury District)
- Jeffery Lake (Parry Sound District)
- Jeffrey Lake (Hastings County)
- Jeffrey Lake (Renfrew County)
- Jeffreys Lake (Brudenell, Lyndoch and Raglan)
- Jeffreys Lake (Whitewater Region)
- Jeffries Lake
- Jeffs Lake
- Jehann Lake
- J.E.H. MacDonald Lake
- Jellybean Lake
- Jelso Lake
- Jemar Lake
- Jembi Lake
- Jemima Lake

== Jen–Jew ==
- Jen Lake (Sudbury District)
- Jen Lake (Cochrane District)
- Jenkins Lake (Renfrew County)
- Jenkins Lake (Thunder Bay District)
- Jenkins Lake (Nipissing District)
- Jenkins Lake (Muskoka District)
- Jenkins Lake (Manitoulin District)
- Jenks Lake
- Jenner Lake
- Jennette Lake
- Jennie Lake (Kenora District)
- Jennie Lake (Sudbury District)
- Jennings Lake (Renfrew County)
- Jennings Lake (Nipissing District)
- Jeno Lake
- Jenvey Lake
- Jepson Lake
- Jeri Lake
- Jerita Lake
- Jerome Lake
- Jerry Lake (Muskoka District)
- Jerry Lake (Parry Sound District)
- Jerry Lake (Timiskaming District)
- Jerry Lake (Renfrew County)
- Jerry Lake (Sudbury District)
- Jerry's Lake
- Jervis Bay Lake
- Jess Lake (Greater Sudbury)
- Jess Lake (Algoma District)
- Jess Lake (Sudbury District)
- Jesse James Lake
- Jesse Lake
- Jessica Lake
- Jessie Lake (Nipissing District)
- Jessie Lake (Kenora District)
- Jessie Lake (Purdom Township, Thunder Bay District)
- Jessie Lake (Sturgeon Lake, Thunder Bay District)
- Jessiman Lake
- Jessop Lake
- Jessups Lake
- Jester Lake
- Jet Lake
- Jethel Lake
- Jette Lake
- Jevins Lake
- Jewel Lake (Nipissing District)
- Jewel Lake (Kenora District)
- Jewell Lake (Nipissing District)
- Jewell Lake (Thunder Bay District)
- Jewett Lake

== Ji ==
- Jig Lake (Thunder Bay District)
- Jig Lake (Algoma District)
- Jigger Lake
- Jiggy Lake
- Jijime Lake
- Jill Lake (Muskoka District)
- Jill Lake (Kenora District)
- Jim Christ Lake
- Jim Edwards Lake
- Jim Lake (Jim Creek, Thunder Bay District)
- Jim Lake (Fox Creek, Thunder Bay District)
- Jim Lake (Rainy River District)
- Jim Lake (Black Sturgeon Lake, Thunder Bay District)
- Jim Lake (Mars Lake, Kenora District)
- Jim Lake (Octopus Lake, Kenora District)
- Jimbo Lake
- Jimmie Lake (Hastings County)
- Jimmie Lake (Nipissing District)
- Jimmie Lake (Thunder Bay District)
- Jimmy Kash Lake
- Jimmy Lake (Casson Township, Algoma District)
- Jimmy Lake (Beaudry Township, Algoma District)
- Jimmy Lake (Kenora District)
- Jimmy Lake (Sudbury District)
- Jims Lake
- Jinks Lake
- Jinx Lake (Thunder Bay District)
- Jinx Lake (Parry Sound District)
- Jinx Lake (Cochrane District)
- Jiu Jitsu Lake

== Joa–Jol ==
- Joachim Lake
- Joan Lake
- Joanne Lake
- Job Lake
- Jobammageeshig Lake
- Jobes Lake
- Jobrin Lake
- Jocko Lake (Barron Township, Nipissing District)
- Jocko Lake (Hastings County)
- Jocko Lake (Madawaska Valley)
- Jocko Lake (Osborne Township, Nipissing District)
- Jocko Lake (Greater Madawaska)
- Joco Lake
- Jodrell Lake
- Joe Lake (Nipissing District)
- Joe Lake (Cochrane District)
- Joe Lake (Sudbury District)
- Joe Lake (Malachi Township, Kenora District)
- Joe Lake (Nickle Township, Thunder Bay District)
- Joe Lake (Lount Lake, Kenora District)
- Joe Lake (Weikwabinonaw River, Thunder Bay District)
- Joe Louis Lake
- Joe's Lake
- Joeboy Lake
- Joeperry Lake
- Joes Lake (Renfrew County)
- Joes Lake (Lanark County)
- Joffre Lake
- Jog Lake (Patenaude Township, Sudbury District)
- Jog Lake (Cochrane District)
- Jog Lake (Algoma District)
- Jog Lake (Whigham Township, Sudbury District)
- John Bill Lake
- John Lake (Sudbury District)
- John Lake (Algoma District)
- John Lake (Kenora District)
- John Lake (Parry Sound District)
- John Lake (Hastings County)
- John Lake (Thunder Bay District)
- John Lake (Nipissing District)
- Johnar Lake
- Johnline Lake
- Johnnie Lake
- Johnnies Lake
- Johnny Lake (Renfrew County)
- Johnny Lake (Algoma District)
- Johnny Lake (Thunder Bay District)
- Johns Lake (Kenora District)
- Johns Lake (Parry Sound District)
- Johns Lake (Killaloe, Hagarty and Richards)
- Johns Lake (North Algona Wilberforce)
- Johnson Lake (Owl Creek, Kenora District)
- Johnson Lake (Thunder Bay District)
- Johnson Lake (Frontenac County)
- Johnson Lake (Sudbury District)
- Johnson Lake (Hastings County)
- Johnson Lake (Pennefather Township, Algoma District)
- Johnson Lake (Cochrane District)
- Johnson Lake (Larkin Township, Algoma District)
- Johnson Lake (Parry Sound District)
- Johnson Lake (Timiskaming District)
- Johnson Lake (Mulcahy Township, Kenora District)
- Johnson Lake (Haliburton County)
- Johnson's Lake
- Johnsons Lake
- Johnspine Lake
- Johnston Lake (Stratton Township, Nipissing District)
- Johnston Lake (Kawartha Lakes)
- Johnston Lake (Algoma District)
- Johnston Lake (Kenora District)
- Johnston Lake (Calvin)
- Johnston Lake (Parry Sound District)
- Johnstons Lake
- Joint Lake
- Jojo Lake
- Joki Lake
- Joliat Lake
- Jolly Lake (Nipissing District)
- Jolly Lake (Thunder Bay District)

== Jon–Joy ==
- Jonas Lake
- Jonas (Bell) Lake
- Jones Lake (Greater Sudbury)
- Jones Lake (Algoma District)
- Jones Lake (Kenora District)
- Jones Lake (Timiskaming District)
- Jones Lake (Sudbury District)
- Jones Lake (Thunder Bay District)
- Joneston Lake
- Jonlow Lake
- Jonson Lake
- Jonsons Lake
- Jordain Lake
- Jordan Lake (Hastings County)
- Jordan Lake (Haliburton County)
- Jordan Lake (Timiskaming District)
- Jordan Lake (Cochrane District)
- Jordan's Lake
- Jorgens Lake
- Jorgenson Lake
- Jorick Lake
- Jory Lake
- Joselin Lake (Cochrane District)
- Joselin Lake (Algoma District)
- Lake Joseph
- Joseph Lake (Sudbury District)
- Joseph Lake (Algoma District)
- Joseph Lake (Cochrane District)
- Joseph Lake (Thunder Bay District)
- Joseph's Lake
- Josephine Lake (Thunder Bay District)
- Josephine Lake (Manitoulin District)
- Josephine Lake (Algoma District)
- Josephine Lake (Sudbury District)
- Josh Lake
- Josie Lake
- Josies Lake
- Jost Lake
- Jostle Lake
- Joto Lake
- Jowett Lake
- Jowsey Lake
- Joy Lake
- Joyce Lake (Hatmaker Lake, Kenora District)
- Joyce Lake (Joyce River, Kenora District)
- Joyce Lake (Timiskaming District)
- Joyce Lake (Coyle Township, Kenora District)
- Joyce Lake (Thunder Bay District)
- Joyce Lake (Rainy River District)
- Joyces Lake

== Ju ==
- Juan Lake
- Jubilee Lake (Nipissing District)
- Jubilee Lake (Algoma District)
- Jubilee Lake (Kenora District)
- Juby Lake
- Judge Lake
- Judy Lake
- Jules Lake
- Julia Lake
- Julian Lake (Peterborough County)
- Julian Lake (Sudbury District)
- Julius Lake
- July Lake (Kenora District)
- July Lake (Thunder Bay District)
- July Lake (Rainy River District)
- Jumbo Lake (Sudbury District)
- Jumbo Lake (Thunder Bay District)
- Jump Lake (Rainy River District)
- Jump Lake (Timiskaming District)
- Jumpfire Lake
- Jumping Cariboo Lake
- Jumping Lake
- Jumping Moose Lake
- Jumpingcat Lake
- Junco Lake (Nipissing District)
- Junco Lake (Sudbury District)
- Junction Lake (Algoma District)
- Junction Lake (Cochrane District)
- Junction Lake (Timiskaming District)
- June Lake (Rainy River District)
- June Lake (Cochrane District)
- June Lake (Kenora District)
- June Lake (Algoma District)
- Juneau Lake
- Jungfrau Lake
- Jungle Lake
- Junior Lake
- Juniper Lake (Kenora District)
- Juniper Lake (Frontenac County)
- Juniper Lake (Parry Sound District)
- Juniper Lake (Kenora District)
- Jupiter Lake
- Justice Lake
- Justin Lake
- Jutten Lake
- Jutzi Lake
