= Rainy Lake (Snake Creek drainage basin) =

Lake in Lennox and Addington County, Ontario, Canada

- Location within Ontario Location within Canada
- Location: Addington Highlands, Lennox and Addington County, Ontario
- Coordinates: 45°09′59″N 77°19′47″W
- Primary outflows: Unnamed creek
- Basin countries: Canada
- Max. length: 350 metres (1,148 ft)
- Max. width: 100 metres (328 ft)
- Surface elevation: 416 m (1,365 ft)

Rainy Lake is a small lake in the Ottawa River and St. Lawrence River drainage basins in Addington Highlands, Lennox and Addington County, Ontario, Canada.

The lake is about 350 metres (1,148 ft) long and 100 metres (328 ft) wide and lies at an elevation of 416 metres (1,365 ft) about 5 kilometres (3.1 mi) northwest of the community of Denbigh and 0.6 kilometres (0.4 mi) northeast of Ontario Highway 28. The primary outflow, at the northwest, is an unnamed creek to Northeast Lake, whose waters eventually flow via Snake Creek, the Madawaska River and the Ottawa River to the St. Lawrence River.

== See also ==
- List of lakes in Ontario
