= Elzevir Lake =

Lake in Ontario, Canada

- Location within Ontario
- Location: Tweed, Hastings County, Ontario
- Coordinates: 44°42′03″N 77°20′36″W
- Primary inflows: Elzevir Creek
- Primary outflows: Elzevir Creek
- Basin countries: Canada
- Max. length: 0.9 km (0.56 mi)
- Max. width: 0.3 km (0.19 mi)
- Surface elevation: 254 m (833 ft)

Elzevir Lake is a lake in the Moira River and Lake Ontario drainage basins in Tweed, Hastings County, Ontario, Canada.

The lake is about 0.9 kilometres (0.6 mi) long and 0.3 kilometres (0.2 mi) wide and lies at an elevation of 254 metres (833 ft) about 10 kilometres (6 mi) west of the community of Flinton. The primary inflow is Elzevir Creek from an unnamed lake at the northwest; it is also the primary outflow at the southeast to an unnamed lake. The creek flows via the Skootamatta River and Moira River into the Bay of Quinte on Lake Ontario at Belleville.

== See also ==
- List of lakes in Ontario
