= Addington County =

Former county in Ontario, Canada

Coordinates: 44°20′N 76°45′W

Addington County was a historic county in the Canadian province of Ontario which now forms part of Lennox and Addington County. It was named after Henry Addington, 1st Viscount Sidmouth.

Its territory is now distributed among the townships of Addington Highlands, Stone Mills, and Loyalist.

== Historical evolution ==
The county of Addington, situated within the Mecklenburg District, was originally created as an electoral district for the Legislative Assembly of Upper Canada in 1792 and its original limits were described as being:

bounded on the east by the westernmost line of the county of Frontenac, on the south by lake Ontario, to the westernmost boundary of the late township of Ernestown, and on the west by the easternmost boundary of the township of Fredericksburgh, running north thirty-one degrees west until it meets the Ottawa or Grand River, thence descending the said river until it meets the northwesternmost boundary of the said county of Frontenac, comprehending within the said county all the islands nearest to it, in the whole or greater part fronting the same.

Mecklenburg was renamed as the "Midland District" in 1792.

It was combined with Lennox County and Amherst Island in 1800 to become the incorporated counties of Lennox and Addington. The counties would regain their separate identities in 1845, but would continue to be united for electoral purposes. The newly surveyed township of Anglesea was added to Addington at that time. The township of Kaladar was also included, having been added to the incorporated counties in 1821.

At the beginning of 1850, Midland District was abolished, and the United Counties of Frontenac, Lennox and Addington replaced it for municipal and judicial purposes. In 1860, Lennox and Addington were formally amalgamated as the County of Lennox and Addington.

== Historical townships ==
- Abinger Township - The township is now part of Addington Highlands.
- Amherst Island Township - The township is now part of Loyalist.
- Anglesea Township - The township is now part of Addington Highlands.
- Ashby Township - The township is now part of Addington Highlands.
- Camden Township - The township is now part of Stone Mills.
- Denbigh Township - The township is now part of Addington Highlands.
- Effingham Township - The township is now part of Addington Highlands.
- Ernestown Township - The township is now part of Loyalist.
- Kaladar Township - The township is now part of Addington Highlands.
- Sheffield Township - The township is now part of Stone Mils.

== See also ==
- Census geographic units of Canada
- List of census divisions of Ontario
- List of townships in Ontario
