= Killer Creek (Ontario) =

- Location of the mouth of Killer Creek in southern Ontario

Location
- Country: Canada
- Province: Ontario
- Region: Eastern Ontario
- County: Lennox and Addington
- Municipality: Addington Highlands

Physical characteristics
- Source: Unnamed lake
  - coordinates: 44°53′18″N 77°18′59″W
  - elevation: 344 m (1,129 ft)
- Mouth: Skootamatta Lake
  - coordinates: 44°50′09″N 77°18′47″W
  - elevation: 289 m (948 ft)
- Length: 10.4 km (6.5 mi)

Basin features
- River system: Great Lakes Basin

Killer Creek is a creek in the Moira River and Lake Ontario drainage basins in Addington Highlands, Lennox and Addington County, Ontario, Canada.

== Course ==
Killer Creek begins at an unnamed lake at an elevation of 344 metres (1,129 ft) and flows southwest to Killer Lake at an elevation of 328 metres (1,076 ft). It then heads generally south to reach its mouth at the west end of Skootamatta Lake on the Skootamatta River at an elevation of 289 metres (948 ft). The Skootamatta River flows via the Moira River to the Bay of Quinte on Lake Ontario at Belleville.

== See also ==
- List of rivers of Ontario
