= Flinton Creek =

- Location of the mouth of Flinton Creek in southern Ontario

Location
- Country: Canada
- Province: Ontario
- Region: Central Ontario, Eastern Ontario
- Counties: Hastings; Lennox and Addington

Physical characteristics
- Source: Unnamed lake
  - location: Addington Highlands, Lennox and Addington County
  - coordinates: 44°42′19″N 77°07′12″W
  - elevation: 244 m (801 ft)
- Mouth: Skootamatta River
  - location: Tweed, Hastings County
  - coordinates: 44°36′33″N 77°14′20″W
  - elevation: 188 m (617 ft)

Basin features
- River system: Great Lakes Basin

Flinton Creek is a creek in the Moira River and Lake Ontario drainage basins in Hastings and Lennox and Addington Counties in Ontario, Canada.

== Course ==
Flinton Creek begins at an unnamed lake in Addington Highlands, Lennox and Addington County, about 2.8 kilometres (1.7 mi) west southwest of the community of Flinton Corners, at an elevation of 244 metres (801 ft). It travels west, passes under Ontario Highway 41, heads southwest to the east of the community of Flinton, and reaches its mouth at the Skootamatta River just over the border into Hastings County. The Skootamatta River flows via the Moira River into the Bay of Quinte on Lake Ontario at Belleville.
