= Upper Partridge Lake (Ontario) =

Lake in Ontario, Canada

- Location within Ontario
- Location: Tudor and Cashel, Hastings County
- Coordinates: 44°56′47″N 77°29′11″W
- Primary inflows: Partridge Creek from unnamed lake
- Primary outflows: Partridge Creek towards Grimsthorpe Lake
- Basin countries: Canada
- Max. length: 1.4 km (0.87 mi)
- Max. width: 0.9 km (0.56 mi)
- Surface elevation: 364 m (1,194 ft)

Upper Partridge Lake is a fresh water lake in the Lake Ontario drainage basin in the Cashel portion of the township of Tudor and Cashel, Hastings County, Ontario, Canada. It is about 3.7 kilometres (2.3 mi) southwest of the community of McCrae and just south of Weslemkoon Lake Road that leads to that community.

== Hydrology ==
Upper Partridge Lake is about 1.4 kilometres (0.9 mi) long and 0.9 kilometres (0.6 mi) wide and lies at an elevation of 364 metres (1,194 ft). The primary inflow is Partridge Creek from an unnamed lake at the north. The primary outflow is also Partridge Creek, south towards Grimsthorpe Lake, which eventually flows via the Skootamatta River and Moira River to the Bay of Quinte on Lake Ontario.
