= Billa Flint =

Canadian politician

The Honourable Billa Flint
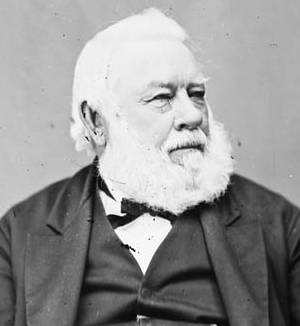

Canadian Senator from Ontario
- In office 1867–1894

Member of the Legislative Assembly of the Province of Canada
- In office 1850–1851, 1854–1857

Personal details
- Born: February 9, 1805 Elizabethtown, Upper Canada
- Died: June 15, 1894 (aged 89) Ottawa, Ontario, Canada
- Party: Liberal
- Spouse: Phoebe Sawyer Clement (1827)
- Occupation: Politician; businessman

Billa Flint (February 9, 1805 – June 15, 1894) was a businessman and political figure in Ontario.

He was a Liberal member of the Senate of Canada from 1867 until his death in 1894.

== Early life ==
Billa Flint was born on 9 February 1805 to Phoebe (Wells) Flint and a father of the same name, who worked in Brockville a merchant and hotelier. He father was a heavy drinker and opium user.

He was born in Elizabethtown (later Brockville) in Upper Canada and dropped out of school after six weeks to work for his father as a clerk.

== Family life ==
Billa Flint's son, J. J. B. Flint, 1872

Flint married Phoebe Sawyer Clement on 10 September 1827. They lived at 180 Coleman Street in Belleville.

The couple adopted John James Bleecker (born 1838) who became known as J. B. Flint, worked as lawyer, and was elected as the Mayor of Belleville, Ontario in 1872. He was dismissed as a Police Magistrate after 20 years service in 1907.

== Later life and career ==
Billa Flint and his wife Phoebe, 1880s

In 1829, unhappy with the sale of liquor at his father's hotel, he moved to Belleville where he opened a general store, before opening Ontario's first saw mill, creating wharfs, and warehouses. In the same year, he also founded a temperance society there, claiming it to be the first in Upper Canada.

In 1836, he was appointed magistrate and also became president of the Bellville Board of Police. He served as the Commissioner of the 1st Regiment of Hastings Cavalry, during the Rebellions of 1837–1838.

He was a trustee of the Wesleyan Methodist church and served as the superintendent of the Bridge Street Methodist Church Sunday School, Bellville Flint and fellow trustees originally lost a court case brought by Methodist Episcopals who sought to recover ownership of a chapel. Flint won on appeal in 1940.

He constructed flour, oat and barley mills in the 1850s, and owned furniture factory, a temperance hotel, and a general store in Troy. He also created a flour mill, a saw mill, and machine shops in Kaladar Township in Flint’s Mills.

He purchased mills at the town of York Mills, which he later renamed as Bancroft, after his mother-in-law Elizabeth Ann Bancroft.

Flint operated a steamship on the Moira river and invested in steamship companies that operated on Lake Ontario. In 1868, He advocated for improvements to the St. Lawrence River.

Economic factors, fires, and his advancing age caused Flint to sell his businesses and retire in 1883.

=== Political appointments ===
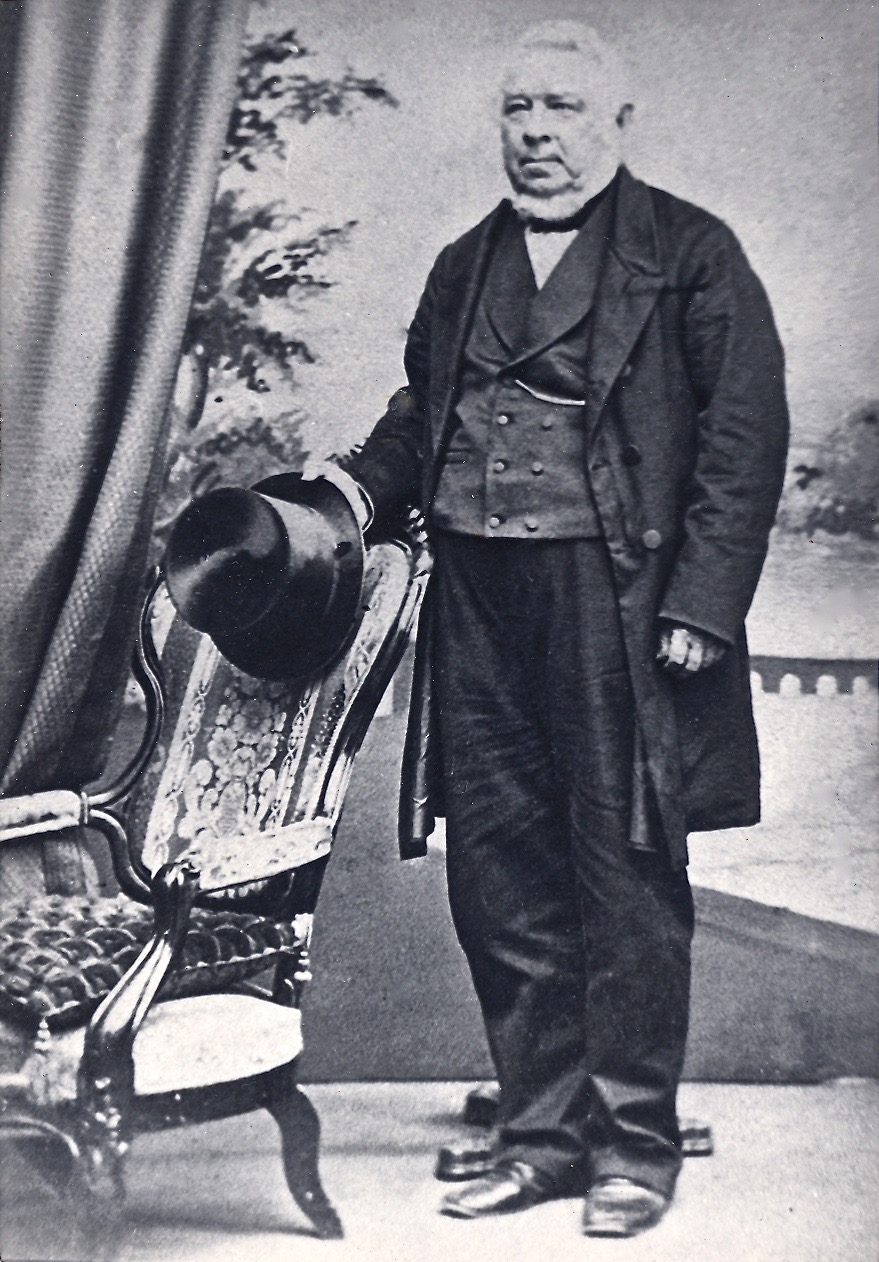
Undated photo of Billa Flint

Flint was elected to the Legislative Assembly of the Province of Canada in 1847 for Hastings and, in 1854, for Hastings South.

From 1858 to 1879, he was the Reeve of Elzevir Township.

In 1861, he lost an election to Sidney Smith to join the Legislative Council representing the Trent Division. He won the seat in 1863.

He was elected as the reeve and mayor of Belleville in 1866, and was the warden of Hastings County in 1873.

In 1865, Flint voted against confederation, due to his opposition of Separate schools. In 1867, he was appointed to the Senate of Canada, the first person in Hastings County to be appointed to the Senate. He was a Senator until his death in 1894.

== Writing ==
In 1869, Flint wrote a series of articles about the early days of Belleville published as Forty Years Ago in the Daily Intelligencer, the Globe and Mail, Montreal's Gazette and the Montreal Herald.

Subsequent historical articles written by Flint appeared in the Daily Intelligencer in 1872 and 1876.

== Death ==
He died at Ottawa in 1894, while serving as member of the Senate.
