= Denbigh, Ontario =

Coordinates: 45°08′20.4″N 77°17′27.3″W

Denbigh
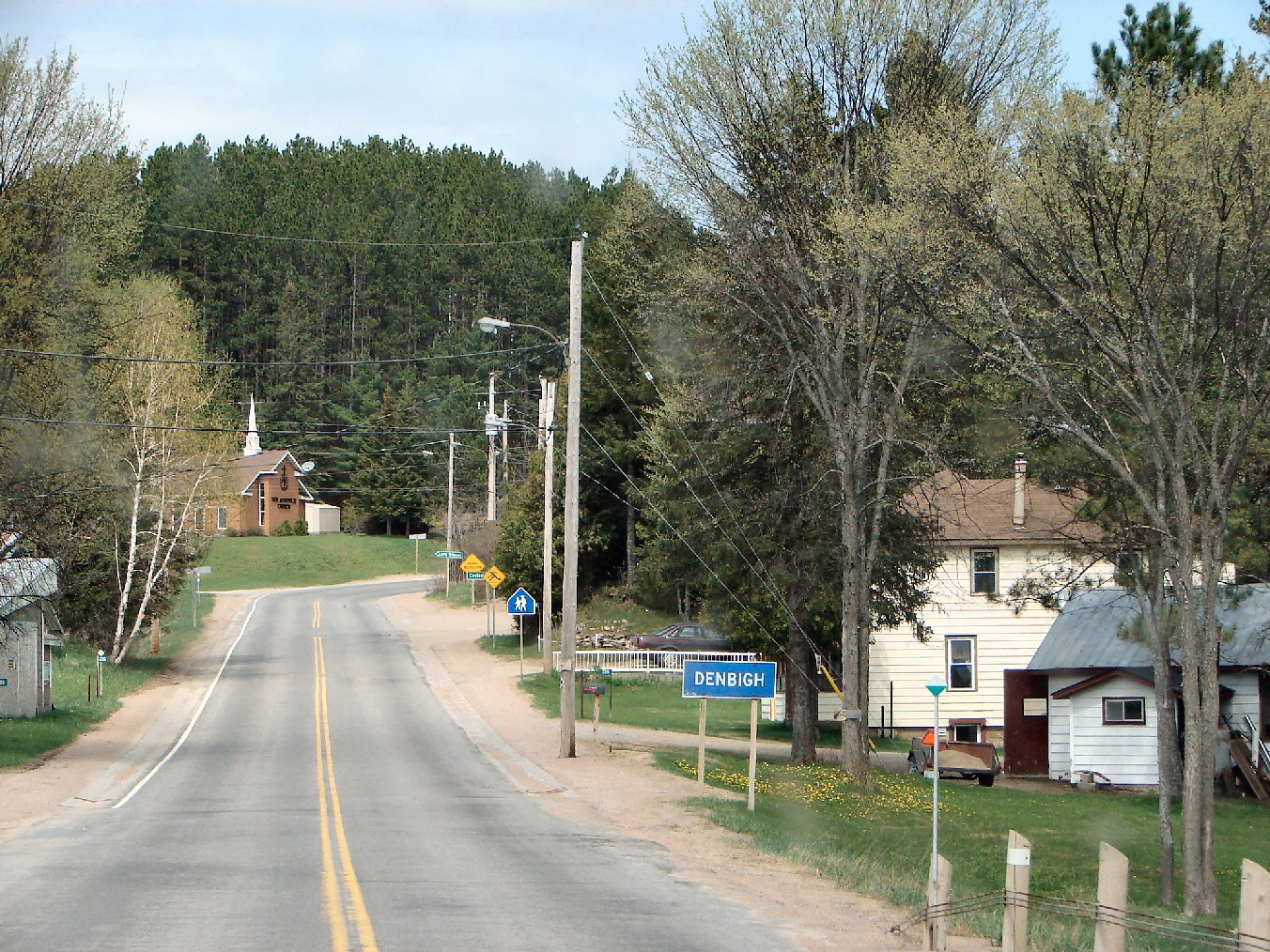
- Interactive map of Denbigh
- Country: Canada
- Province: Ontario
- County: Lennox and Addington
- Township: Addington Highlands

Denbigh is a village in the Addington Highlands of central Ontario. It shares its name with the rather larger Denbigh, Wales.

== Geography and services ==
Denbigh is located on the north shore of Denbigh Lake, a small (~2 sq. km) lake surrounded by low hills which rise to around 400 metres above sea level, at the mouth of Hyde Creek. Geologically, Denbigh is in the Grenville Province of Canada. According to maps published by GeologyOntario (Ministry of Energy and Mines), the village is set in an area dominated by metasedimentary rocks, with more clastic rocks to the north and carbonates to the south. Rocks found in the area include limestone, marble, calc-silicates, conglomerate, wacke, arenite, and chert. There are also large expanses of early felsic plutonic rock nearby. The village is centred on Highway 28, less than a kilometre west of the junction with Highway 41.

The Addington Highlands Public Library has an accessible branch on Central St. with DVDs and computer access.

== History ==
The land around Denbigh was surveyed in the late 1850s as part of colonization drive for Lennox and Addington County. The township of Denbigh was created in 1859 and populated by a few early pioneers, including a German miller. In 1861, some sixty-three colonists in more than two dozen families settled in the Addington region, primarily around Denbigh. Logging was a major local industry into the 20th century. In the 1870s, a water-powered gristmill was built by local farmers. In the first decade of the 1900s, the mill was upgraded to use rollers, brought by train to Kaladar and then three days by horse. The construction of Highway 41 in the 1930s directed local labour to more appealing jobs elswhere, and the mill closed in 1947. A one-room schoolhouse, the Denbigh Continuation School, served the village in the early 20th century.

== Gallery ==
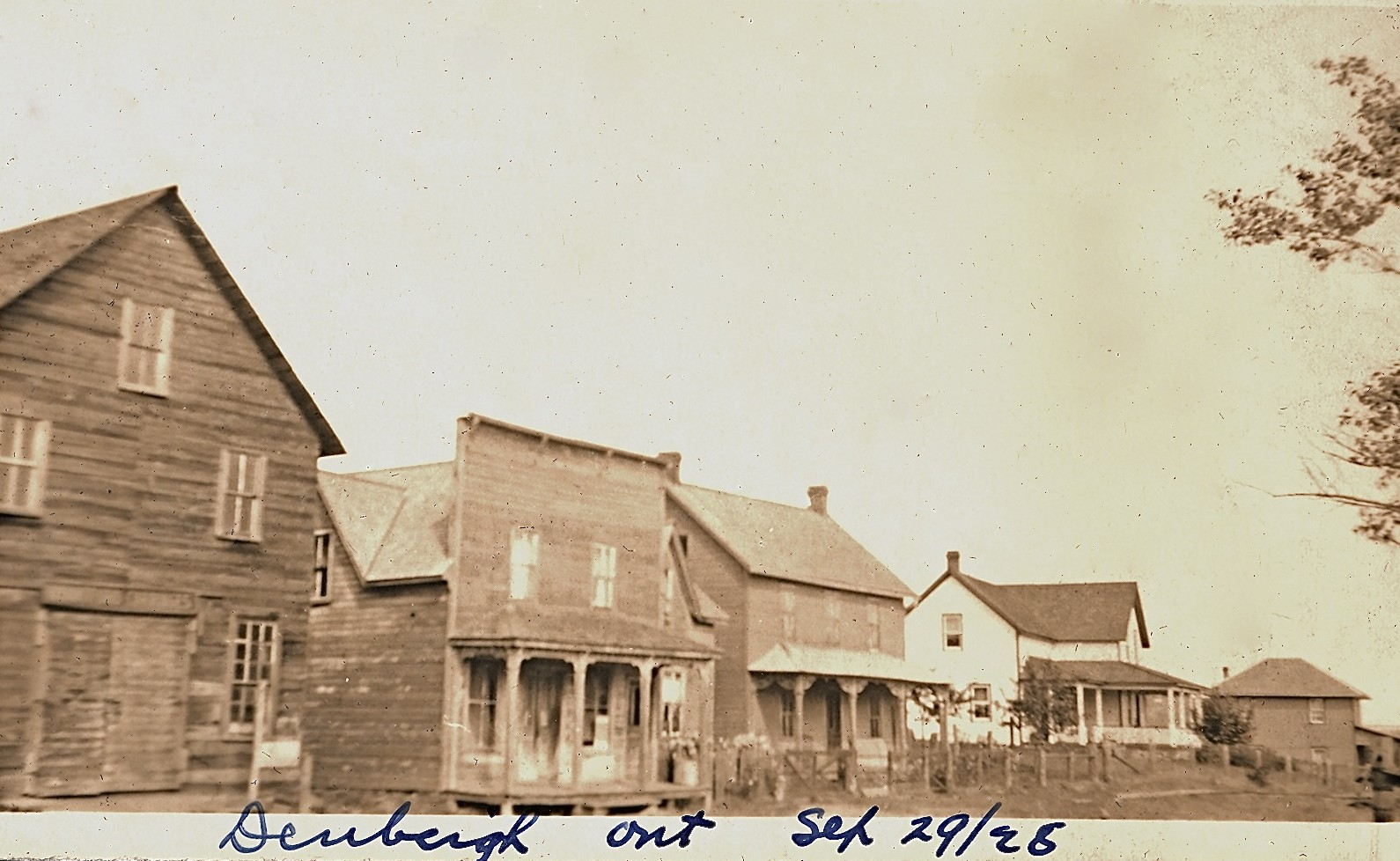
Denbigh in 1928

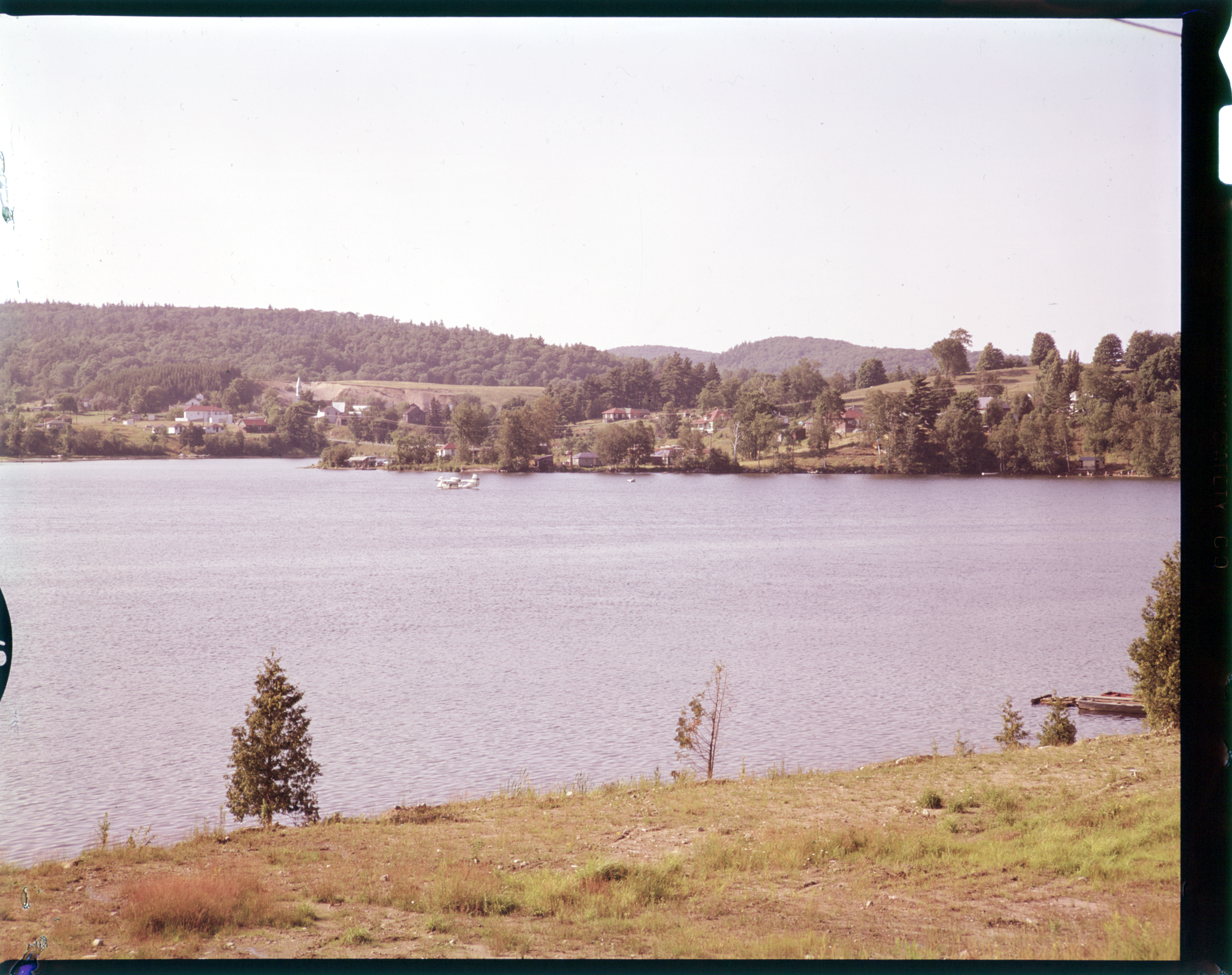
Denbigh in 1952

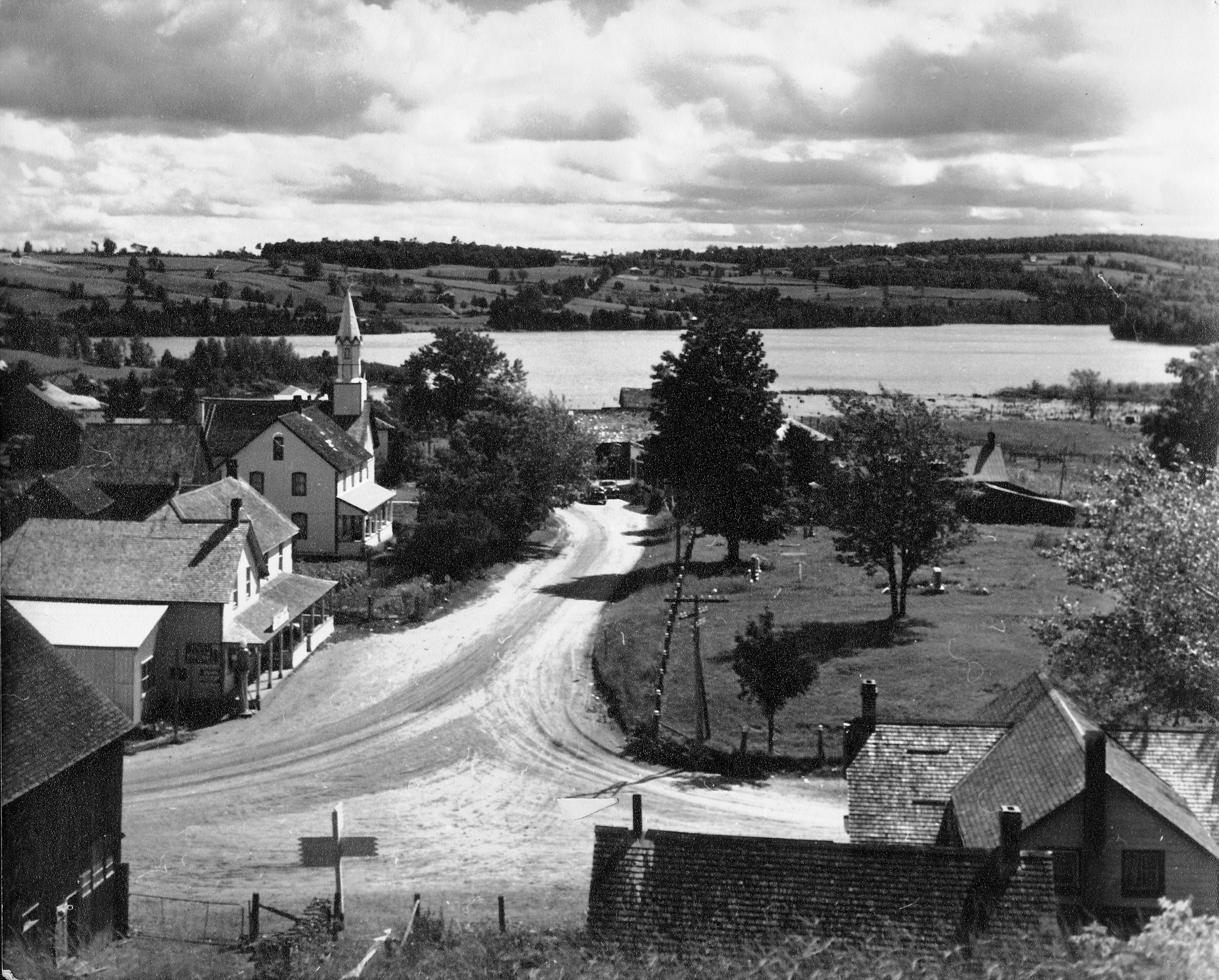
Undated photograph of Denbigh from a nearby hill

== Bibliography ==
- Brown, Gene; Brumell, Nadine, eds. (1974). The Oxen and the Axe (1st ed.). The Madoc Review Limited.
- Hermer, Christina (1999). This Was Yesterday: A History of the Village of Denbigh and the Townships of Denbigh, Abinger and Ashby.
