= Elzevir Creek =

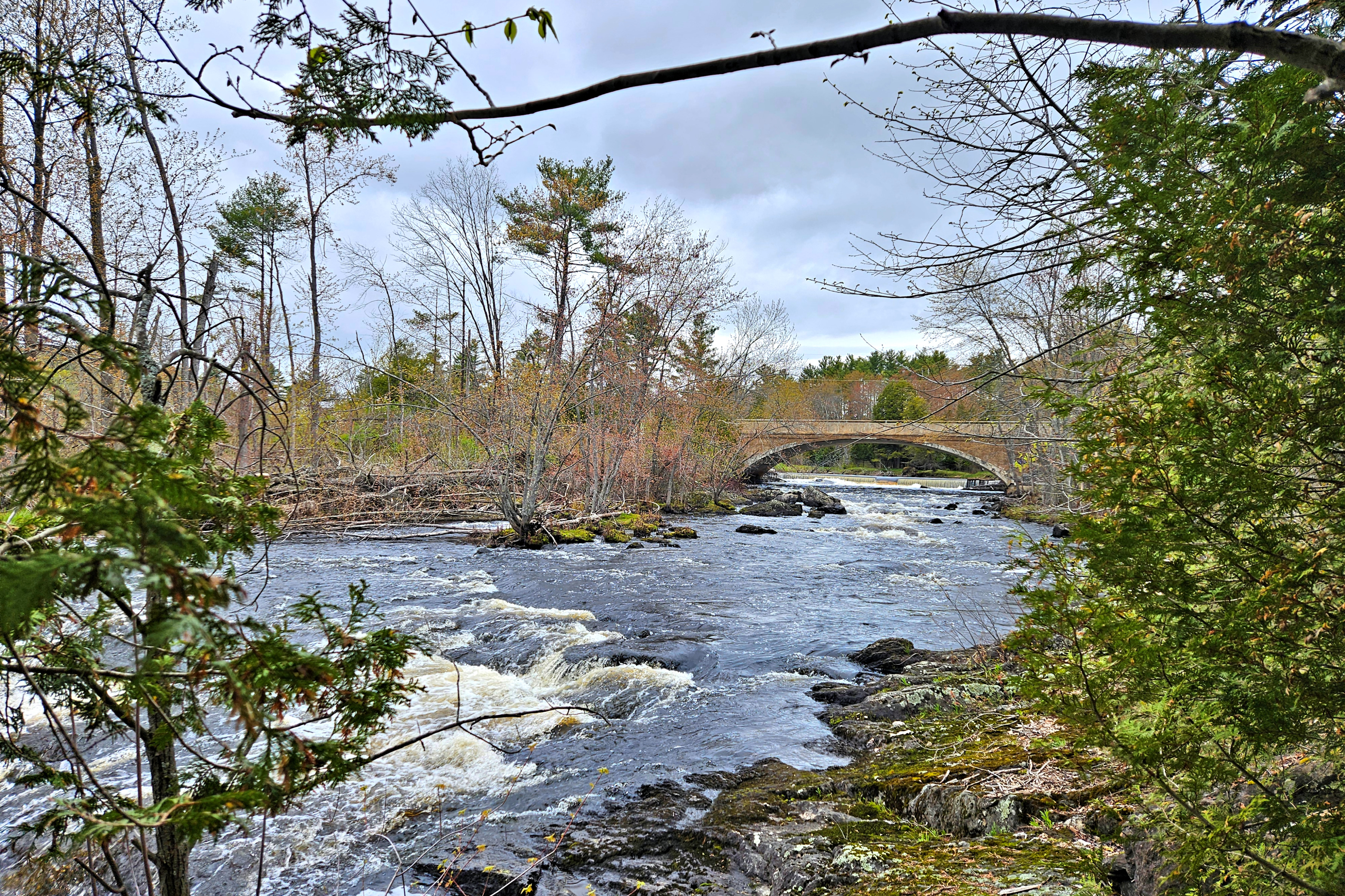
- Elzevir Creek at Actinolite

- Location of the mouth of Elzevir Creek in southern Ontario

Location
- Country: Canada
- Province: Ontario
- Region: Central Ontario
- County: Hastings
- Municipality: Tweed

Physical characteristics
- Source: Unnamed lake
  - coordinates: 44°42′14″N 77°20′54″W
  - elevation: 257 m (843 ft)
- Mouth: Skootamatta River
  - coordinates: 44°33′57″N 77°19′12″W
  - elevation: 174 m (571 ft)

Basin features
- Progression: Elzevir→ Skootamatta→ Moira→ Lake Ontario
- River system: Great Lakes Basin

Elzevir Creek is a creek in the Moira River and Lake Ontario drainage basins in Tweed, Hastings County in Central Ontario, Canada.

== Course ==
Elzevir Creek begins at an unnamed lake, about 10 kilometres (6 mi) west of the community of Flinton, at an elevation of 257 metres (843 ft). It flows southeast into Elzevir Lake, then follows a circuitous route to reach its mouth at the Skootamatta River, just north of Highway 7, at the community of Actinolite and at an elevation of 174 metres (571 ft). The Skootamatta River flows via the Moira River into the Bay of Quinte on Lake Ontario at Belleville.

== See also ==
- List of rivers of Ontario
