= Rainy Lake (disambiguation) =

Rainy Lake is a lake on the border between Ontario, Canada, and Minnesota, United States.

Rainy Lake may refer to:

- Rainy Lake (Moira drainage basin), a lake in Ontario, Canada
- Rainy Lake (Snake Creek drainage basin), a lake in Ontario, Canada
- Rainy Lake, Minnesota, an unorganized territory in Minnesota, United States

== See also ==
- Rainy Lake Falls, in Washington state
- Rainy Lake and River Bands of Saulteaux, a First Nations group in Minnesota and Ontario
