= A Rainy Day =

A Rainy Day may refer to:

- A Rainy Day (1940 film), an American animated short
- A Rainy Day (2014 film), an Indian Marathi language film

== See also ==
- A Rainy Day in New York, a 2019 American romantic comedy film
- Rainy Day (disambiguation)
