= Partridge Creek (Ontario) =

- Location of the mouth of Partridge Creek in southern Ontario

Location
- Country: Canada
- Province: Ontario
- Region: Central Ontario; Eastern Ontario
- Counties: Hastings; Lennox and Addington

Physical characteristics
- Source: Unnamed lake
  - location: Tudor and Cashel, Hastings County
  - coordinates: 44°57′28″N 77°29′33″W
  - elevation: 368 m (1,207 ft)
- Mouth: Skootamatta River
  - location: Addington Highlands, Lennox and Addington County
  - coordinates: 44°43′54″N 77°12′32″W
  - elevation: 258 m (846 ft)
- Length: 51 km (32 mi)

Basin features
- River system: Great Lakes Basin
- Tributaries
  - left: Merrill Creek

Partridge Creek is a creek in the Moira River and Lake Ontario drainage basins in Hastings and Lennox and Addington Counties, Ontario, Canada.

== Course ==
Partridge Creek begins at an elevation of 368 metres (1,207 ft) at the outflow of an unnamed lake in the Cashel portion of the township of Tudor and Cashel, Hastings County, about 3.0 kilometres (1.9 mi) southwest of the community of McCrae and just north of Weslemkoon Lake Road that leads to that community. It flows south under the road immediately to Upper Partridge Lake and continues southeast through a series of unnamed lakes, takes in the left tributary Merrill Creek and reaches Grimsthorpe Lake, which straddles the boundary to Lennox and Addington County, at an elevation of 319 metres (1,047 ft). The creek continues in a southeasterly direction to Partridge Lake at an elevation of 288 metres (945 ft). It reaches Deerock Lake at an elevation of 259 metres (850 ft), then flows east over Deerock Dam to its mouth at the Skootamatta River, about 4 kilometres (2.5 mi) west of the community of Northbrook and 4.5 kilometres (2.8 mi) north of Flinton, both in the township of Addington Highlands. The Skootamatta River flows via the Moira River to the Bay of Quinte on Lake Ontario at Belleville.

== See also ==
- List of rivers of Ontario
