= Skootamatta Lake =

Lake in Ontario, Canada

- Location within Ontario
- Location: Addington Highlands, Lennox and Addington County, Ontario
- Coordinates: 44°50′32″N 77°15′06″W
- Primary inflows: Skootamatta River, Killer Creek
- Primary outflows: Skootamatta River
- Basin countries: Canada (Lake Ontario)
- Max. length: 8.2 km (5.1 mi)
- Max. width: 6.1 km (3.8 mi)
- Surface area: 12.9 km^{2} (5.0 sq mi)
- Surface elevation: 289 m (948 ft)
- Islands: Bible Island, Blake Island, Genus Island

Skootamatta Lake is a lake in the Lake Ontario drainage basin in Addington Highlands, Lennox and Addington County, Ontario, Canada. It is 2.7 kilometres (1.7 mi) west of Cloyne, and Bon Echo Provincial Park is located just to the north. The lake's name is thought to come from Ojibwa words meaning "burnt shoreline".

== Geography ==
Skootamatta Lake is about 8.2 kilometres (5.1 mi) long and 6.1 kilometres (3.8 mi) wide, and lies at an elevation of 289 metres (948 ft). There is one named bay in the northwest of the lake called Jacques' Bay, and two named islands, Bible Island and Blake Island. The primary inflow, at the northeast bay, is the Skootamatta River from the direction of Pearson Lake. Secondary inflows are: Killer Creek at the west; an unnamed creek at the west; an unnamed creek at northwest; five unnamed creeks at the northeast bay; three unnamed creeks at the east; and three unnamed creeks at the south, one from Sheldrake Lake. The primary outflow is the Skootamatta River, at the southeast tip of the lake, controlled by the Skootamatta Dam. The dam regulates the level of water in the lake and provides low-flow augmentation and flood control downstream. The Skootamatta River flows via the Moira River to the Bay of Quinte on Lake Ontario.

== Recreation ==
The lake is a popular destination for cottagers and fishermen alike. The lake is easily accessible by car with two main roads leading from Highway 41: Hughes Landing Road, which has a public use boat ramp, and Jacques Bay Road. The lake is also one of the few in the area with an abundance of crown land, so boat traffic on the lake is usually fairly low.

== See also ==
- List of lakes in Ontario
