= Rainy Days =

Rainy Days may refer to:

- Rainy Days (film), a 1928 Our Gang short silent comedy film
- "Rainy Dayz", a 2002 song by Mary J Blige
- "Rainy Dayz" (Raekwon song), 1996
- Rainy Days, a 2005 album by XYZ
- Rainy Days, a 2003 EP by Gentleman
- "Rainy Days", a 1995 song by General Public
- "Rainy Days", a 2023 song by V

== See also ==
- Rainy Day (disambiguation)
- "Rainy Days and Mondays", a 1971 song by the Carpenters
