= Rainy River =

Rainy River can refer to:

- Rainy River (British Columbia), a short river that flows into the Howe Sound
- Rainy River (Marlborough), a tributary of the Pelorus River, Marlborough District, New Zealand
- Rainy River (Michigan), tributary of the Black River
- Rainy River (Minnesota–Ontario), part of the United States-Canada border between Minnesota and Ontario
- Rainy River (Tasman), a river in the Motueka River catchment, Tasman District, New Zealand
- Rainy River, Ontario, a town on the river
- Rainy River First Nations, an Ojibway First nation in Northwest Ontario
- Rainy River District
