= Joeperry Lake =

Lake in Ontario, Canada

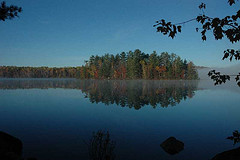

- Location within Ontario
- Location: Addington Highlands, Lennox and Addington County, Ontario
- Coordinates: 44°54′48″N 77°17′45″W
- Primary inflows: One unnamed creek
- Primary outflows: Skootamatta River
- Basin countries: Canada
- Max. length: 2.2 km (1.4 mi)
- Max. width: 1.4 km (0.87 mi)
- Surface elevation: 315 m (1,033 ft)

Joeperry Lake is a lake in the Lake Ontario drainage basin in Addington Highlands, Lennox and Addington County, Ontario, Canada. It measures approximately 13 kilometres (8 mi) northwest of Cloyne and is within Bon Echo Provincial Park.

Joeperry Lake is the source of the Skootamatta River. It is about 2.2 kilometres (1.4 mi) long and 2.2 kilometres (1.4 mi) wide, and lies at an elevation of 315 metres (1,033 ft). There is one inflow, an unnamed creek at the west of the lake. The primary outflow is the Skootamatta River, on the south side of the lake, south to Pearson Lake; a marsh at the east of the lake also connects to Pearson Lake. The Skootamatta River flows via the Moira River into the Bay of Quinte on Lake Ontario.

== See also ==
- List of lakes in Ontario
