= Rainy Day =

Rainy Day may refer to:

== Music ==
- Rainy Day (band), a Paisley Underground band from the 1980s
- Rainy Day (album), a 1965 album by jazz trombonist Kai Winding

=== Songs ===
- "Rainy Day", a song by Ice Nine Kills from their album The Silver Scream 2: Welcome to Horrorwood
- "Rainy Day", a song by Fool's Garden from their album Go and Ask Peggy for the Principal Thing
- "Rainy Day", a song by Ayumi Hamasaki from her album (Miss)understood
- "Rainy Day", a song by Coldplay from their EP Prospekt's March
- "Rainy Day", a song by The Corrs as a B-side to "Love to Love You"
- "Rainy Day", a song by America from their eponymous debut album
- "Rainy Day", a song by The Rascals, the B-side to the single "A Beautiful Morning"
- "Rainy Day", a song by 10,000 Maniacs from their 1997 album Love Among the Ruins
- "Rainy Day," a song by Janel Parrish from the 2007 film Bratz
- "Rainy Day", a song by Plain White T's from their 2008 album Big Bad World

== Other uses ==
- Rainy day fund, money to be used in times when regular income is disrupted
- "Rainy Day", an episode of the American children's television program Pee-wee's Playhouse
- Rainy Day (video game), a game by Thais Weiller
- "Rainy Day", a poem by The Wiggles on their 1992 album Here Comes a Song

== See also ==
- Rainy Days (disambiguation)
- A Rainy Day (disambiguation)
- Paris Street; Rainy Day, an 1877 oil painting by the French artist Gustave Caillebotte
- "Here's That Rainy Day", a 1953 song by Jimmy Van Heusen and Johnny Burke
- "Rainy Day Women No. 12 & 35", a 1966 song by Bob Dylan
- "Rainy Day, Dream Away", a 1968 song by The Jimi Hendrix Experience
- "Rainy Day Daydream", an episode of the TV series Adventure Time
