= Ontario Highway 41 =

Ontario provincial highway

Highway 41
- A map of Highway 41; Highway 41 Connecting Links; Former section (pre-1997)

Route information
- Maintained by the Ministry of Transportation of Ontario
- Length: 159.6 km (99.2 mi)
- Existed: May 1, 1935–present

Major junctions
- South end: Highway 7 in Kaladar
- Highway 28 in Denbigh; Highway 132 near Dacre; Highway 60 in Eganville; Highway 17 near Pembroke
- North end: Highway 148 in Pembroke

Location
- Country: Canada
- Province: Ontario

Highway system
- Ontario provincial highways; Current; Former; 400-series
← Highway 40	→ Highway 48
Former provincial highways
Highway 42 →

King's Highway 41, commonly referred to as Highway 41, is a provincially maintained highway in the Canadian province of Ontario. The 159.6-kilometre (99.2 mi) highway travels in a predominantly north–south direction across eastern Ontario, from Highway 7 in Kaladar to Highway 148 in Pembroke. The majority of this distance crosses through a rugged forested region known as Mazinaw Country. However, the route enters the agricultural Ottawa Valley near Dacre. A significant portion of Highway 41 follows the historic Addington Colonization Road, built in 1854.

Highway 41 was first assumed in 1935, though ironically the initial route is no longer part of the highway. It was extended north to meet the eastern terminus of Highway 60 at Golden Lake in 1937. The following year, a southern discontinuous section of the highway was established north from Picton in Prince Edward County. A series of changes in 1957 extended Highway 60 east to Renfrew and Highway 41 north to Pembroke; this established a concurrency of the two highways through Eganville, which remains to this day.

At its greatest length, Highway 41 travelled from Highway 2 in Napanee north to Highway 17 and Highway 62 in Pembroke, a distance of 234.5 km (145.7 mi), including the discontinuous southern section. The Prince Edward County section was renumbered as Highway 49 in 1965 in anticipation of the building of the Quinte Skyway, while the original section, between Highway 2 and Highway 7, was transferred to Lennox and Addington County in 1998, and is now County Road 41.

== Route description ==
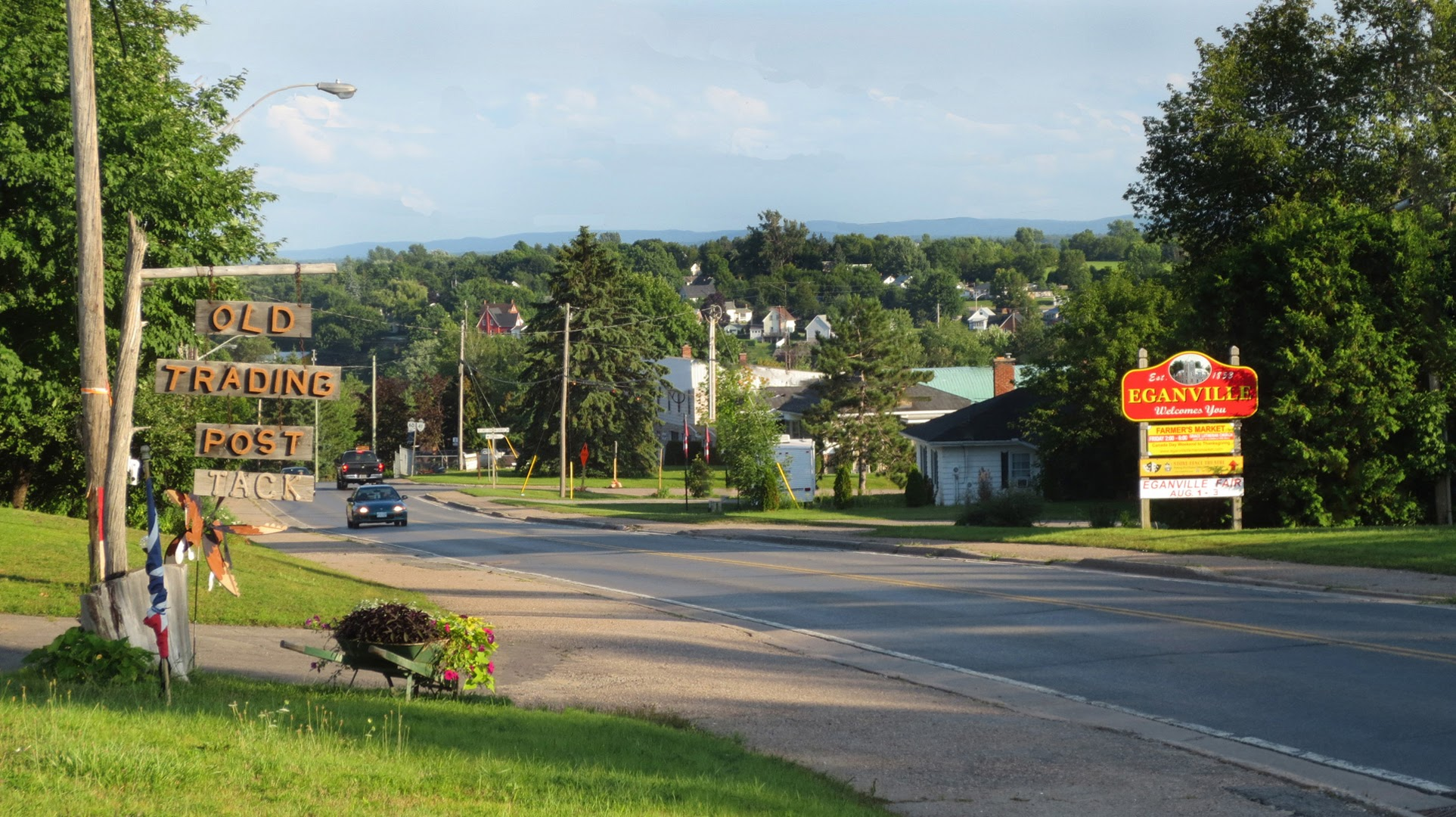
Highway 41 and Highway 60 facing south into Eganville

Highway 41 is a 159.6 km (99.2 mi) highway that travels in a north–south direction from Highway 7 in Kaladar to Highway 148 in Pembroke. The majority of this distance crosses through a rugged forested region of Eastern Ontario known as Mazinaw Country. However, the route enters the Ottawa Valley at a point between Dacre and Eganville; north of there the land use surrounding the highway becomes partially agricultural.

Traffic levels along Highway 41, in 2016, were highest near Pembroke, where approximately 5,300 vehicles travelled the road on an average day. Volumes are lowest through the Mazinaw Country portion of the route, between Bon Echo Provincial Park and Eganville, where less than 2,000, and as few as 1,300 vehicles, travel the highway on an average day. With the exception of a few short passing lanes, the entire length of the highway is two lanes wide.

Two locations along Highway 41 are maintained under a Connecting Link agreement between the Ministry of Transportation of Ontario (MTO) and the local municipality, in which funding for maintenance is split between the two. These Connecting Links are located through the towns of Eganville and Pembroke, and are 2.0 km (1.2 mi) and 4.0 km (2.5 mi) long, respectively. The remainder of the highway is maintained solely by the MTO.

=== Kaladar – Madawaska River ===
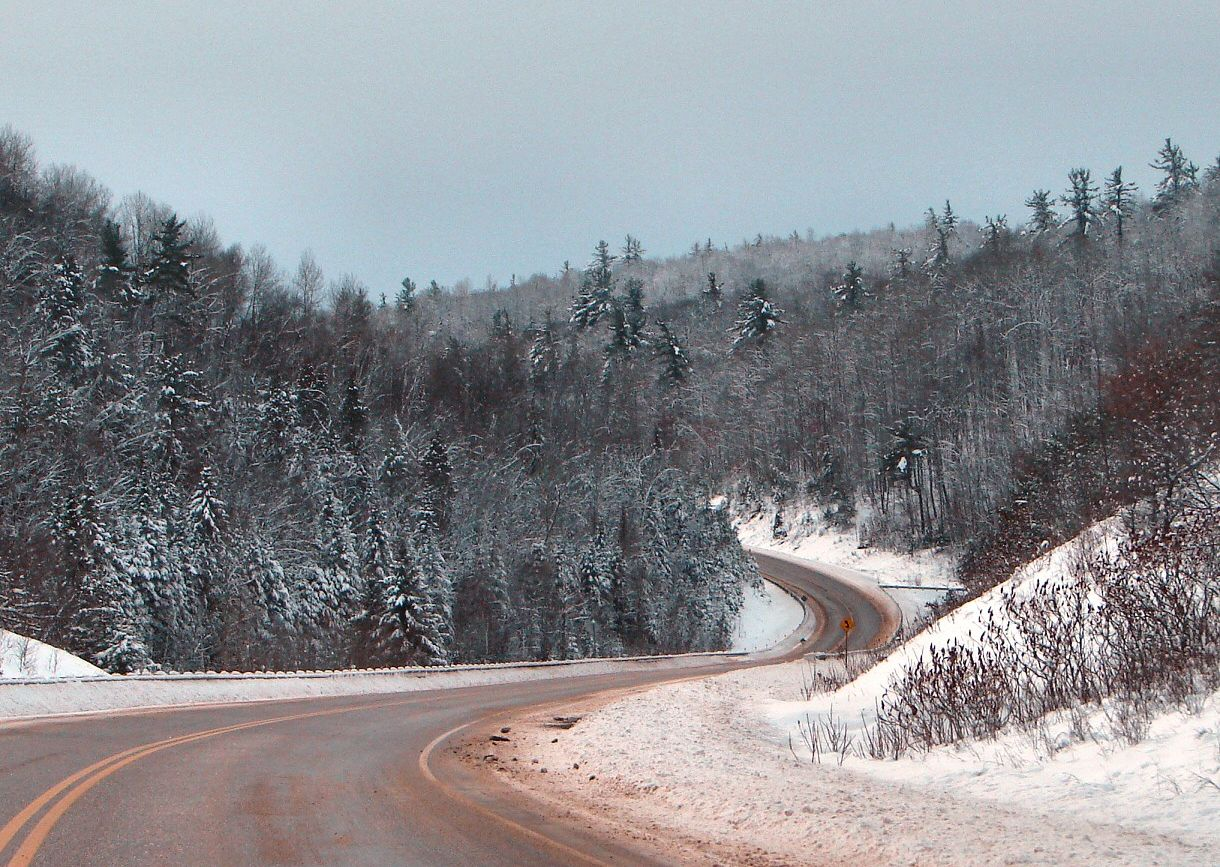
Highway 41 winding through the Opeongo Hills in Renfrew County

Highway 41 begins in the centre of Lennox and Addington County at Highway 7, in the village of Kaladar. The highway once continued south to Napanee, but this is now County Road 41. It travels north, immediately ascending Kaladar Hill into a swamp-laden, heavily-forested region of the Canadian Shield, roughly following the Addington Colonization Road. After passing through the village of Northbrook, the highway — and more accurately, the original Addington Road — straddle the boundary between Lennox and Addington County and Frontenac County, as well as the municipalities of Addington Highlands and North Frontenac. It passes through the community of Cloyne, then meets the southernmost point of Mazinaw Lake, of which it travels near or along the western shore.

The highway enters Bon Echo Provincial Park, which sits near the midpoint of the lake. Within the park is Mazinaw Rock, a large 100-metre-high (330 ft) pictograph-laden granite rock escarpment, as well as a National Historic Site of Canada. North of the park, Highway 41 — now entirely within Lennox and Addington County — continues alongside the northern half of Mazinaw Lake, and thereafter the Mississippi River, to the headwaters of the latter at Mackavoy Lake. Passing through Ferguson Corners, it departs eastward from the Addington Colonization Road. At Vennachar Junction, it turns north, then encounters Highway 28 just east of the town of Denbigh. Meandering northeast from there, the highway roughly parallels Hydes Creek to its confluence with the Madawaska River before curving east into Renfrew County. It crosses the river on a multiple-span concrete rigid arch bridge just prior to entering the community of Griffith. This bridge also serves as the downstream end of Lower Madawaska River Provincial Park.

=== Madawaska River – Pembroke ===
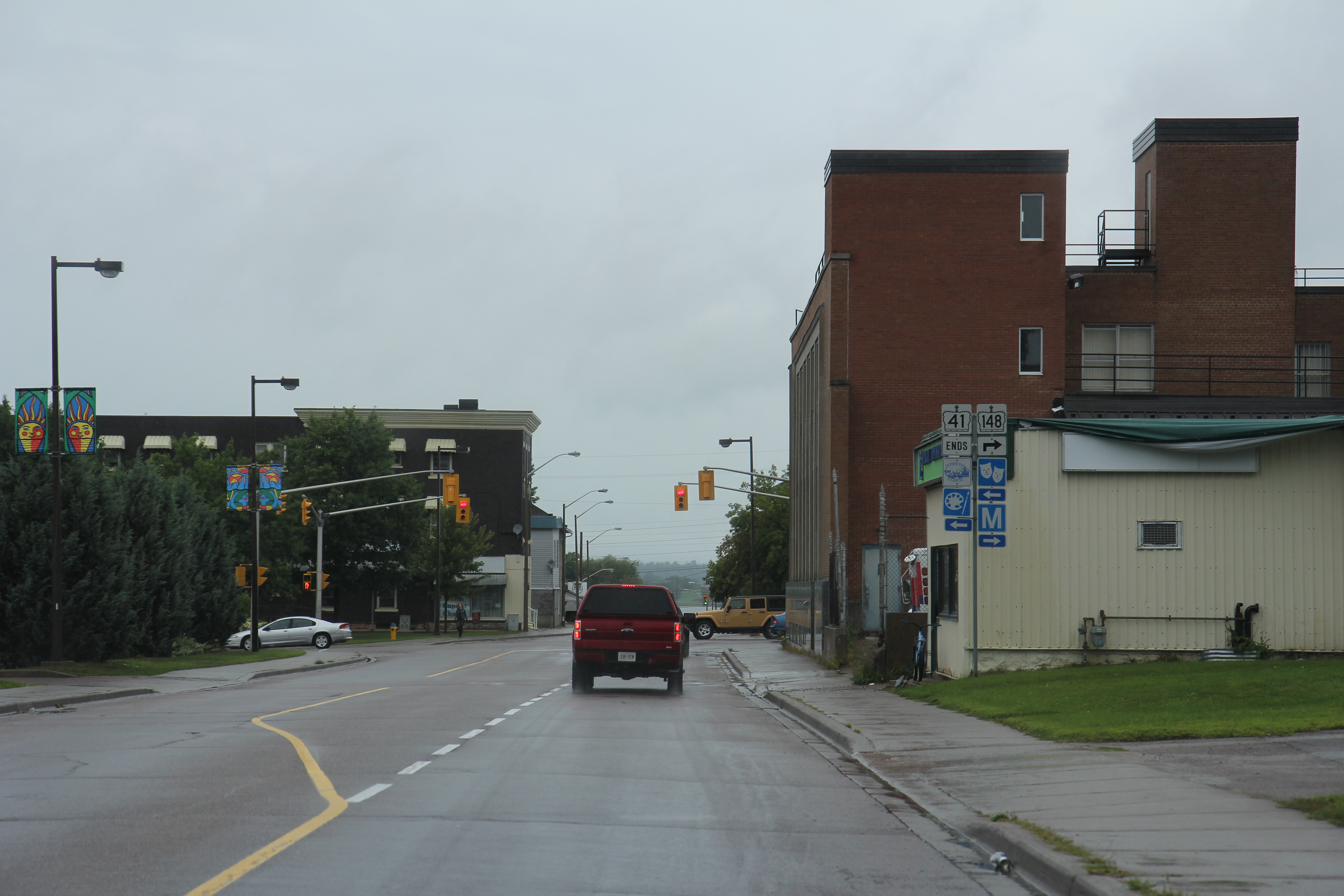
Highway 41 ends at the intersection of Mackay Street and Pembroke Street in Pembroke; Highway 148 is to the right at the traffic signals.

Beyond Griffith, Highway 41 travels through the municipality of Greater Madawaska. It winds in a generally northeast direction towards Dacre. West of that community, it descends into the Ottawa Valley and meets Highway 132. At that junction, drivers must turn to remain on Highway 41; Highway 132 continues through Dacre. The route proceeds north, now in the municipality of Bonnechere Valley, and shortly after passing Constant Lake, straightens towards Eganville. Farmland appears for the first time at the hamlet of Perrault. An intersection with former Highway 512 marks the entrance to Eganville, as well as the beginning of the Connecting Link Agreement through the town. After crossing the Bonnechere River, it meets Highway 60, with both highways becoming concurrent northward; the Connecting Link ends at Hartwig Street.

Approximately 3 km (1.9 mi) north of Eganville, Highway 41 departs from Highway 60 and travels eastward through a mixture a farmland and forests within the municipality of North Algona Wilberforce. It gradually wraps around the east side of Lake Doré, before curving northward. After crossing Snake Creek at the northeastern tip of the lake, the highway travels straight north through forests. It passes through several communities within a short distance, the most significant of which is Rankin. Near its northern end, the route zig-zags into the municipality of Laurentian Valley, then curves northeast to intersect Highway 17 on the outskirts of Pembroke. Within the town, both Highway 41 and Highway 148 are maintained under a Connecting Link Agreement. Highway 41 follows Paul Martin Drive, River Road, and Mackay Street through Pembroke before ending just south of the Ottawa River. The intersection of Mackay Street and Pembroke Street serves as the northern terminus of Highway 41, as well as the western terminus of Highway 148.

== History ==
A rock cut was created north of Roblin in 1948, bypassing several sharp curves and steep grades along the old route (at right). Short realignments such as this were constructed throughout the highway during the 1940s.

Although it did not become a provincial highway until the 1930s, the route that Highway 41 follows is similar to several colonization roads established in the mid-1800s. These forest-bound "roads", built to encourage settlement deeper into the province, were infamously rough wagon trails during dry times, and impassable quagmires throughout the spring and fall. The Addington Road, which travelled north from the Clare River (approximately 15 km (9.3 mi) south of Kaladar) to the Opeongo Line, would go on to form the nucleus of Highway 41 as far north as Denbigh. A rough line for this road was surveyed by Robert Bell in 1847. Construction as far north as the Madawaska River was carried out under the supervision of local surveyor Aylsworth B. Perry between 1854 and 1857. However, until the construction of Highway 41, travel through the Addington Highlands and Opeongo Hills was slow and arduous.

=== Provincial assumption ===
Highway 41 was first established by the provincial government in the mid-1930s. The first section established is ironically the only section that was decommissioned as a provincial highway in 1998. On May 1, 1935, the Department of Highways (DHO) designated the Napanee–Kaladar Road through Lennox and Addington County, a distance of 49.5 kilometres (30.8 mi), and numbered it as Highway 41. Just over two years later, the route was extended to Highway 60 at Golden Lake. The DHO assumed the portion within Lennox and Addington on October 6, 1937, followed two weeks later by the portion within Renfrew County on October 20. This extended the highway by 125.4 kilometres (77.9 mi). Both Highway 60 and Highway 41 shared a terminus at a junction in Golden Lake from 1948 until 1957, when the Eganville to Pembroke Road was designated as Highway 41. The section between Eganville and Golden Lake consequently became an extension of Highway 60.

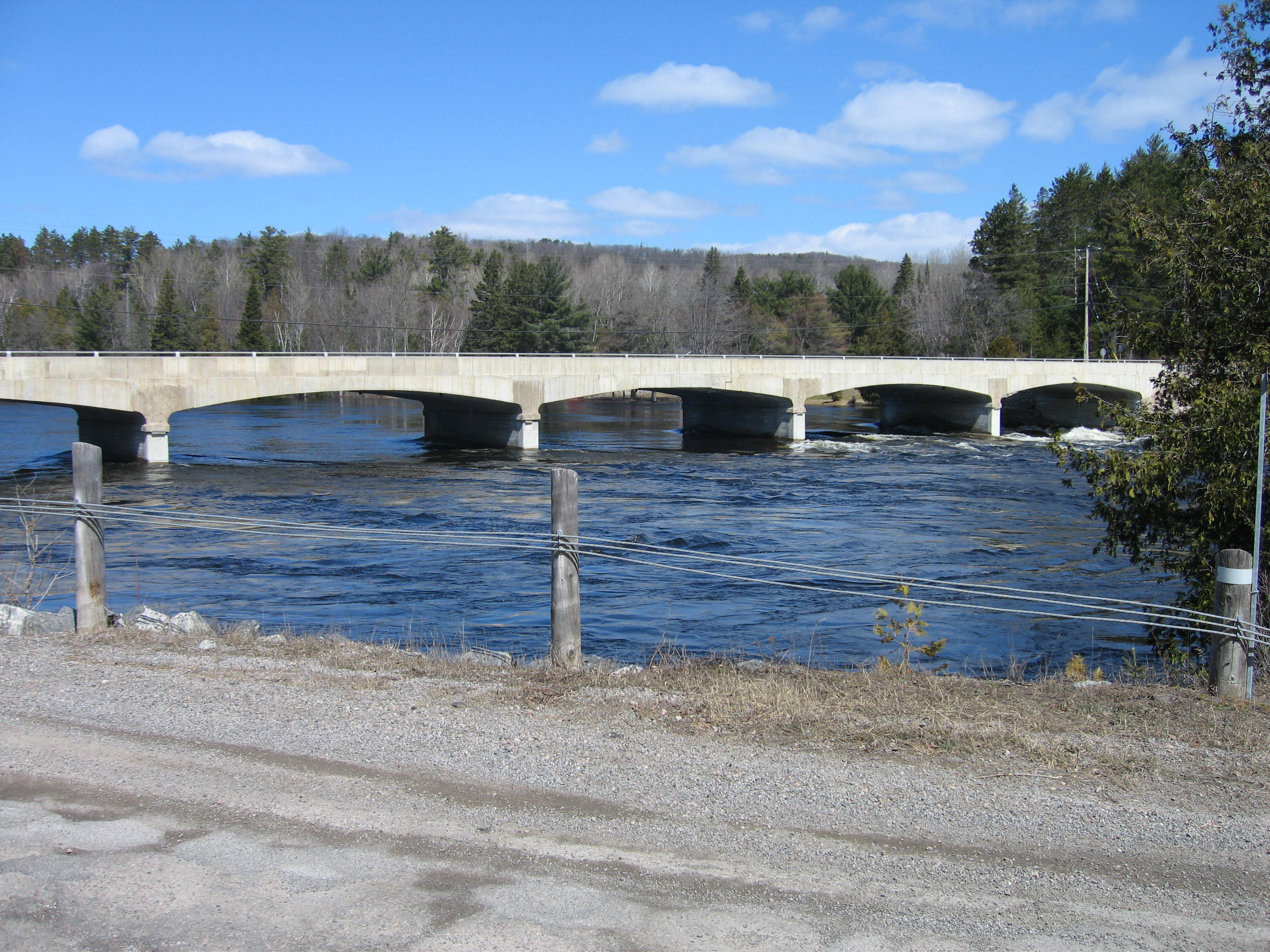
Highway 41 crosses the Madawaska River near Griffith on a multi-span concrete rigid arch bridge.

Most of Highway 41 was an unimproved road prior to 1935. Only two sections were paved: the route through Erinsville — initially following Furlong Road — was paved from Keegans Road south through the village to the cutoff to Tamworth, while the Selby Road was paved from Napanee north to Sharps Corners. Paving operations on the route did not begin until the 1940s, starting with the section through Eganville in 1941. In the intermediate years, several new alignments, bypassing the route of the original Addington Road, were graded and opened as gravel roads. Construction of the multi-span Madawaska River Bridge in Griffith began in 1940. It was completed and, along with a bypass east of Denbigh, opened in 1942. Construction of an unpaved diversion at Bon Echo, bypassing the original route along what is now Mazinaw Heights Road, was completed in 1943. Highway 41 was paved and realigned from north of Eganville to Golden Lake (along what is now Highway 60) in 1944, and from Kaladar to Northbrook in 1945. A 25 km (16 mi) section from Erinsville to Kaladar was improved in 1947, as was approximately 11 km (7 mi) between Northbrook and Cloyne, and 20 km (12 mi) from Dacre to Egansville. Paving and improvements between Cloyne and Dacre were carried out over the next three years: from Denbigh to Dacre in 1948; from Bon Echo to Mackavoy Lake in 1949, and the remaining gaps from Cloyne to Bon Echo and from Mackavoy Lake to Denbigh in 1950. The final gravel section, between Roblin and Erinsville, was paved in 1953.

=== Prince Edward County ===
Within Prince Edward County, a southern discontinuous section of Highway 41 existed from 1938 to 1965. On April 13, 1938, the DHO took over the road between Picton and Cole's Wharf, labelling it as the Picton to Napanee Road. This section never connected directly with Highway 41 north of Napanee, as planned; it would eventually be incorporated into the route of Highway 49 in the mid-1960s. Travelling north from Picton alongside the Bay of Quinte in Prince Edward County, it followed a similar route to the present-day Prince Edward County Road 49, as far as Roblin Mills. From there it curved to follow County Road 35. The entire early route was known as the Lower High Shore Road; there was no road directly north from Roblin Mills. Highway 41 passed through Mount Carmel before ending at Cole's Wharf, where a ferry crossed to Huff's Wharf. County roads continued thereafter to Napanee. The length of this section was 17.6 km (10.9 mi).

Like the rest of Highway 41, this section was unpaved at first. It was paved 3 km (1.9 mi) north from Picton to County Road 6 in 1939. Approximately 7 km (4 mi) between Picton and Woodville were paved in 1946. The remainder of the southern portion, to Cole's Wharf, was paved by 1948.

A span across the Bay of Quinte, which separates most of Prince Edward County from the Ontario mainland, was a significant undertaking that required funding and manpower that was unavailable through the war years. It would take until the 1960s until proposals for a high-level bridge over the waterway gained traction. In November 1964, the first contract for construction on the Quinte Skyway, west of Deseronto, was awarded. The DHO had planned to begin work in September 1962, but funding was unavailable. Severe winter weather prevented work on the contract from proceeding until the spring of 1965, by which time the entire southern section of Highway 41 had been renumbered as Highway 49. The Quinte Skyway, and a realigned Highway 49, were both completed in September 1967, with premier John Robarts opening the bridge during a motorcade on September 6.

=== North to Pembroke ===
Animation of highway routes near Pembroke, from 1936 to now

Highway 41 was extended to Pembroke on April 11, 1957, when the road north of Eganville and around Lake Dore was assumed by the DHO. For nearly two decades, the route followed the shoreline of Lake Dore along what is now Point Church Drive. During the mid-1960s, proposals were raised to bypass the majority of the new extension, including both the current route south of Lake Dore, as well as a new route from there to Highway 17 that was ultimately never built. The unbuilt bypass would have travelled northeast from Lake Dore, passing near Micksburg and ending mid-way between Cobden and Pembroke. The bypass around Lake Dore was completed between 1978 and 1980.

Within Pembroke, Highway 41 entered the town as it does today, but curved northwest onto Boundary Road to avoid crossing the Muskrat River. It followed Boundary Road to end at Highway 62 (Bruham Avenue). In 1962, the route was redirected to downtown Pembroke via Eganville Road and Christie Street to end at Highway 17/62 (Pembroke Street West). This routing remained in place until the Highway 17 Pembroke Bypass opened on September 10, 1982, after which the current path of Highway 41 along Paul Martin Drive, River Road and Mackay Street was established. The former route of Highway 17 along Pembroke Street was subsequently renumbered as Highway 148.

=== Downloading ===
As part of a series of budget cuts initiated by premier Mike Harris under his Common Sense Revolution platform in 1995, numerous highways deemed to no longer be of significance to the provincial network were decommissioned and responsibility for the routes transferred to a lower level of government, a process referred to as downloading. On January 1, 1998, the section of Highway 41 between Highway 2 in Napanee and Highway 7 in Kaladar was transferred to the county of Lennox and Addington, truncating the highway by 48.9 kilometres (30.4 mi).

== Major intersections ==
The following table lists the major junctions along Highway 41. In addition, it includes some minor junctions that are noted by the Ministry of Transportation of Ontario.

Division	Location	km	mi	Destinations	Notes
Lennox and Addington	Greater Napanee	−50.8	−31.6	County Road 41 begins County Road 8 south (Centre Street) County Road 2 (Dundas Street)	Former Highway 41 southern terminus; formerly Highway 2
Lennox and Addington	Greater Napanee	−48.4	−30.1	Highway 401 – Toronto, Kingston	Highway 401 exit 579
Lennox and Addington	Addington Highlands	0.0	0.0	Highway 41 begins County Road 41 ends Highway 7 / TCH – Peterborough, Ottawa	Kaladar; Highway 41 southern terminus
Lennox and Addington	Addington Highlands	7.8	4.8	County Road 29 west	Flinton Corners
Lennox and Addington–Frontenac boundary	Addington Highlands–North Frontenac boundary	18.3	11.4	North Frontenac Township Road 506 east – Plevna	Cloyne; formerly Highway 506 east
Frontenac	North Frontenac	30.1	18.7	Bon Echo Provincial Park	
Lennox and Addington	Addington Highlands	57.5	35.7	County Road 30 (Buckshot Lake Road)	
Lennox and Addington	Addington Highlands	63.2	39.3	Highway 28 west – Bancroft	Denbigh
Renfrew	Greater Madawaska	78.7	48.9	County Road 71 (Matawatchan Road) – Camel Chute	Griffith
Renfrew	Bonnechere Valley	101.1	62.8	Highway 132 east – Dacre, Renfrew	Historic Ottawa and Opeongo Road
Renfrew	Bonnechere Valley	102.7	63.8	County Road 64 west (Opeongo Road)	
Renfrew	Bonnechere Valley	113.1	70.3	County Road 22 east (Grattan Road) – Douglas	
Renfrew	Bonnechere Valley (Eganville)	121.5	75.5	County Road 512 west (Foymount Road)	Beginning of Eganville Connecting Link agreement; formerly Highway 512 west
Renfrew	Bonnechere Valley (Eganville)	122.6	76.2	Highway 60 east – Renfrew	Southern end of Highway 60 concurrency
Renfrew	Bonnechere Valley (Eganville)	123.3	76.6		End of Eganville Connecting Link agreement
Renfrew	North Algona Wilberforce	126.3	78.5	Highway 60 west – Golden Lake, Barry's Bay	End of Highway 60 concurrency
Renfrew	North Algona Wilberforce	135.5	84.2	County Road 9 east (Bulger Road)	Lake Dore
Renfrew	North Algona Wilberforce	135.7	84.3	County Road 30 west (Lake Dore Road) – Golden Lake	Lake Dore
Renfrew	North Algona Wilberforce	136.3	84.7	County Road 13 east (Mountain Road)	
Renfrew	North Algona Wilberforce–Laurentian Valley boundary	144.2	89.6	Micksburg Road	Huckabones Corners; formerly County Road 11 south
Renfrew	North Algona Wilberforce–Laurentian Valley boundary	145.7	90.5	County Road 56 west (Woito Station Road)	
Renfrew	Laurentian Valley	148.1	92.0	County Road 24 east (White Water Road)	
Pembroke		155.6	96.7	Highway 17 / TCH – North Bay, Ottawa	Pembroke city limits
Pembroke		156.4	97.2	Boundary Road / Mud Lake Road	Former Highway 41 alignment; to County Road 19 east
Pembroke		159.6	99.2	Highway 148 east (Pembroke Street)	Pembroke Connecting Link agreement; Highway 41 northern terminus
1.000 mi = 1.609 km; 1.000 km = 0.621 mi: Closed/former; Concurrency terminus; Route transition
