= Flinton, Ontario =

Rural community in Ontario, Canada

Flinton
- (Formerly Unincorporated) Hamlet and rural community on Skootamatta River
- Location in southern Ontario
- Coordinates: 44°41′24″N 77°12′37″W
- Country: Canada
- Province: Ontario
- County: Lennox and Addington
- Municipality: Addington Highlands
- Elevation: 255 m (837 ft)
- Time zone: UTC-5 (Eastern Time Zone)
  - Summer (DST): UTC-4 (Eastern Time Zone)
- Postal Code: K0H 1P0
- Area codes: 613, 343

Flinton is a hamlet in and the seat of the municipality of Addington Highlands, Lennox and Addington County in Eastern Ontario, Canada. The population is about 500, and it was founded by Billa Flint. The community is on the Skootamatta River whose falls were used to power many mills. The eponymous Flinton Creek runs nearby and joins the Skootamatta downstream of the community.

The village was built to house Billa Flint's employees, working at his mill on the river, which powered the entire community. Ruins of the mill can be seen at the famous waterfall and swimming hole at the Flinton Conservation Area, nestled in the corner of the village, where the Skootamatta cascades over the dam and takes a sharp left south and rushes under the bridge. This is a very popular spot for kayakers.
