= Kaladar =

Rural community in Ontario, Canada

- Compact rural community Unincorporated area
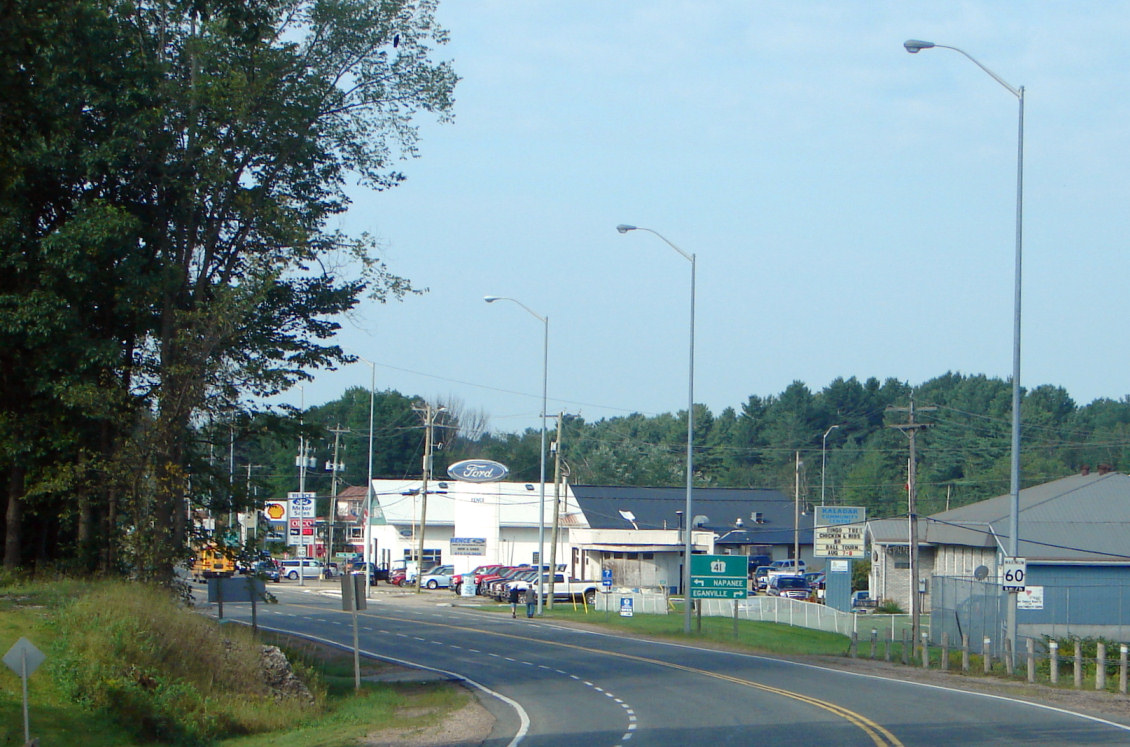
- Kaladar, looking west along Highway 7

- Location in southern Ontario
- Coordinates: 44°38′54″N 77°07′17″W
- Country: Canada
- Province: Ontario
- County: Lennox and Addington
- Municipality: Addington Highlands
- Elevation: 208 m (682 ft)
- Time zone: UTC-5 (Eastern Time Zone)
  - Summer (DST): UTC-4 (Eastern Time Zone)
- Postal Code: K0H 1Z0
- Area codes: 613, 343

Kaladar is a compact rural community in the municipality of Addington Highlands, Lennox and Addington County in Eastern Ontario, Canada. It is located at the junction of Ontario Highway 7 and Ontario Highway 41.

This area was first settled following the construction of the Addington Road in 1857. It was originally named Scouten after its first postmaster. The former Canadian Pacific Railway Havelock Subdivision rail bed passing through the town has been turned into a rail trail and become part of the Trans Canada Trail. The Kaladar fire tower was situated at the north end of the village just off the highway, but was removed some time in the 1970s or 1980s.

The name is also used for Kaladar Township, a geographic township, in which Kaladar lies roughly at the centre.
