= Skootamatta River =

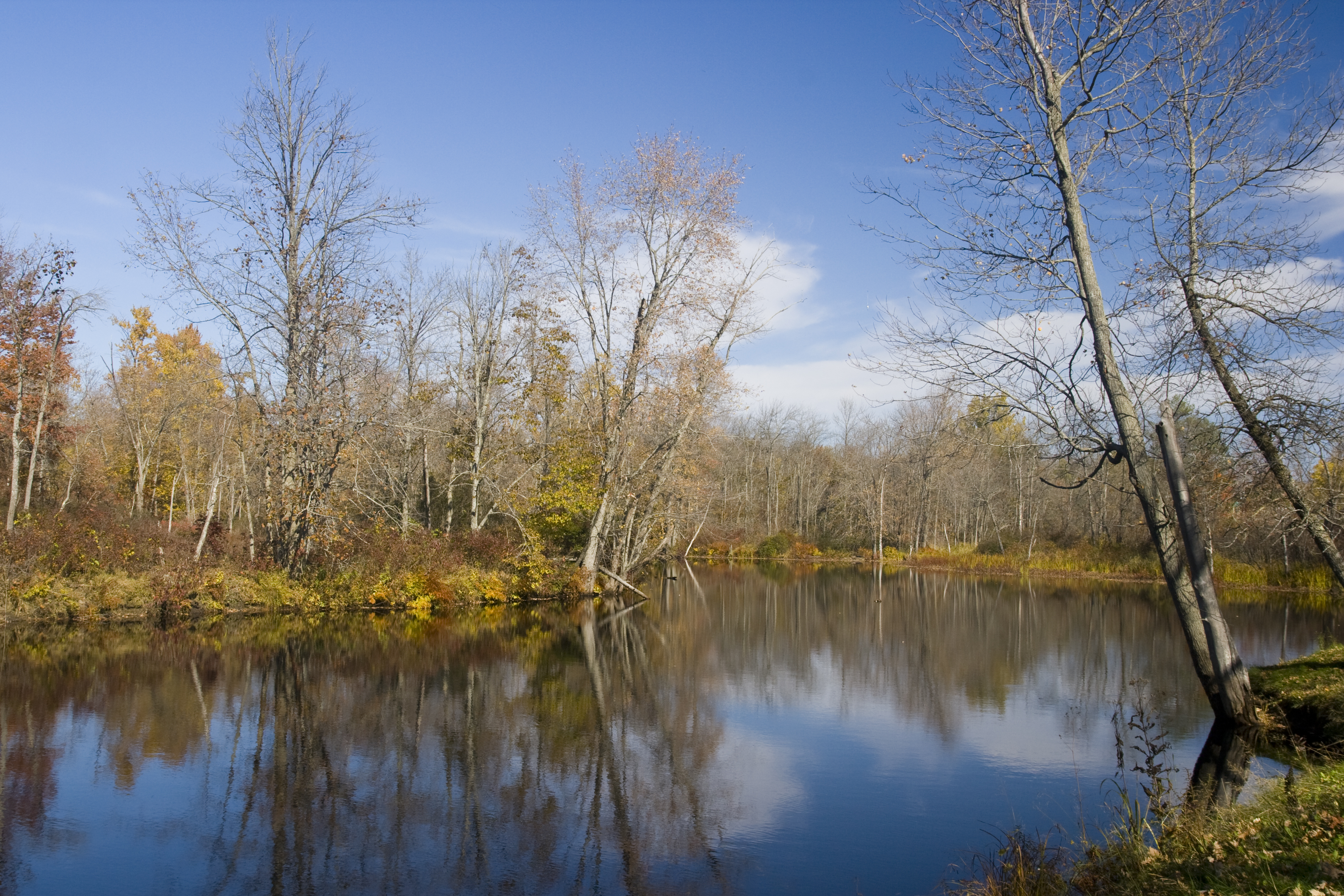
- The Skootamatta River at the picnic area at Highway 7 & Highway 37 in fall

- Location of the mouth of the Skootamatta River in southern Ontario
- Etymology: From the Ojibwa "burnt shoreline"
- Nickname: The Skoot

Location
- Country: Canada
- Province: Ontario
- Region: Central Ontario; Eastern Ontario
- Counties: Hastings; Lennox and Addington

Physical characteristics
- Source: Joeperry Lake
  - location: Addington Highlands, Lennox and Addington County
  - coordinates: 44°48′07″N 77°13′21″W
  - elevation: 315 m (1,033 ft)
- Mouth: Moira River
  - location: Tweed, Hastings County
  - coordinates: 44°31′09″N 77°20′23″W
  - elevation: 152 m (499 ft)
- Length: 74.1 km (46.0 mi)

Basin features
- River system: Great Lakes Basin
- Tributaries
  - left: Flinton Creek, Little Skootamatta Creek
  - right: Rainy Creek, Killer Creek, Partridge Creek, Elzevir Creek

The Skootamatta River is a river in the Lake Ontario drainage basin in Hastings and Lennox and Addington Counties in Ontario, Canada. It flows from Joeperry Lake to join the Moira River in Tweed. The river's name is thought to come from Ojibwa words meaning "burnt shoreline".

== Course ==
The river begins at Joeperry Lake in Bon Echo Provincial Park in Addington Highlands, Lennox and Addington County, northwest of Cloyne, at an elevation of 315 metres (1,033 ft). It flows south, taking in the right tributary Rainy Creek, and reaches Pearson Lake. The river continues south and empties into Skootamatta Lake at an elevation of 289 metres (948 ft). The right tributary Killer Creek joins at the lake. It flows south over Skootamatta Dam, continues south and reaches Slave Lake at an elevation of 277 metres (909 ft). It continues south over a small dam, takes in the right tributary Partridge Creek, and arrives in the community of Flinton. The Skootamatta River then flows over Flinton Dam, heads southwest, passes into Hastings County and takes in the left tributary Flinton Creek at an elevation of 188 metres (617 ft). The river continues south, takes in the left tributary Little Skootamatta Creek at an elevation of 179 metres (587 ft), and turns west just north of Highway 7. The river takes in the right tributary Elzevir Creek, heads southwest under the highway at Actinolite and runs parallel to Highway 37. It reaches its mouth at the Moira River, at an elevation of 152 metres (499 ft), which flows into the Bay of Quinte on Lake Ontario.

== History ==
Until 1908, the river was used to transport logs to sawmills in the Belleville area. At one time, there was a small hydroelectric station on the river near Slave Lake which generated power for a nearby gold mine.

== Tributaries ==
- Elzevir Creek
- Little Skootamatta Creek (left)
- Flinton Creek (left)
- Partridge Creek (right)
- Skootamatta Lake
  - Killer Creek
- Rainy Creek

== Communities ==
- Flinton, Ontario
- Actinolite, Ontario

== Culture ==
The river is mentioned several times in Michael Ondaatje's novel The English Patient as a place where Hana, one of the novel's main characters, once lived. Name of a song sung by the Cobourg, Ontario band Summerhouse on their CD "Summerhouse... In Black"

== See also ==
- List of rivers of Ontario
