= Cloyne, Ontario =

Cloyne
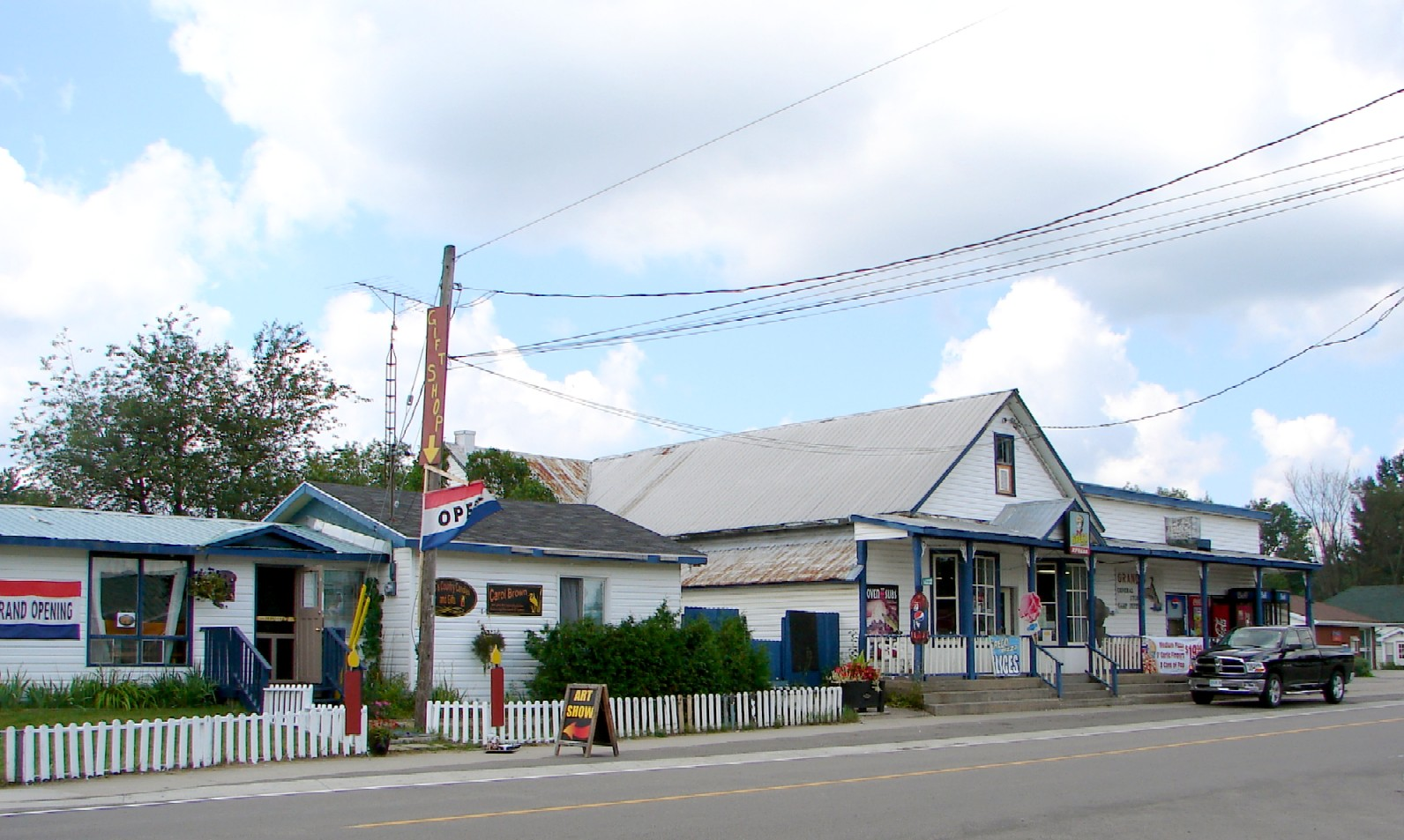
- Etymology: After the town of the same name in Ireland
- Location of Cloyne in Ontario
- Coordinates: 44°48′58″N 77°11′08″W
- Country: Canada
- Province: Ontario
- County: Lennox and Addington
- Township: Addington Highlands
- Elevation: 280 m (920 ft)
- Time zone: UTC-5 (Eastern Time Zone)
  - Summer (DST): UTC-4 (Eastern Time Zone)
- Postal code: K0H 1K0
- Area codes: 613 / 343

Cloyne is a small village in the township of Addington Highlands, Lennox and Addington County, Ontario, Canada. It is located on Highway 41 about 20 kilometres (12 mi) by road north of Kaladar at the crossroads of Highway 41 with Highway 7, with the settlements of Bishop Corners and Northbrook in between, and 43 kilometres (27 mi) by road south of Denbigh, with the settlements of Ferguson Corners and Vennachar Junction in between.

The village offers a number of services for residents, snowmobilers, cottagers and campers, particularly those visiting Bon Echo Provincial Park to the north on Highway 41. There are also number of small shops, providing townspeople and visitors access to groceries, antiques, chainsaw carvings, hardware supplies, gas, and hunting and fishing gear. Cloyne is also home to the North Addington Education Centre and the Pioneer Museum. The village features an oversized wooden white chair (resembling a Muskoka chair), which has been of interest to tourists since 1989, in its various locations. The chair was damaged during a Derecho (storm) in May 2022; as of spring 2023, a local fund raiser was underway, seeking donations that would fully cover the cost of a new chair.
