= Addington Highlands =

- Township (lower-tier)
- Township of Addington Highlands
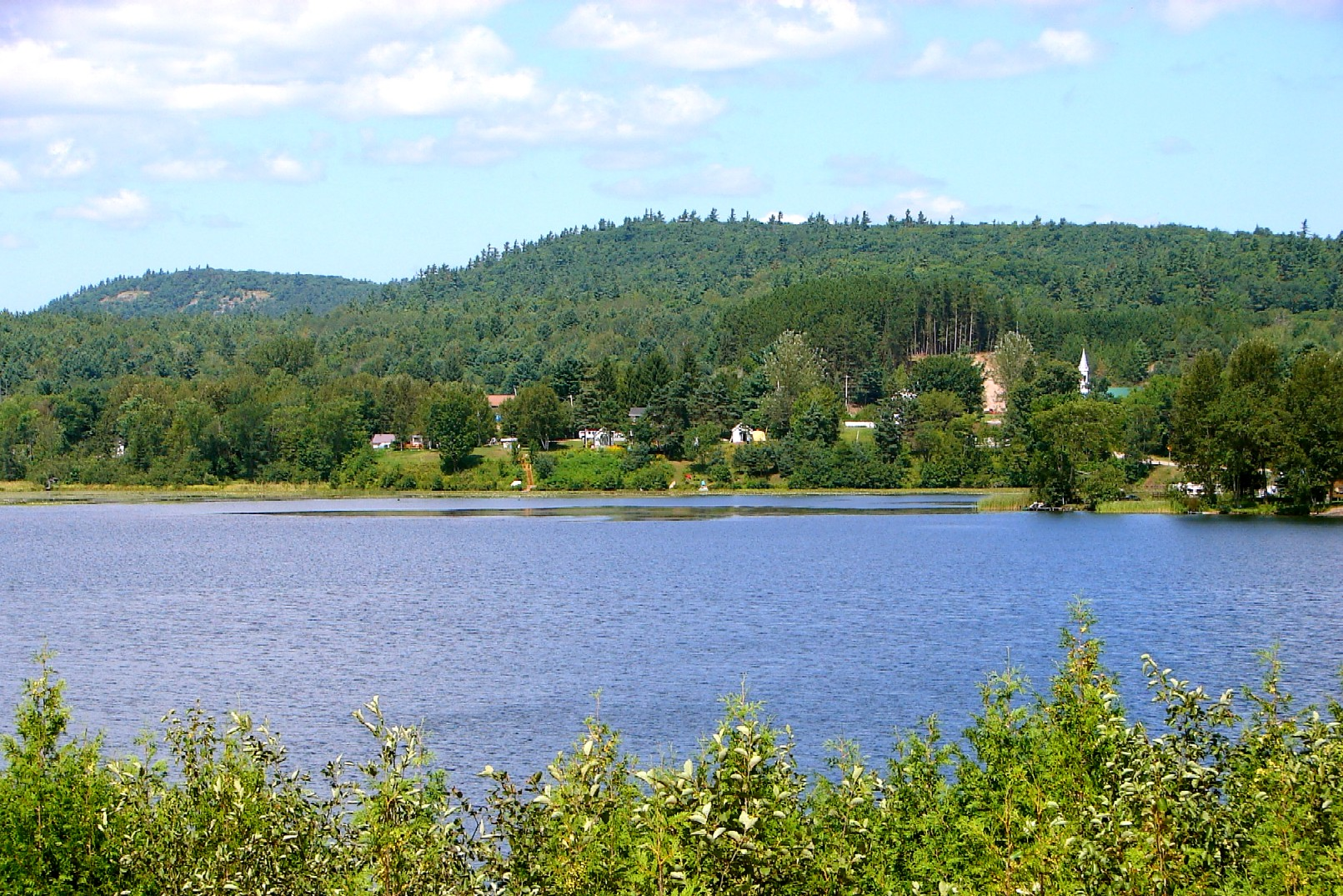
- Denbigh and Denbigh Lake

- Location within Southern Ontario
- Coordinates: 45°00′N 77°15′W
- Country: Canada
- Province: Ontario
- County: Lennox and Addington
- Formed: January 1, 1998

Government
  - Type: Township
  - Reeve: Henry Hogg
  - Governing Body: Addington Highlands Township Council
  - MP: Shelby Kramp-Neuman
  - MPP: Ric Bresee

Area
  - Land: 1,293.99 km^{2} (499.61 sq mi)

Population (2021)
  - Total: 2,534
  - Density: 2/km^{2} (5.2/sq mi)
- Time zone: UTC-5 (EST)
  - Summer (DST): UTC-4 (EDT)
- Postal code FSA: K0H
- Area code: 613
- Website: www.addingtonhighlands.ca

Addington Highlands is a township in central eastern Ontario, Canada, in the County of Lennox and Addington. Bon Echo Provincial Park is located primarily in Addington Highlands.

== History ==
Addington Highlands was formed on January 1, 1998, through the amalgamation of the Township of Kaladar, Anglesea and Effingham with the Township of Denbigh, Abinger and Ashby.

This area was first settled following the construction of the Addington Road in 1857. It was originally named Scouten after its first postmaster. The old CPR rail bed passing through the town has become part of the Trans Canada Trail.

== Geography ==
=== Communities ===
Addington Highlands Township comprises the communities of:

- Addington
- Bishop Corners
- Caverlys Landing
- Cloyne
- Denbigh
- Ferguson Corners
- Flinton
- Flinton Corners
- Glastonbury
- Glenfield
- Kaladar
- Massanoga
- McCrae
- Northbrook
- Rose Hill
- Slate Falls
- Vennachar
- Vennachar Junction
- Weslemkoon

The township's municipal offices are located in Flinton. Kaladar is located at the junction of Highway 7 and Highway 41.

=== Lakes ===
Lakes of notable size within the township boundaries are:

- Ashby Lake
- Ashby White Lake
- Barker Lake
- Brooks Lake
- Browns Lake
- Deerock Lake
- Denbigh Lake
- Effingham Lake
- Joeperry Lake
- Long Malloy Lake
- Mazinaw Lake
- Otter Lake
- Lake Sheldrake
- Shabomeka Lake
- Skootamatta Lake
- Weslemkoon Lake
- Trout Lake

== Demographics ==
In the 2021 Census of Population conducted by Statistics Canada, Addington Highlands had a population of 2,534 living in 1,122 of its 2,052 total private dwellings, a change of 9.3% from its 2016 population of 2,318. With a land area of 1,293.99 km^{2} (499.61 sq mi), it had a population density of 2.0/km^{2} (5.1/sq mi) in 2021.

Historical census populations

Year	Pop.	±%
1976	2,002	—
1981	1,878	−6.2%
1986	2,069	+10.2%
1991	2,193	+6.0%
1996	2,429	+10.8%

Year	Pop.	±%
2001	2,402	−1.1%
2006	2,512	+4.6%
2011	2,517	+0.2%
2016	2,323	−7.7%
2021	2,534	+9.1%

Population amounts prior to 1998 are sum of Denbigh Abinger and Ashby Township and Kaladar Anglesea and Effingham Township.
Source: Statistics Canada

== Parks and recreation ==
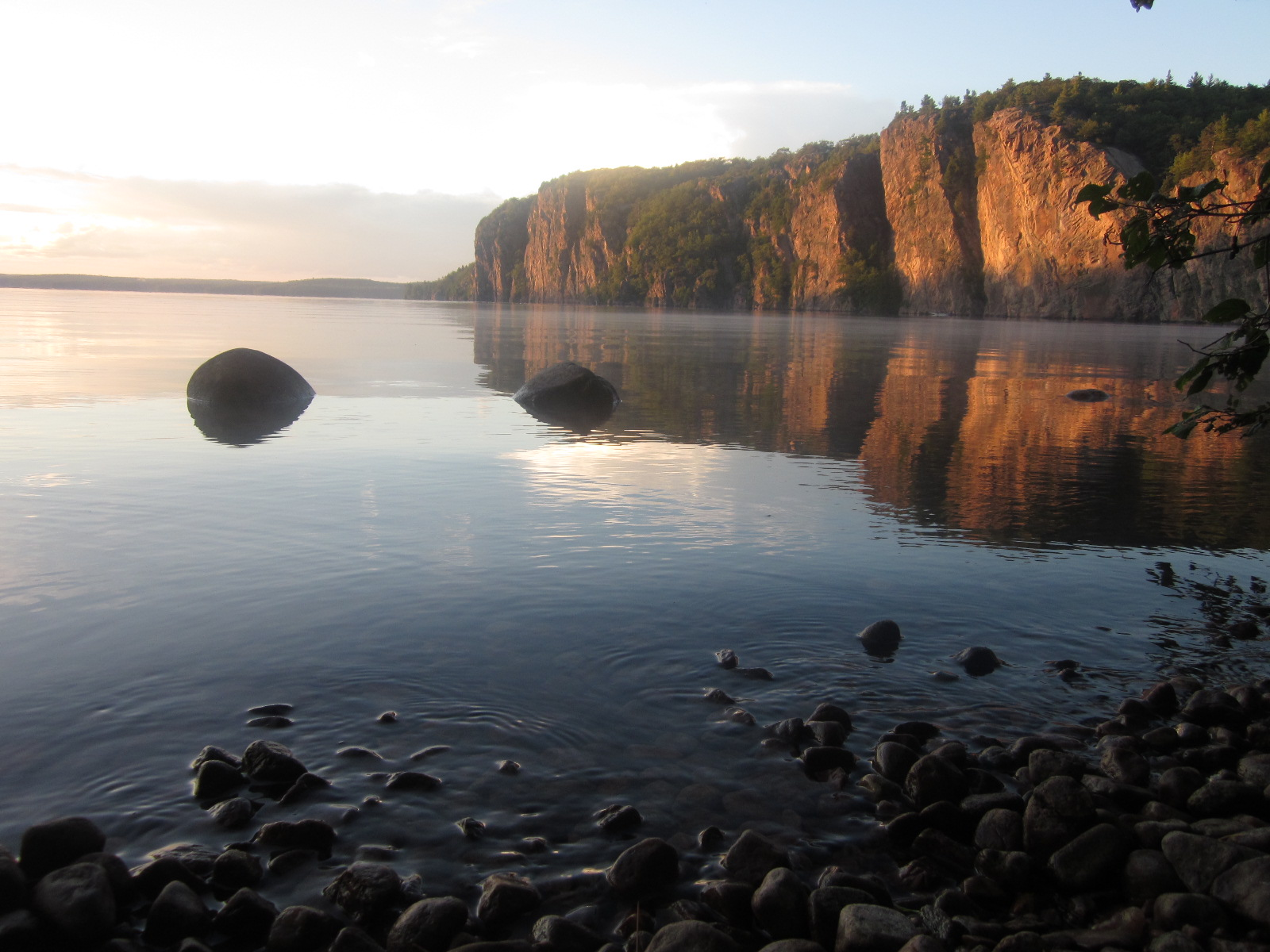
Bon Echo Provincial Park, Mazinaw Rock

Addington Highlands contains the Kaladar Pine Barrens Conservation Reserve and the majority of Bon Echo Provincial Park.

== See also ==
- List of municipalities in Ontario
- List of townships in Ontario
