= Lennox and Addington County =

- County (upper-tier)
- County of Lennox and Addington
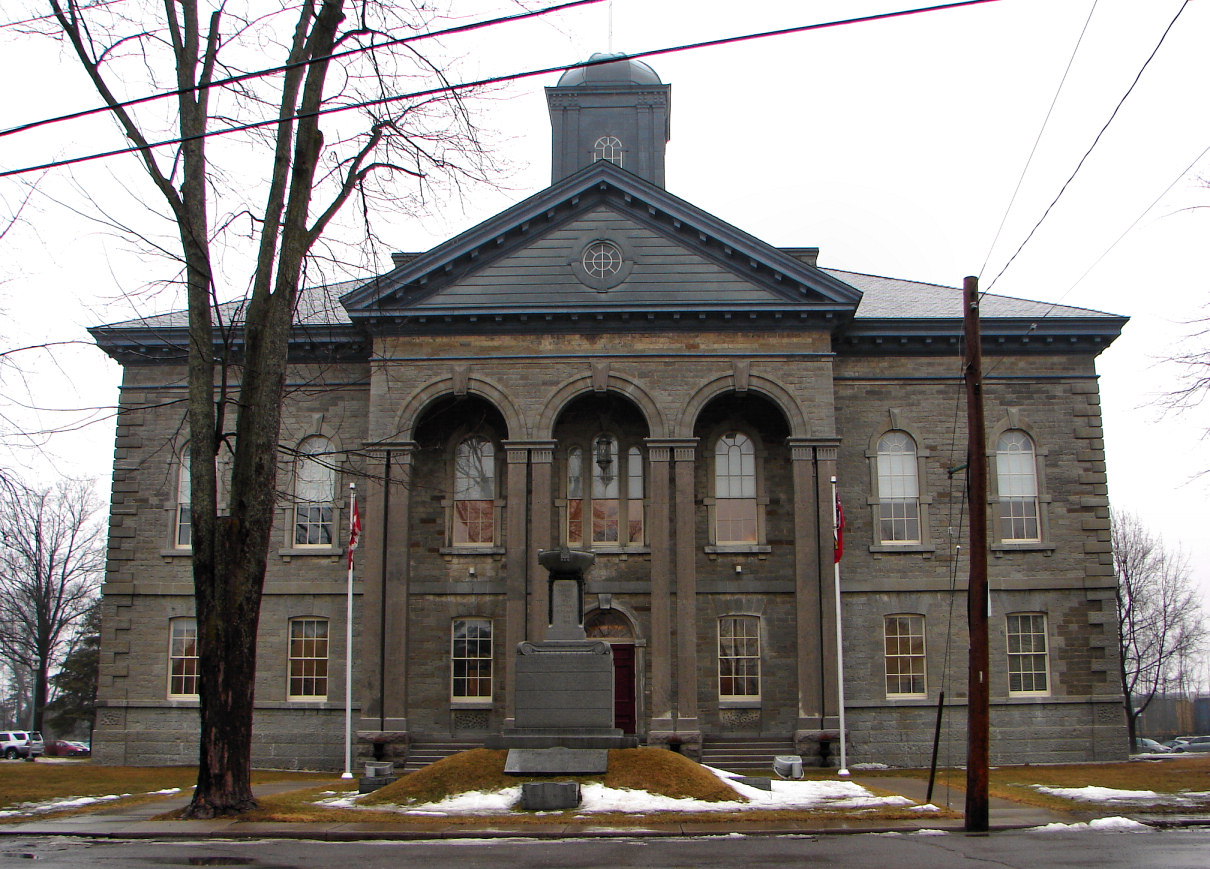
- Lennox & Addington County Courthouse

- Location of Lennox and Addington County
- Coordinates: 44°40′N 77°10′W
- Country: Canada
- Province: Ontario
- County seat: Greater Napanee
- Municipalities: List: Town of Greater Napanee; Township of Addington Highlands; Township of Loyalist; Township of Stone Mills

Area
  - Land: 2,792.72 km^{2} (1,078.28 sq mi)

Population (2021)
  - Total: 45,182
  - Density: 16.2/km^{2} (42/sq mi)
- Time zone: UTC-5 (EST)
  - Summer (DST): UTC-4 (EDT)
- Website: www.lennox-addington.on.ca

Lennox and Addington County is a county and census division of the Canadian province of Ontario. The county seat is Greater Napanee. It is located in the subregion of Southern Ontario named Eastern Ontario.

Around the middle of the 19th century, the Addington Road was built by the province to encourage settlement in the northern sections of the county.

== Historical evolution ==
The two original counties of Lennox and Addington, respectively named after Charles Lennox, 3rd Duke of Richmond and Henry Addington, 1st Viscount Sidmouth, were organized for electoral purposes in 1792, and were situated within the Mecklenburg District. Mecklenburg was renamed as the "Midland District" in 1792.

In 1798, the Parliament of Upper Canada passed legislation to provide, that, at the beginning of 1800:

... the townships of Ernest Town, Fredericksburg, Adolphustown, Richmond, Camden (distinguished by being called Camden East), Amherst Island and Sheffield, do constitute and form the incorporated counties of Lenox and Addington.

In 1821, the newly surveyed township of Kaladar was added to the counties.

In 1845, the counties regained their separate identities, but still remained united for electoral purposes. The newly surveyed township of Anglesea was added to Addington at that time.

Fredericksburgh Township had been settled in 1784, and officially separated into North Fredericksburgh and South Fredericksburgh in 1857.

At the beginning of 1850, Midland District was abolished, and the United Counties of Frontenac, Lennox and Addington replaced it for municipal and judicial purposes. In 1860, Lennox and Addington were formally amalgamated as the County of Lennox and Addington, and declared to be the junior county in the United Counties. The townships of Effingham, Abinger, Ashby and Denbigh were added to the county at the same time.

Upon the dissolution of the United Counties at the beginning of 1865, the county became separate from Frontenac for all purposes.

In the late 1990s, the county's municipalities were reorganized to form the town of Greater Napanee and the townships of Addington Highlands, Loyalist, and Stone Mills.

== Demographics ==
As a census division in the 2021 Census of Population conducted by Statistics Canada, Lennox and Addington County had a population of 45,182 living in 17,891 of its 20,094 total private dwellings, a change of 5.4% from its 2016 population of 42,883. With a land area of 2,792.72 km^{2} (1,078.28 sq mi), it had a population density of 16.2/km^{2} (41.9/sq mi) in 2021.

Canada census – Lennox and Addington community profile

	2021	2016	2011
Population	45,182 (+5.4% from 2016)	42,888 (+2.6% from 2011)	41,824 (+3.2% from 2006)
Land area	2,792.72 km^{2} (1,078.28 sq mi)	2,839.68 km^{2} (1,096.41 sq mi)	2,841.10 km^{2} (1,096.95 sq mi)
Population density	16.2/km^{2} (42/sq mi)	15.1/km^{2} (39/sq mi)	14.7/km^{2} (38/sq mi)
Median age	48.0 (M: 46.4, F: 49.6)	47.2 (M: 46.3, F: 48.3)
Private dwellings	20,094 (total) 17,891 (occupied)	19,684 (total) 17,053 (occupied)	18,295 (total)
Median household income	$85,000	$71,725

References: 2021 2016 2011

Lennox and Addington County population history

Year	Pop.	±%
1921	18,994	—
1931	18,883	−0.6%
1941	18,469	−2.2%
1951	19,544	+5.8%
1956	21,611	+10.6%
1961	23,717	+9.7%

Year	Pop.	±%
1966	25,202	+6.3%
1971	28,359	+12.5%
1976	32,633	+15.1%
1981	33,040	+1.2%
1986	34,354	+4.0%
1991	37,243	+8.4%

Year	Pop.	±%
1996	39,206	+5.3%
2001	39,461	+0.7%
2006	40,542	+2.7%
2011	41,824	+3.2%
2016	42,888	+2.5%
2021	45,182	+5.3%

Source: Statistics Canada

== Notable inhabitants ==
- Charles Jones, composer
- Terence Dickinson, awards-winning astronomy author and expert in astrophotography
- Avril Lavigne, musician
- Daniel Woolf, historian and former principal of Queen's University

== See also ==
- List of municipalities in Ontario
- List of Ontario Census Divisions
- List of townships in Ontario
- List of secondary schools in Ontario § Lennox and Addington County
