= Opeongo Hills =

Range of hills in Southern Ontario, Canada

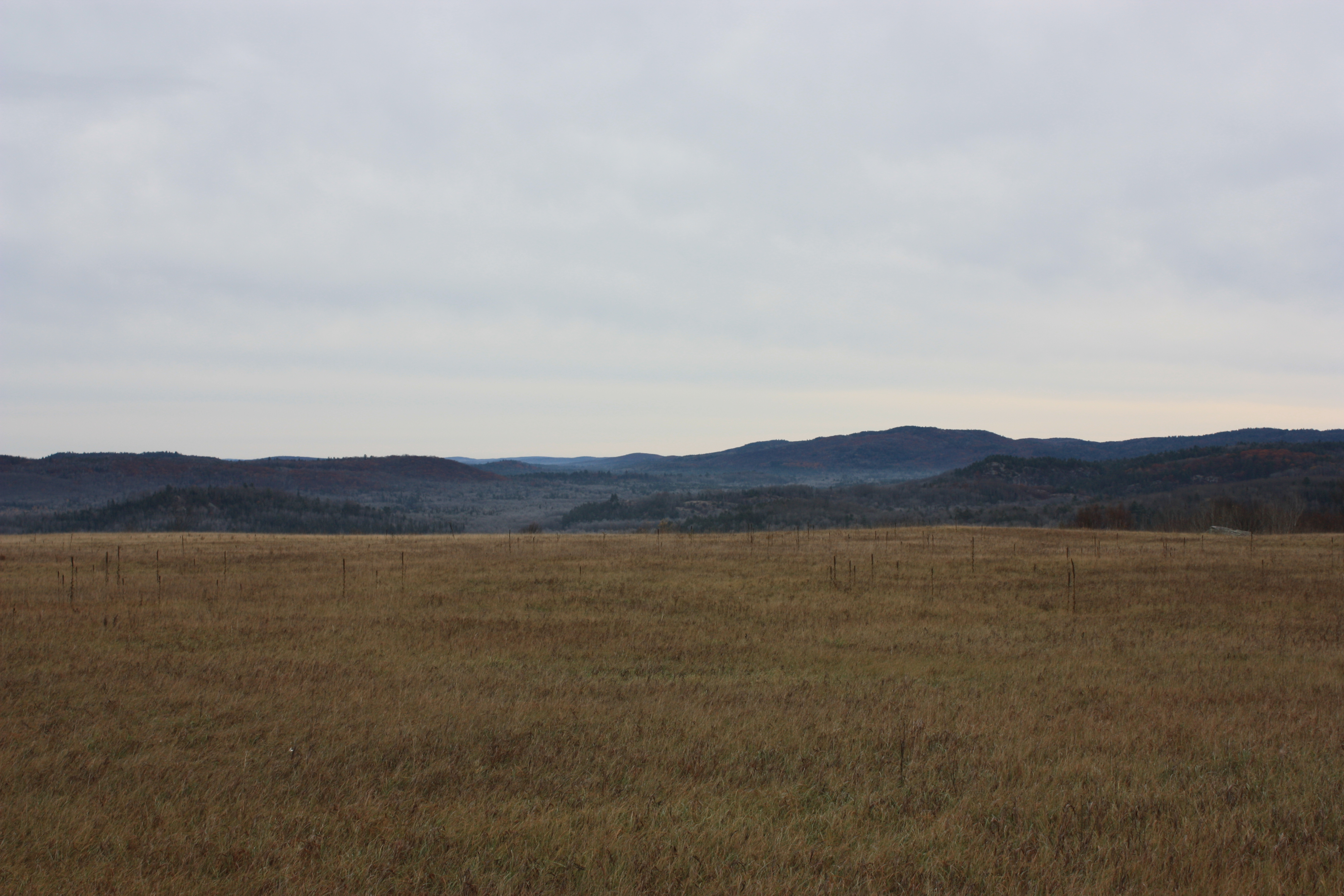
- Opeongo Hills near Boulter, Ontario.

Highest point
- Peak: Unmarked point
- Elevation: 586 m (1,923 ft)

Geography
- Location within Southern Ontario
- Country: Canada
- Province: Eastern Ontario
- Range coordinates: 45°30′N 77°40′W

The Opeongo Hills (sometimes called the Opeongo Mountains or Madawaska Highlands, particularly for the easternmost hills) are a range of hills in Southern Ontario, near Algonquin Provincial Park. The hills stretch from Opeongo Lake in Algonquin Park in the west, along the Madawaska and Opeongo Rivers, towards the Opeongo Colonization Road, and extending towards the Deacon Escarpment (north of Killaloe, Ontario in Renfrew County), Bonnechere, Ontario, and Dacre in the east. To the east of the Opeongo Hills lie the Madawaska River valley, the Mississippi River Valley, and the Ottawa-Bonnechere Graben along the Ottawa River. Its tallest peak is roughly 7 km northeast of Highway 60. At roughly 586 meters, it is the tallest point in Southern Ontario. The community of Foymount (along the former Highway 512, the Opeongo Line) is one of the highest settlements in Southern Ontario.

The Opeongo Hills are a continuation of the Laurentian Highlands, which extend into Eastern Ontario, towards Gananoque, and across the Ottawa River Valley into Quebec, and the Laurentian Mountains, which continue parallel to the St. Lawrence River, north of Montreal, Trois-Rivières and Quebec City.

The geography in this area of Central Ontario is dotted with rolling hills and forests with streams, lakes, and small waterfalls, typical of a place in the Canadian Shield.

The first European explorer to visit the region is Samuel de Champlain, in 1615, while exploring the area with the Wendat (Huron) natives. When settlers first started arriving in the area in the late 1790s and early 19th century, land areas were given to settlers by the Canadian Land and Emigration Company for settlement and farming. The soils of the area were not perfectly suited for farming, but small-scale agriculture was able to be conducted on the land. Today, the Opeongo Hills are crossed by many provincial highways, many of which still follow the original Historic Colonization Roads.

== Municipalities located in the Opeongo Hills ==
Below is a list of communities and municipalities located in the Opeongo Hills, from west to east

=== Haliburton County ===
- Minden Hills
  - Minden, Ontario
- Algonquin Highlands
- Dysart, Bruton, Clyde, Dudley, Eyre, Guilford, Harburn, Harcourt and Havelock
  - Haliburton, Ontario
- Highland East

=== Nipissing District ===
- South Algonquin, Ontario
  - Madawaska
  - Whitney

=== Hastings County ===
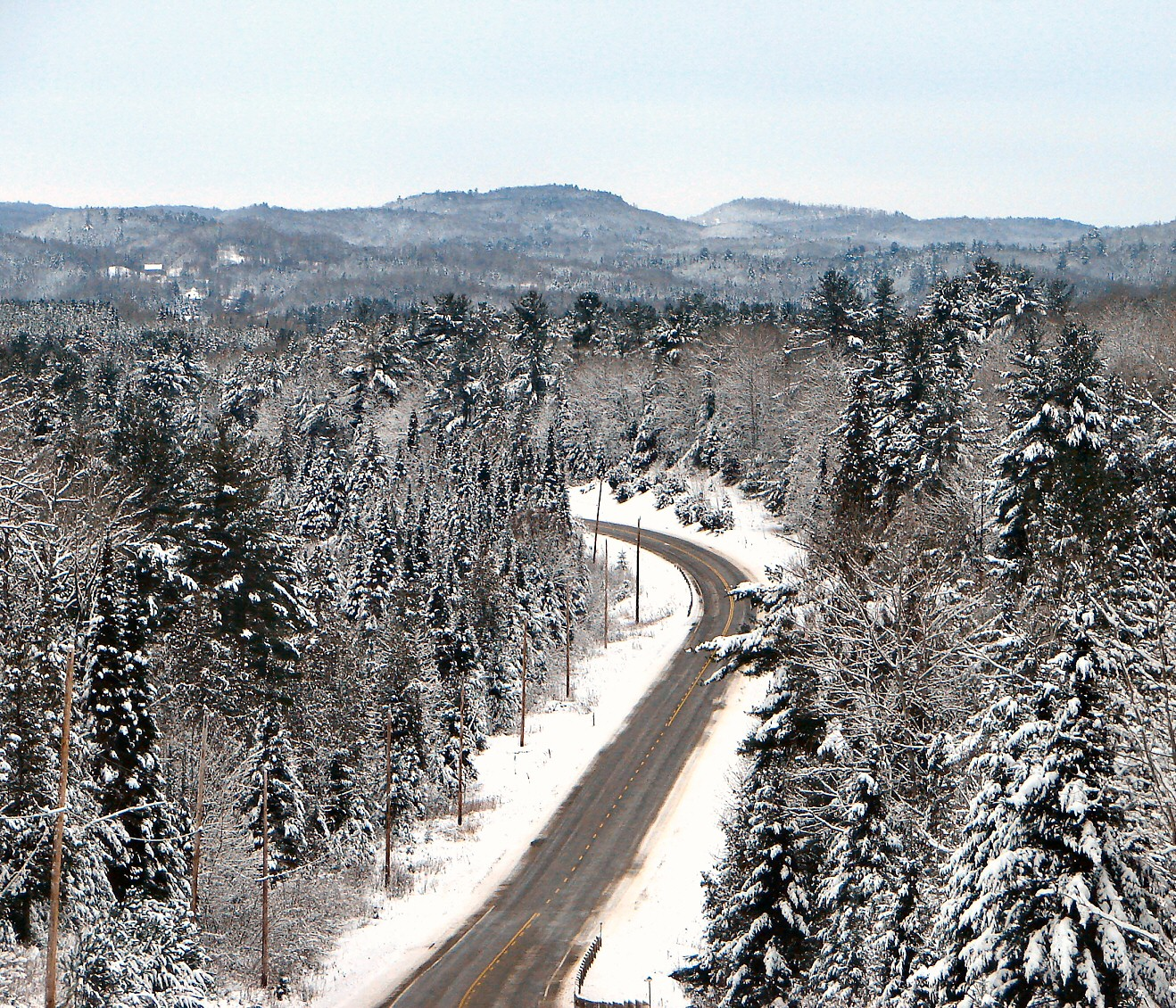
The northern portion of Hastings County is characterized by the Opeongo Hills

- Faraday
- Bancroft
- Carlow/Mayo
- Hastings Highlands, Ontario
  - Maynooth

=== Frontenac County ===
- Frontenac County
  - North Frontenac

=== Lennox and Addington County ===
- Addington Highlands

=== Renfrew County ===
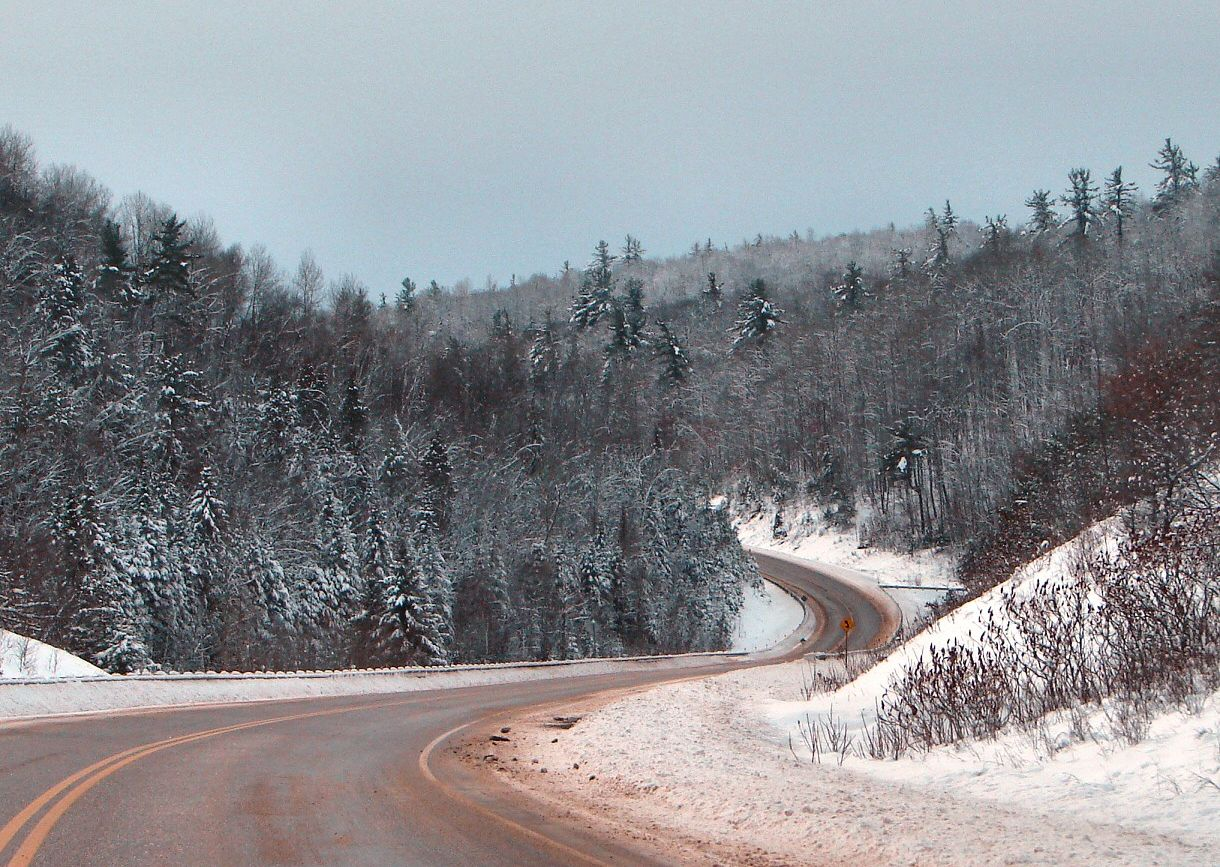
Highway 41 winding through the Madawaska Highlands in Renfrew County.

- Madawaska Valley, Ontario
  - Barry's Bay
  - Combermere
- Brudenell, Lyndoch and Raglan
  - Craigmont
  - Quadeville
- Killaloe, Hagarty and Richards
  - Bonnechere, Ontario
  - Wilno, Ontario
- Laurentian Valley
- North Algona-Wilberforce
- Bonnechere Valley
  - Eganville
  - Hyndford
  - Balaclava
- Greater Madawaska
  - Calabogie

=== Lanark County ===
- Lanark Highlands

== Lakes and rivers ==
- Bark Lake
- Bonnechere River
- Lake Clear
- Constant Lake
- Lake Doré
- Golden Lake
- Kamaniskeg Lake
- Little Mississippi River
- Madawaska River
- Meadow Lake
- Mississippi River (eastern boundary of the Hills)
- Opeongo Lake
- Opeongo River
- Papineau Lake
- Snake River (Renfrew County)
- Round Lake
- York River

== Parks ==
Below is a list of Conservation areas, Provincial and National parks located in the Opeongo Hills

- Algonquin Provincial Park
- Bell Bay Provincial Park
- Bon Echo Provincial Park
- Bonnechere Provincial Park
- Bonnechere River Provincial Park
- Centennial Lake Provincial Park
- Conroys Marsh Provincial Conservation Reserve
- Constant Creek Swamp and Fen Provincial Conservation Reserve
- Deacon Escarpment Provincial Conservation Reserve
- Dividing Lake Provincial Nature Preserve
- Foy Provincial Park
- Egan Chutes Provincial Park
- Lake St. Peter Provincial Park
- Little Mississippi River Provincial Conservation Reserve
- Matawatchan Provincial Park
- North Frontenac Park Lands
- Opeongo River Provincial Park
- Silent Lake Provincial Park
- Upper Madawaska River Provincial Park

== Roads ==
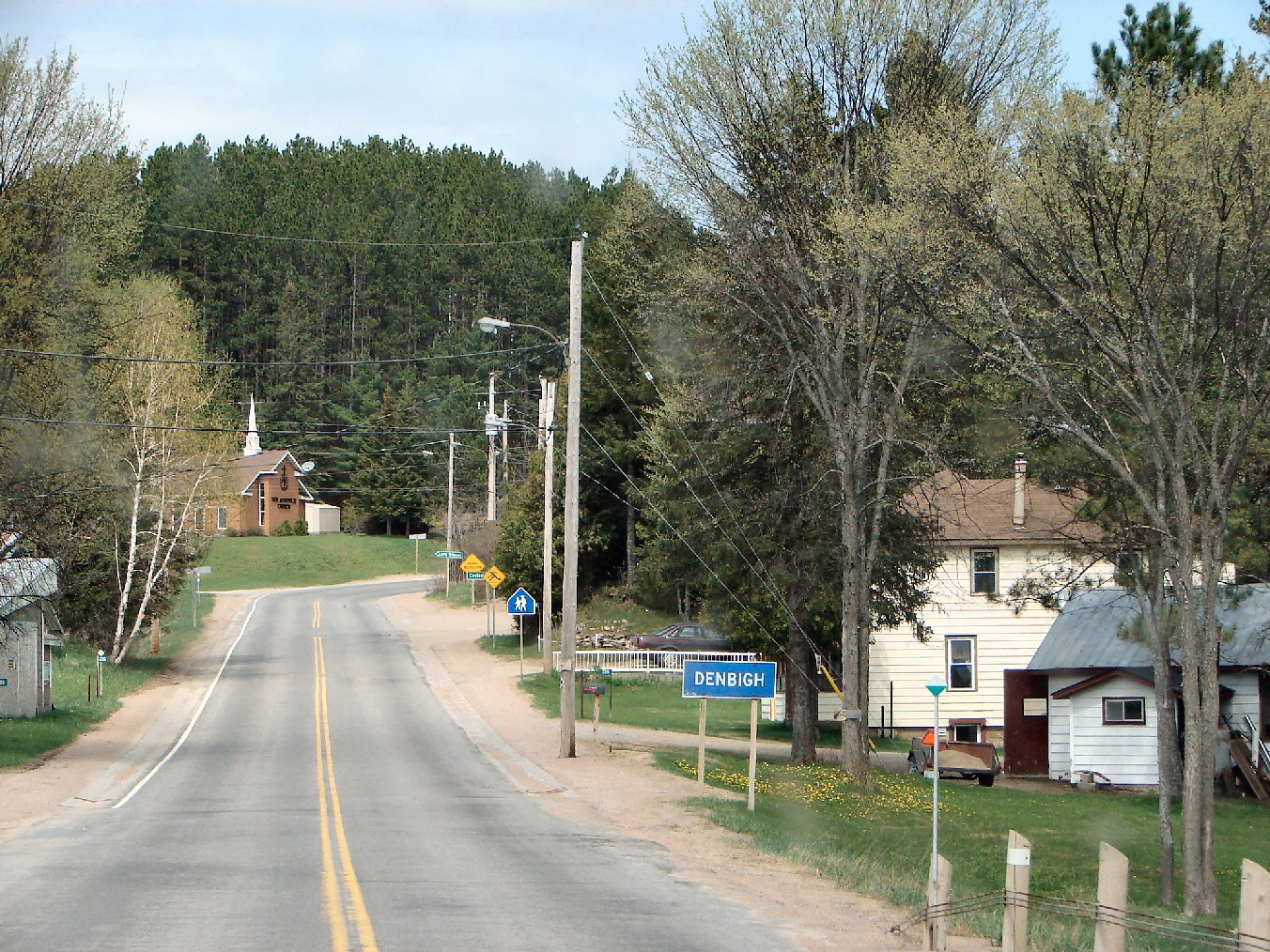
The north-eastern end of Highway 28 in Denbigh.

Roads that cross the Opeongo Hills include:

- Highway 28 (part)
- Highway 41
- Highway 60
- Highway 62 (part)
- Highway 127
- Highway 132

== Notable attractions ==
- Balaclava ghost town
- Art Gallery of Bancroft
- Opeongo Mountains Resort, in Eganville
- Bonnechere Caves, near Fourth Chute
- Quadeville is home to a cottage once owned by famed gangster Al Capone. It still stands to this day north of the hamlet near a ghost town called Letterkenny.
- Near the intersection of Highways 41 and Highway 132 is a spot known as "Magnetic Hill", where the road slopes uphill but appears to be going downhill.
- Mount Pakenham Ski Resort, near Pakenham, Ontario
- Calabogie Peaks Ski Resort
