= Killaloe, Hagarty and Richards =

- Township (lower-tier)
- Township of Killaloe, Hagarty and Richards
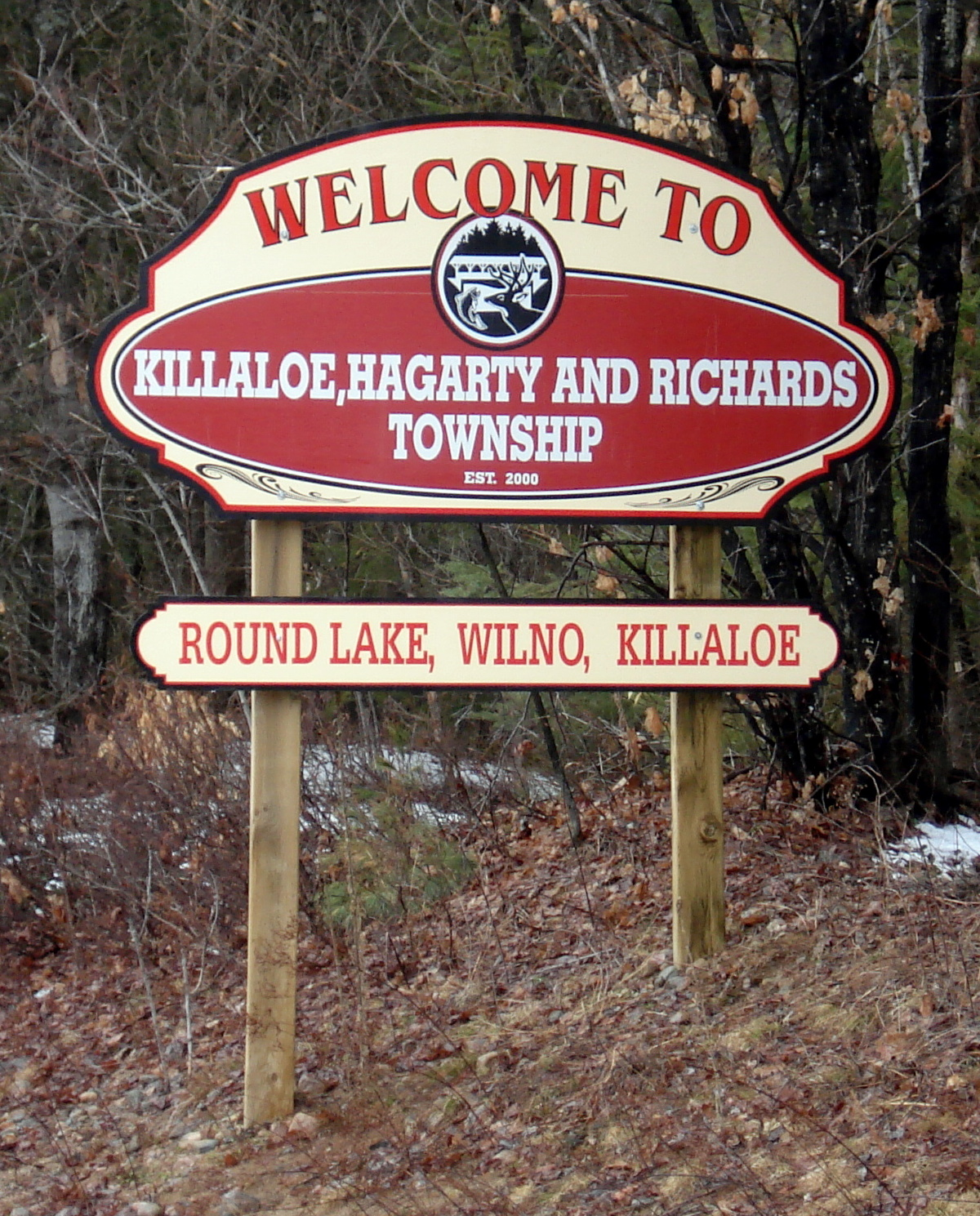
- Welcome sign on Round Lake Road

- Location within Renfrew County Location within Southern Ontario
- Coordinates: 45°36′N 77°30′W
- Country: Canada
- Province: Ontario
- County: Renfrew
- Established: January 1, 2000

Government
  - Mayor: David Mayville
  - Federal riding: Algonquin—Renfrew—Pembroke
  - Prov. riding: Renfrew—Nipissing—Pembroke

Area
  - Land: 391.60 km^{2} (151.20 sq mi)

Population (2021)
  - Total: 2,410
  - Density: 6.2/km^{2} (16/sq mi)
- Time zone: UTC−5 (EST)
  - Summer (DST): UTC−4 (EDT)
- Postal code: K0J 2A0
- Area codes: 613, 343
- Website: www.killaloe-hagarty-richards.ca

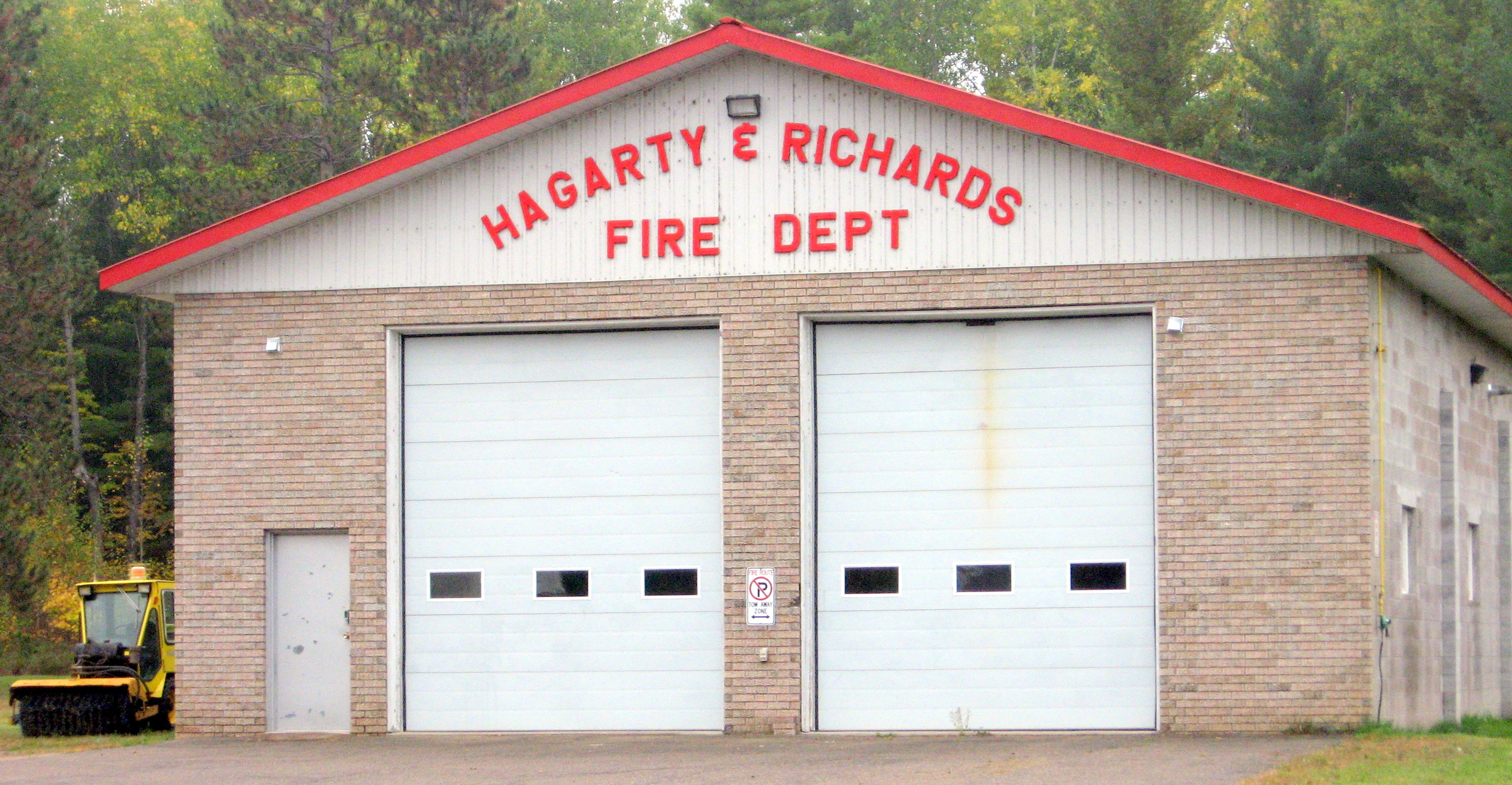
A branch of the township fire department in Round Lake Centre

Killaloe, Hagarty and Richards is an incorporated township in Renfrew County in eastern Ontario, Canada, created on July 1, 2000, as a result of an amalgamation of the Township of Hagarty and Richards with the Village of Killaloe.

== Communities ==
The township comprises the smaller communities of Bonnechere, Killaloe, Round Lake Centre and Wilno.

== Demographics ==
In the 2021 Census of Population conducted by Statistics Canada, Killaloe, Hagarty and Richards had a population of 2,410 living in 1,097 of its 1,559 total private dwellings, a change of −0.4% from its 2016 population of 2,420. With a land area of 391.6 km^{2} (151.2 sq mi), it had a population density of 6.2/km^{2} (15.9/sq mi) in 2021.

Canada census – Killaloe, Hagarty and Richards community profile

	2021	2016	2011
Population	2,410 (-0.4% from 2016)	2420 (0.7% from 2011)	2402 (-5.8% from 2006)
Land area	391.60 km^{2} (151.20 sq mi)	396.80 km^{2} (153.21 sq mi)	395.98 km^{2} (152.89 sq mi)
Population density	6.2/km^{2} (16/sq mi)	6.1/km^{2} (16/sq mi)	6.1/km^{2} (16/sq mi)
Median age	54.0 (M: 53.2, F: 55.2)	50.0 (M: 49.5, F: 50.6)	48.8 (M: 47.9, F: 49.6)
Private dwellings	1,559 (total) 1,097 (occupied)	1,689 (total) 1,063 (occupied)	1,523 (total) 1,043 (occupied)
Median household income	$63,200	$50,592

References: 2021 2016 2011

Historical census populations – Killaloe, Hagarty and Richards
Year	Pop.	±%
2001	2,492	—
2006	2,550	+2.3%
2011	2,402	−5.8%
2016	2,420	+0.7%
2021	2,410	−0.4%
Source: Statistics Canada

== Parks ==
- Bonnechere Provincial Park
- Bonnechere River Provincial Park
- Erskine Provincial Park
- Foy Provincial Park
- Killaloe Pathways Park
- Round Lake Park
- Sheryl Boyle Park, on Round Lake
- Station Park, in Killaloe
- Wilno Heritage Park

== Lakes and rivers ==
- Bonnechere River
- Pine River
- Golden Lake
- Round Lake

== Other features ==
- Killaloe/Bonnechere Airport

== See also ==
- List of townships in Ontario
