= Algonquins of Pikwàkanagàn First Nation =

Alonquin First Nation in Ontario, Canada

Coordinates: 45°33′N 77°13′W

Algonquins of Pikwakanagan First Nation
- Band No. 163
- Pikwàkanagàn Omàmiwininiwak
- People: Algonquin
- Headquarters: Bonnechere Valley
- Province: Ontario

Land
- Main reserve: Pikwakanagan
- Land area: 6.89 km^{2} (2.66 sq mi)

Population (2025)
- On reserve: 459
- On other land: 5
- Off reserve: 3931
- Total population: 4395

Government
- Chief: Gregory James Sarazin
- Council: 2023–2026: Dale Mary Joan Benoit; Joseph Patrick Donald Bilodeau; Sherry Lee Ann Kohoko; Mervin Matthew Sarazin; Mary Vicky Kwawenron Two-Axe; Patrick John Leroux

Website
- www.algonquinsofpikwakanagan.com

Algonquins of Pikwàkanagàn First Nation (Algonquin: Pikwàkanagàn Omàmiwininiwak), formerly known as the Golden Lake First Nation, is an Algonquin First Nation in Ontario, Canada. Their territory is located in the former township of South Algona (now part of Bonnechere Valley) in the Ottawa Valley on Golden Lake.

As of March 2025, the registered population of the First Nation was 4,395 people, of which only 459 on reserve.

== Reserve ==
The First Nation have reserved for themselves the Pikwakanagan Indian Reserve, formerly known as Golden Lake 39 Indian Reserve. Their reserve of 688.8 hectares (1,702 acres) is adjacent to the hamlet of Golden Lake which is located between the villages of Killaloe and Eganville, about 40 kilometres (25 mi) south of Pembroke. The land straddles the south shores of Golden Lake and the Bonnechere River.

== See also ==
- Lisa Meness, Former Chief of the Algonquins of Pikwàkanagàn First Nation
