= Round Lake (Ontario) =

Lake in Killaloe, Hagarty and Richards, Ontario, Canada

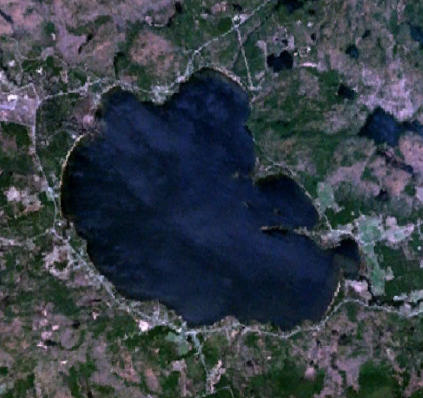
- Satellite picture

- Location within Ontario
- Location: Ontario
- Coordinates: 45°38′N 77°32′W
- Primary inflows: Bonnechere River, Sherwood River, Turner Creek, Reserve Creek, Jack's Creek
- Primary outflows: Bonnechere River
- Basin countries: Canada
- Max. depth: 55 m (180 ft)
- Islands: Victoria Island, Edwards Island, Idylwild Island (all Islands on Round Lake are privately owned)

Round Lake is a lake located in Killaloe, Hagarty and Richards Township, Renfrew County, Ontario, Canada. The Bonnechere River flows into the lake in the northwest and flows out of the lake at the southeast.

There are two provincial parks on the lake, Bonnechere Provincial Park on the northwestern shore and Foy Provincial Park on the eastern shore.

In the mid-1920s Hydro constructed a dam on the Bonnechere River downstream from the lake and upstream from the Tramore bridge at 45°37′13″N 77°27′36″W (opposite side of the lake from Round Lake Resort) and flooded the land around the lake. The edge of the lake before the rise in water level was about 75 yards out from our present shore.

Round Lake is the first major lake in the course of the Bonnechere River which begins at Mckaskill Lake in Algonquin Park to the north, and passes through Golden Lake, Eganville, Douglas and Renfrew before emptying into the Ottawa River near Castleford.
