= Bonnechere River Provincial Park =

Provincial park in Ontario, Canada

- IUCN category II (national park)
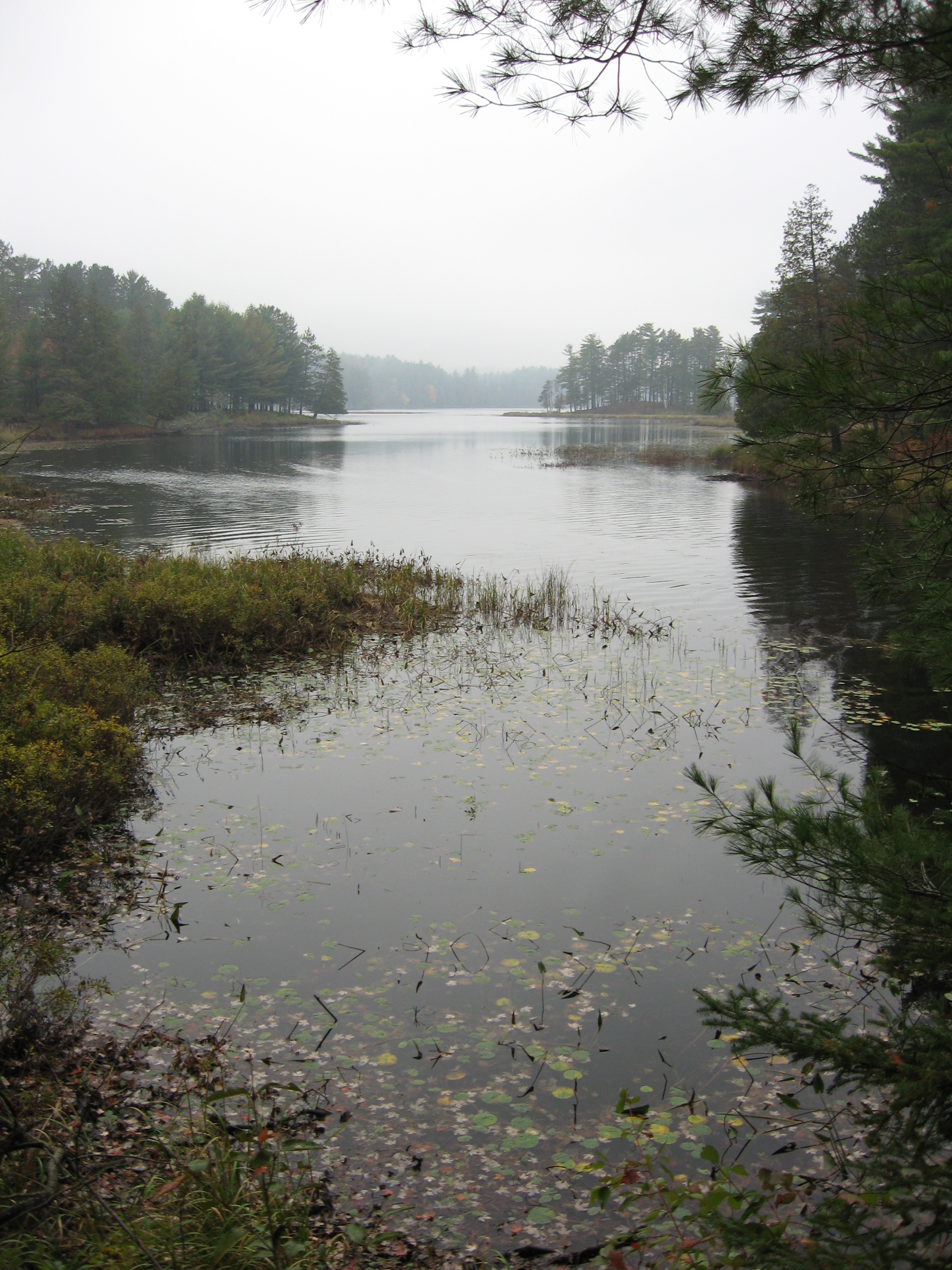
- White Mountain Narrows

- Location within Southern Ontario
- Location: Ontario, Canada
- Nearest city: Pembroke, Ontario
- Coordinates: 45°40′12″N 77°41′24″W
- Area: 11.98 km^{2} (4.63 sq mi)
- Established: 1986
- Governing body: Ontario Parks

Bonnechere River Provincial Park is located along the Bonnechere River in southern Ontario, Canada. A 23 km (14 mi) long section of the Bonnechere River, starting at the Algonquin Provincial Park boundary and terminating at Bonnechere Provincial Park, has been protected as a waterway provincial park. This scenic portion of the river is particularly suitable for canoe camping. It is a non-operating park, meaning no fees are charged and no staff are present with only a few services offered.
