= Foy Provincial Park =

Provincial park in Ontario, Canada

- IUCN category II (national park)
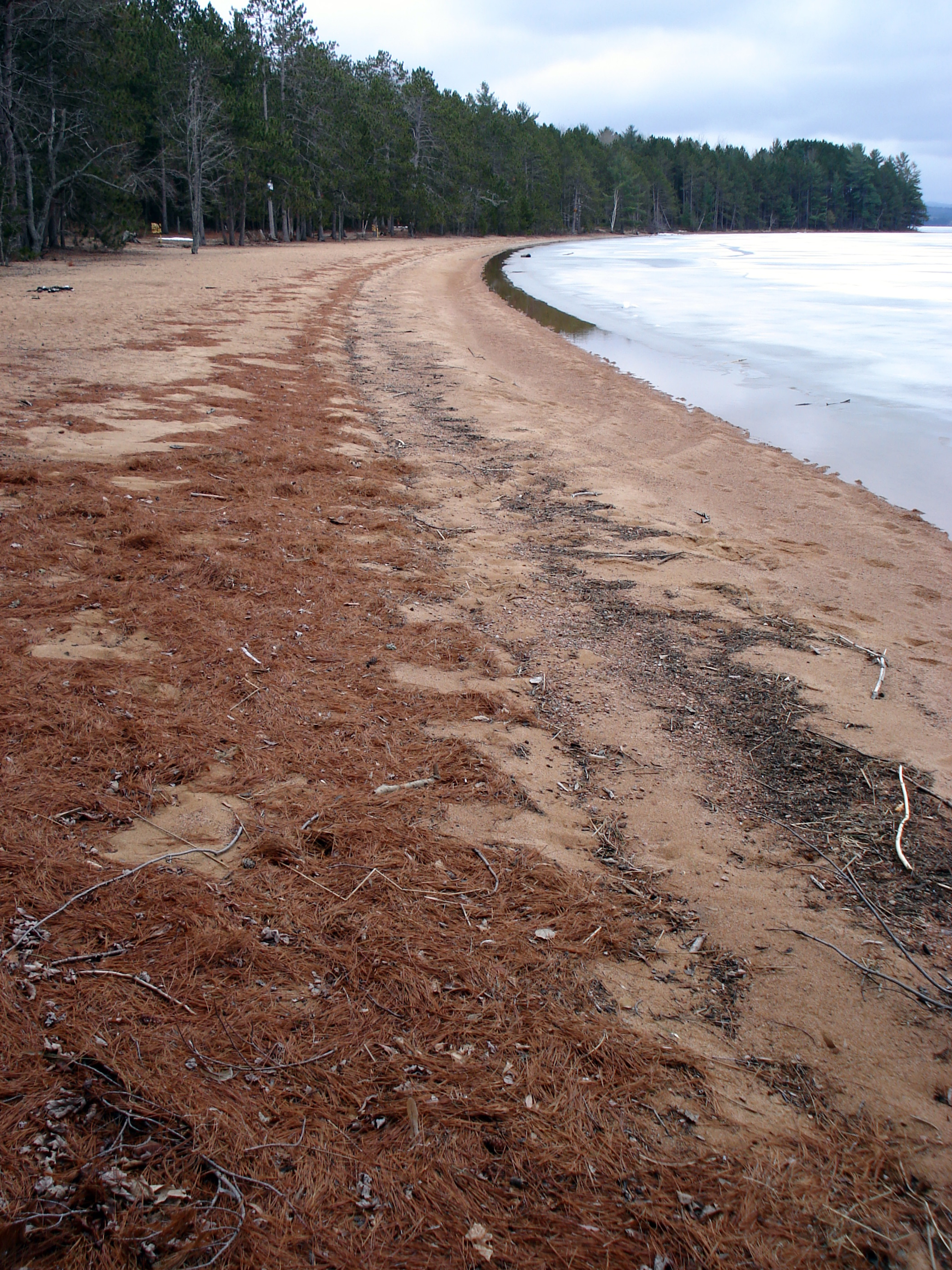
- The Foy beach in springtime.

- Location within Ontario
- Interactive map of Foy Provincial Park
- Location: Round Lake, Ontario
- Nearest city: Pembroke, Ontario
- Coordinates: 45.6504°N 77.5089°W
- Area: 48 ha (120 acres)
- Established: 1985
- Governing body: Ontario Parks

Foy Provincial Park is a provincial park on Round Lake in Ontario, Canada. Since it is non-operational, camping is prohibited, but day-use activities such as swimming and hiking are permitted. The park property includes facilities used by the Ontario Ranger program of the Ministry of Natural Resources.

== History ==
Purchased in 1968, the Foy property was originally an addition to Bonnechere Provincial Park, which is also located on Round Lake. As day use at Bonnechere Park became heavy in the early 1980s, the idea of creating another park on Round Lake was introduced. In 1985, it was put into regulation as Foy Provincial Park and designated as "recreation"-class. The stated goal of the park was to "maintain quality summer-oriented day use facilities".

Citing declining attendance, the Ministry of Natural Resources closed the day use facilities at Foy in 1994, along with seven other Ontario provincial parks. However, by 2024 the park had become extremely popular during the summer. This caused liability concerns with the local KHR municipal council and Round Lake property owners over safety with visitors crossing the road before accessing the park. In August 2025 on an average summer weekend over 50 vehicles could be found parked along Red Rock Road outside the Park's gate. Council is reviewing the possibility of opening up the park to vehicular access and creating a parking lot inside the park. This has sparked some controversy and opposition by a minority of residents who argue it would have an adverse environmental effect on the park.

For many years the Round Lake Ontario Ranger Program operated out of Foy park. The Ontario Ranger Program was suddenly cancelled completely by the Liberal Government in 2012. The portables used for the ranger camp were eventually removed from the site a decade later and replaced by an indigenous yurt owned by the Algonquin first Nation.

== Ecology ==
The 1986 management plan called for two nature reserve zones, one on the west side of the park's point to protect a "wave cut terrace that is the evidence of a glacial lake's existence". On the east side of the point, exposed clay made up the other reserve zone.While unauthorized use of off-road vehicles declined by the 2020s increased visitation by picnickers and families has increased stress on the local beach ecosystem.

To control and limit flooding to homes on Round Lake the outflow dam in Grassy Bay is opened annually on September 7th to lower the water levels in Round Lake. This has reduced the possibility of severe shoreline erosion and the undermining of tree roots by both flooding and ice damage.

Park officials have attempted to control activities by increasing regulatory signage, install garbage receptacles and a minority of privy boxes.

Nevertheless, the social and ecological carrying capacity of the park is currently under significant stress and local ecologist(s) argue that measures should be taken to limit the number of visitors. This is problematic as the park is non-operational and is classified for recreational use. The local municipality heavily market the park to attract outside visitors hoping to bring economic revenue for local businesses. Their objective is to encourage as many visitors as possible. This is incompatible with retaining the Park's ecological integrity.

== Gallery ==
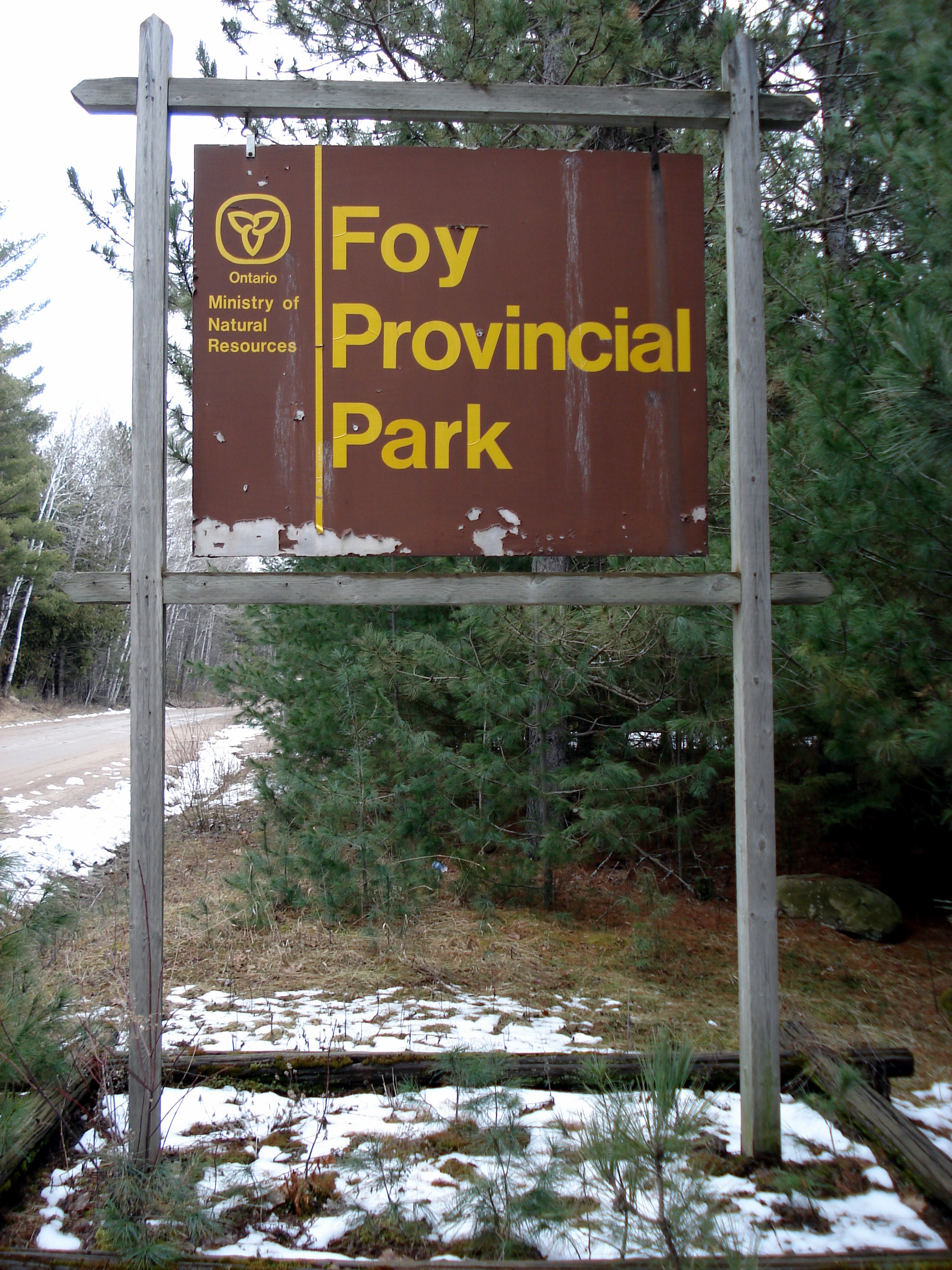
The main gate of the park.

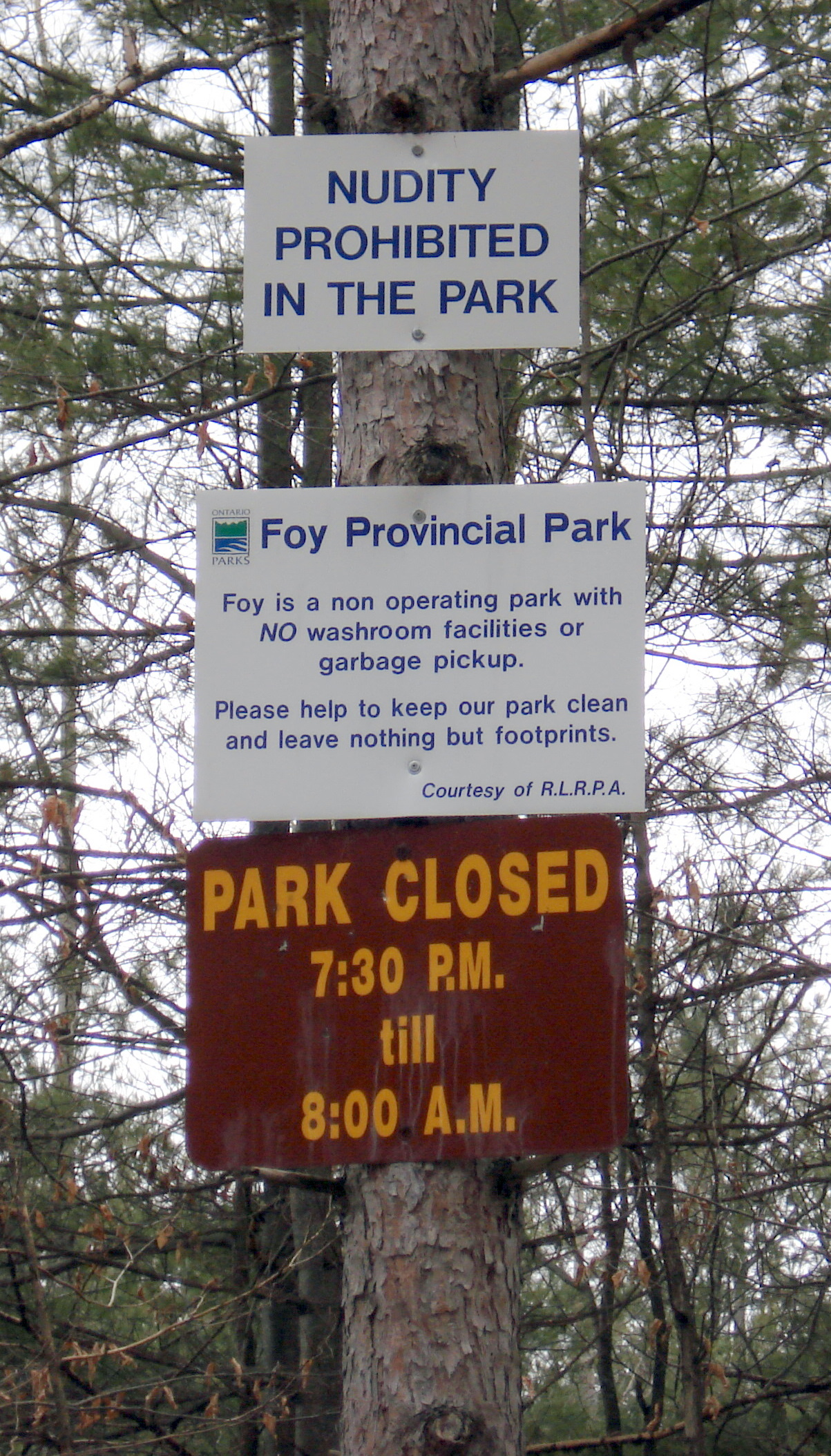
Signs displaying the park rules.

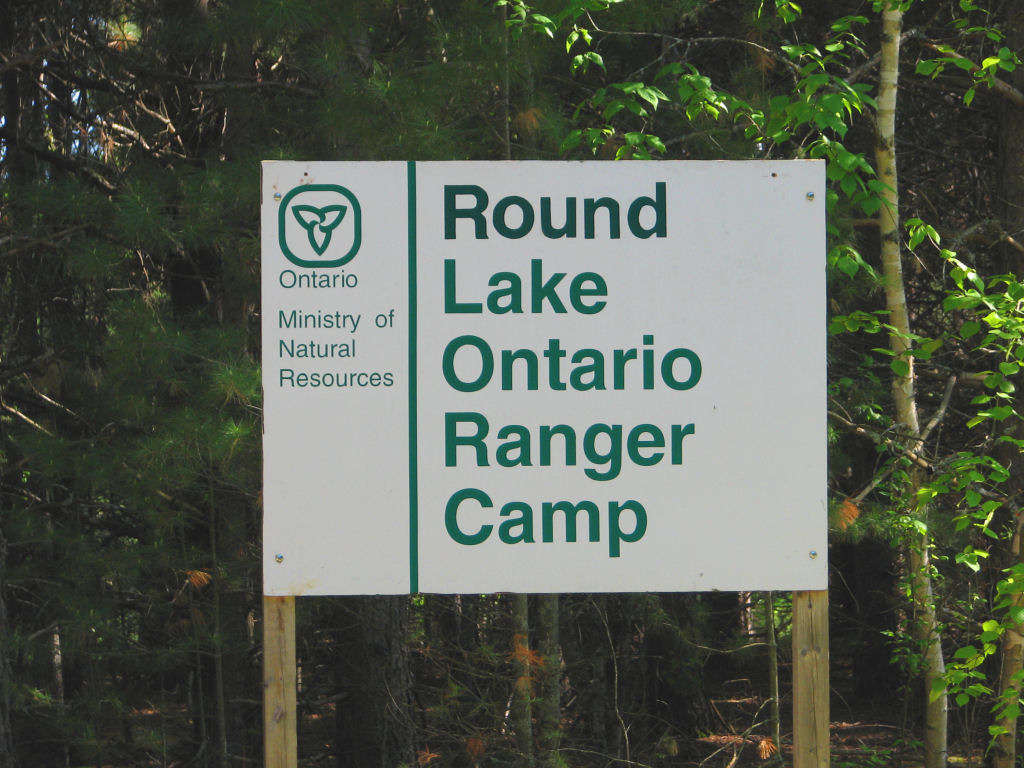
Ontario Ranger Camp sign.

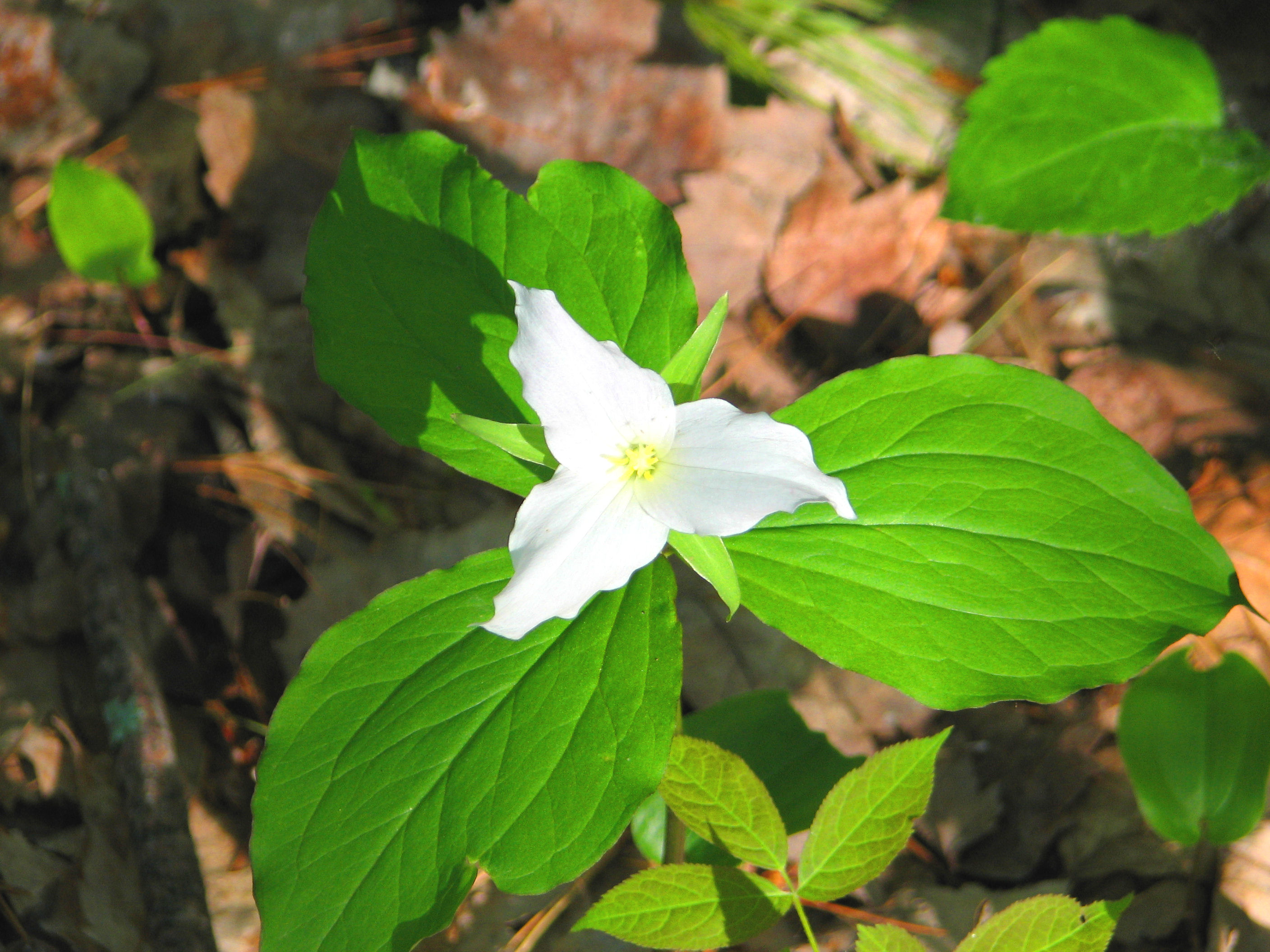
Great White Trillium (Trillium grandiflorum), Ontario's flower.

== See also ==
- List of Ontario parks
