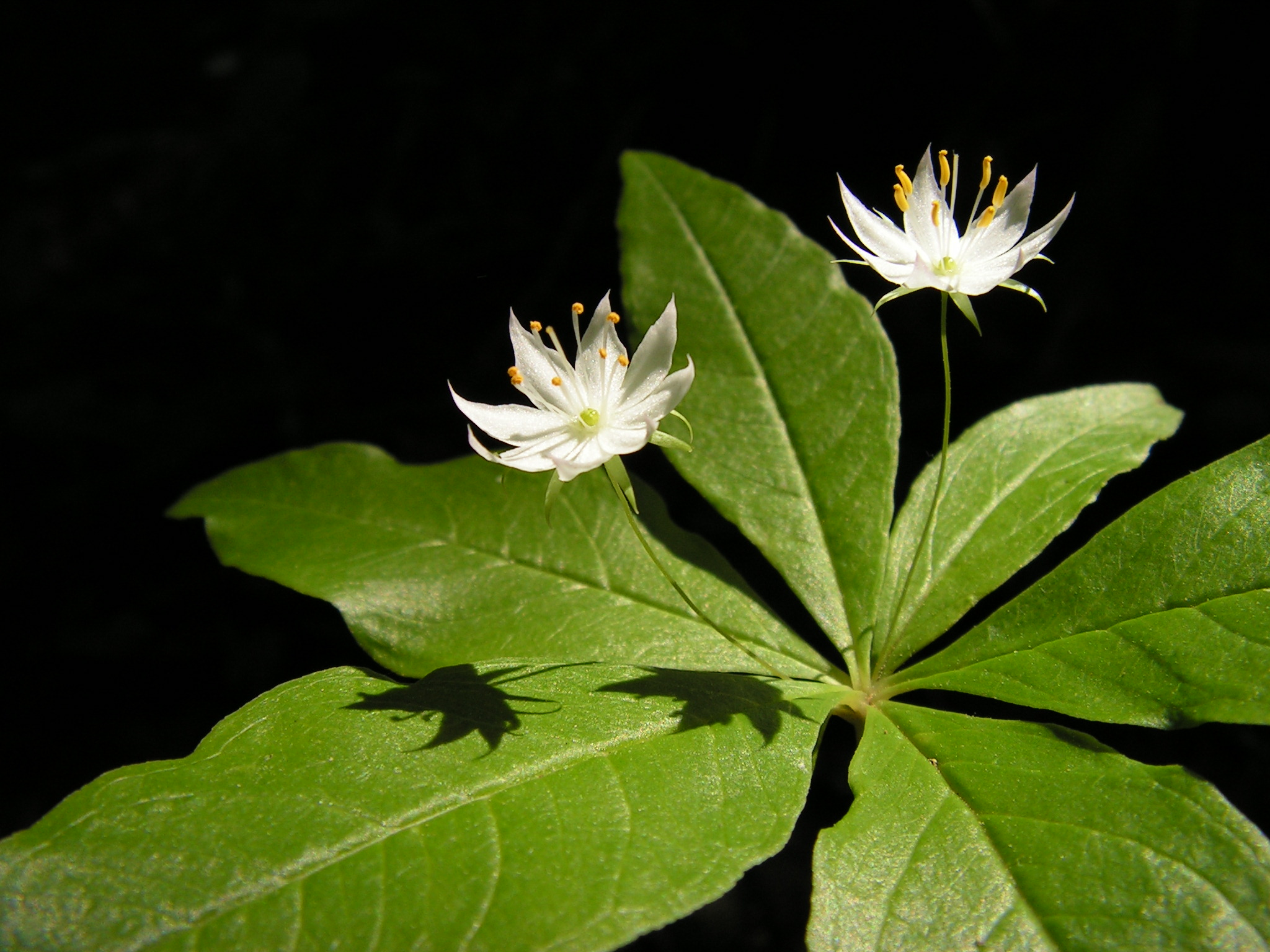

Conservation status
- Least Concern (IUCN 3.1)

- Secure (NatureServe)

Scientific classification
- Kingdom: Plantae
- Clade: Tracheophytes
- Clade: Angiosperms
- Clade: Eudicots
- Clade: Asterids
- Order: Ericales
- Family: Primulaceae
- Genus: Lysimachia
- Species: L. borealis

Binomial name
- Lysimachia borealis (Raf.) U.Manns & Anderb.

Synonyms
- Trientalis americana Pursh; Trientalis borealis Raf.

= Lysimachia borealis =

Species of flowering plant

Lysimachia borealis (synonym Trientalis borealis), the starflower, is a North American woodland perennial that blooms between May and June.

== Description ==
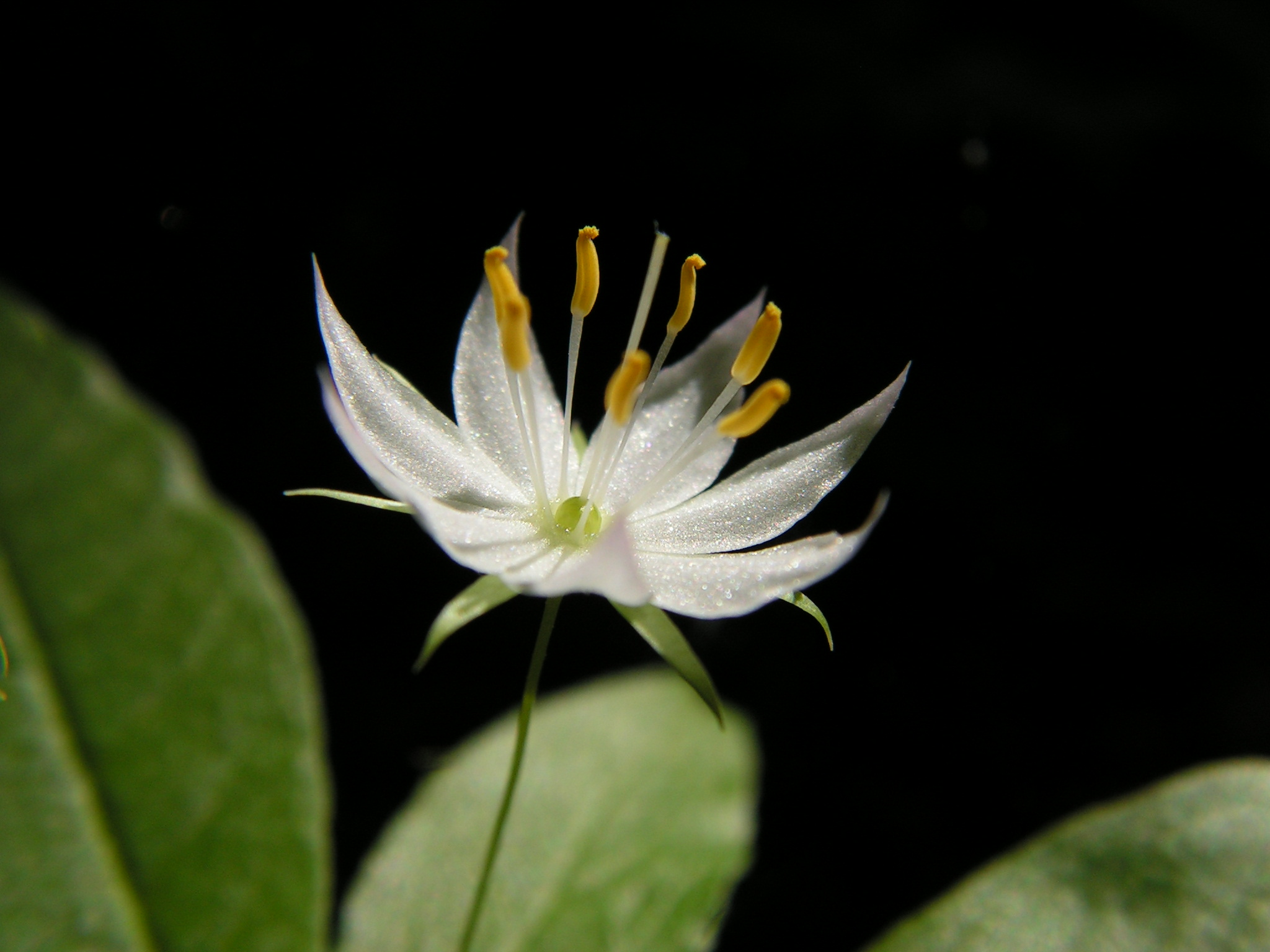
Flower

Starflowers have creeping rhizomes with 5–20 cm (2.0–7.9 in) vertical stalks. Each stalk has a whorl of 5–10 lanceolate leaves (up to 8 centimetres or 3.1 inches long) at its tip, with one to four (most often one or two) white flowers on smaller stalks extending from the center of the whorl. The flowers are about 15 mm (1/2 in) across and consist of five to nine petals that form a star-like shape. Its fruit is tiny, globe-shaped, pale blue, and matte.

== Biology ==
Lysimachia borealis has three, fairly discrete phases of the life cycle each year: shoot development, rhizome growth, and tuber formation. The species reproduces both sexually, by seed, and asexually, via tubers. Flowers are pollinated primarily by halictid and andrenid bees. In response to warming, L. borealis appears to shift reproductive effort away from sexual reproduction toward asexual vegetative spread.

The species may show evidence for local adaptation, as northern and southern populations display differences in the timing of initiation of shoot growth and in the response of seeds to cold stratification.

Starflower is a larval host for the weevil Pelenomus sulcicollis.

== Distribution and habitat ==
Lysimachia borealis is found from Canada to north-central and eastern United States, primarily in boreal forest in Canada and in northern conifer-hardwood forests in the United States. It is found in temperate climates. The species is one of the ten most common herbaceous-layer native plants in eastern deciduous U.S. National Park forests. Lysimachia latifolia (Pacific Starflower), which is a pinkish, purple variety, is native to the west coast of the United States and parts of western Canada.

== Taxonomy ==
Two subspecies are recognized by the U.S. Department of Agriculture:

- Trientalis borealis Raf. ssp. borealis
- Trientalis borealis Raf. ssp. latifolia (Hook.) Hultén – broadleaf starflower

== Conservation status ==
Lysimachia borealis is considered to be of "least concern" overall according to the International Union for Conservation of Nature. As of 2017, L. borealis is listed as endangered by Georgia and Kentucky and as threatened by Illinois and Tennessee.
