= Admaston/Bromley =

- Township (lower-tier)
- Township of Admaston/Bromley
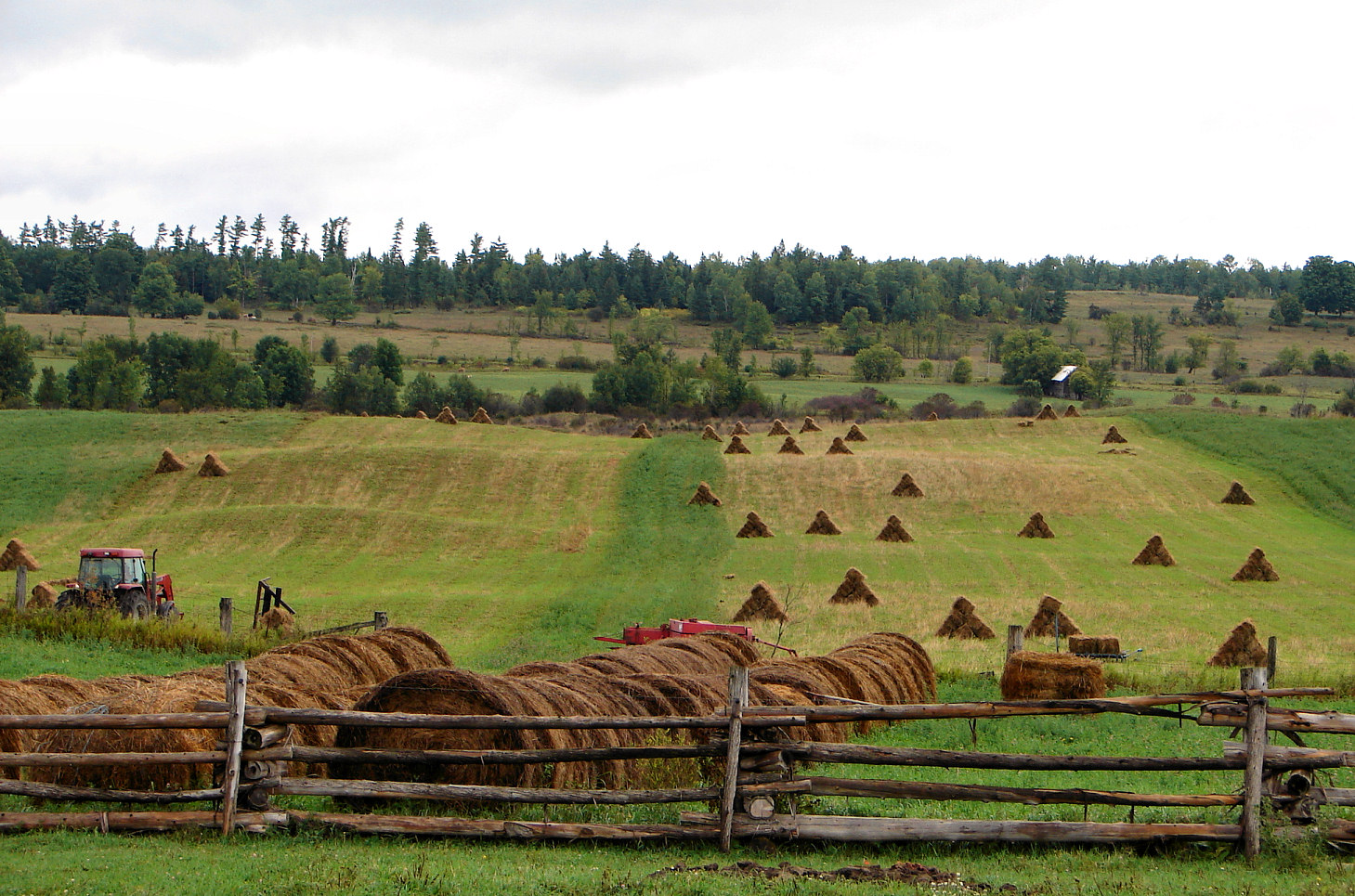
- Typical countryside near Douglas

- Location within Renfrew County Location within Southern Ontario
- Coordinates: 45°31′45″N 76°53′49″W
- Country: Canada
- Province: Ontario
- County: Renfrew
- Formed: January 1, 2000

Government
  - Type: Township
  - Mayor: Michael Donohue
  - MP: Cheryl Gallant (CPC)
  - MPP: Billy Denault (OPC)

Area
  - Land: 519.59 km^{2} (200.61 sq mi)

Population (2021)
  - Total: 2,995
  - Density: 5.8/km^{2} (15/sq mi)
- Time zone: UTC-5 (EST)
  - Summer (DST): UTC-4 (EDT)
- Postal code: K0J
- Area codes: 613,343
- Website: www.admastonbromley.com

Admaston/Bromley is an incorporated township in Renfrew County, Eastern Ontario, Canada. It was formed on January 1, 2000, when Admaston and Bromley Townships were amalgamated. It takes part of its name from Admaston, Staffordshire, a small English hamlet.

== Communities ==
The township comprises the communities of Admaston, Balsam Hill, Belangers Corners, Bromley, Bulgers Corners, Connaught, Douglas, Ferguslea, Fremo Corners, Kellys Corner, Martins Corner, McDougall, Moores Lake, Mount St. Patrick, Northcote, Oakgrove, Osceola, Payne, Pine Valley, Renfrew Junction, Rosebank, Shamrock, and Wolftown.

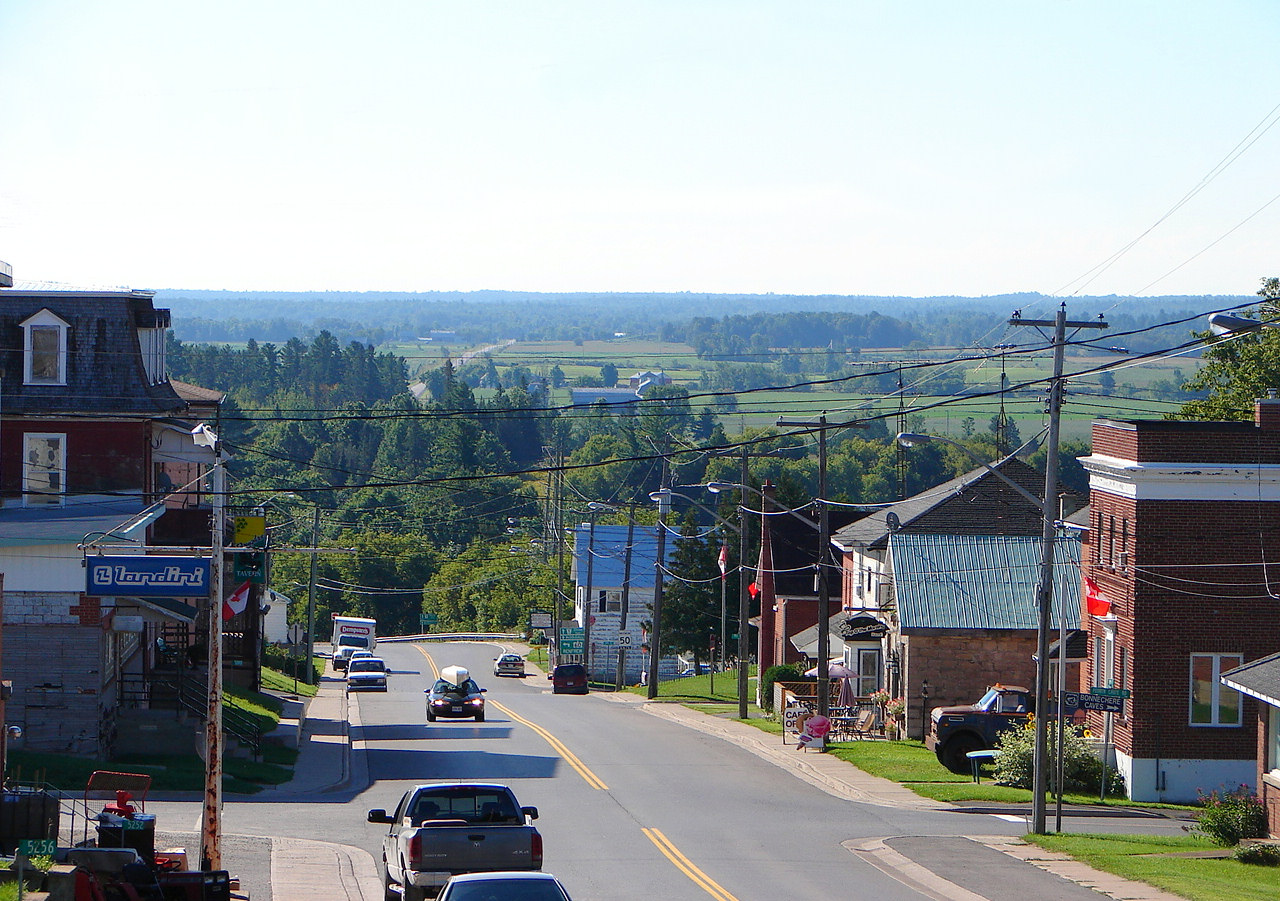
Douglas

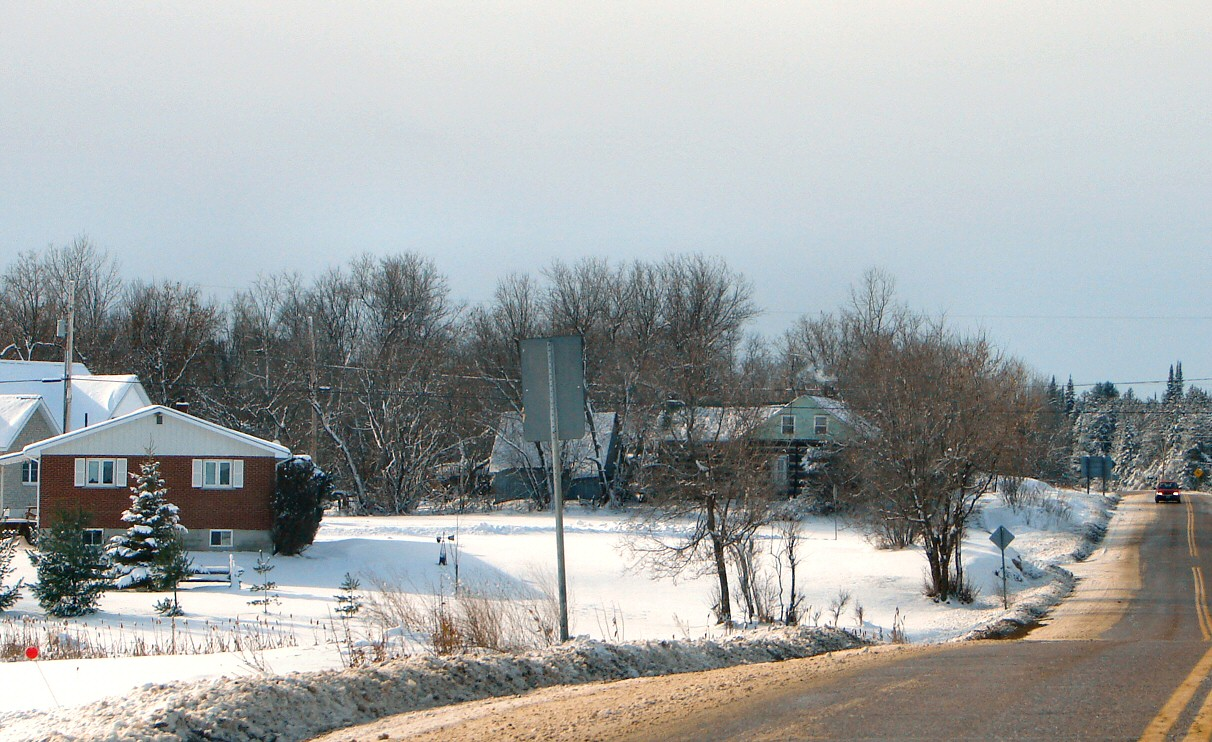
Shamrock

=== Admaston ===
The community, as well as the township, were named for the little village of Admaston, Staffordshire, the native home of Sir Charles Bagot, second Governor General of the Province of Canada .

=== Bromley ===
The community, as well as the township, took its name from Bagot's Bromley in Staffordshire, England, home of the Bagot family.

=== Douglas ===
When the post office was established in 1854, Scottish settlers chose the name Douglas after a town in Lanarkshire, Scotland. The town of Douglas is the third of five chutes along the Bonnechere River. The others being Castleford, Renfrew, Fourth Chute and Eganville. The chutes were used for moving timber past rapids and waterfalls; Douglas had a 21-foot (3.4 m) waterfall over which log drivers had to shepherd their timber.

=== Mount St. Patrick ===
The community was most likely first settled in the 1830s by squatters on the land, as there was no land registry until the 1850s. The settlers, almost solely Irish Catholics, named the village after Croagh Patrick, in County Mayo, Ireland.

== Demographics ==
In the 2021 Census of Population conducted by Statistics Canada, Admaston/Bromley had a population of 2,995 living in 1,136 of its 1,305 total private dwellings, a change of 2% from its 2016 population of 2,935. With a land area of 519.59 km^{2} (200.61 sq mi), it had a population density of 5.8/km^{2} (14.9/sq mi) in 2021.

Historical census populations – Admaston/Bromley
Year	Pop.	±%
2001	2,824	—
2006	2,716	−3.8%
2011	2,844	+4.7%
2016	2,935	+3.2%
2021	2,995	+2.0%
Source: Statistics Canada, 2016 2011, 2006, earlier

Historical census populations – Admaston Township

Year	Pop.	±%
1921	1,829	—
1931	1,650	−9.8%
1941	1,408	−14.7%
1951	1,277	−9.3%
1956	1,257	−1.6%
1961	1,325	+5.4%
1966	1,288	−2.8%

Year	Pop.	±%
1971	1,331	+3.3%
1976	1,440	+8.2%
1981	1,471	+2.2%
1986	1,515	+3.0%
1991	1,551	+2.4%
1996	1,648	+6.3%

Source: Statistics Canada

Historical census populations – Bromley Township

Year	Pop.	±%
1921	1,796	—
1931	1,586	−11.7%
1941	1,563	−1.5%
1951	1,628	+4.2%
1956	1,600	−1.7%
1961	1,447	−9.6%
1966	1,318	−8.9%

Year	Pop.	±%
1971	1,217	−7.7%
1976	1,208	−0.7%
1981	1,196	−1.0%
1986	1,142	−4.5%
1991	1,201	+5.2%
1996	1,189	−1.0%

Source: Statistics Canada

== Local government ==
List of former mayors:

- Raye-Anne Briscoe (2000–2014)
- Michael Donohue (2014–present)

== See also ==
- List of municipalities in Ontario
- List of townships in Ontario
