= Bonnechere River =

Bonnechere River Bonnechère River
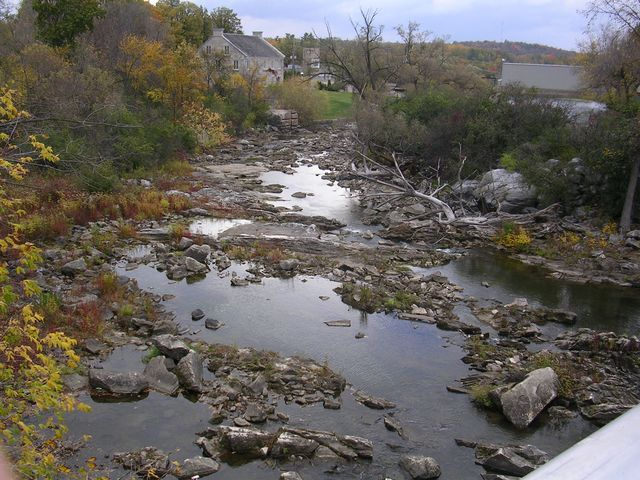
- Bonnechere River in Renfrew with low water level
- Etymology: from the French "bonne chère" meaning "plentiful good food"

Location
- Country: Canada
- Province: Ontario
- Regions: Eastern Ontario; Northeastern Ontario
- County/District: Renfrew County; Nipissing District

Physical characteristics
- Source: McKaskill Lake
  - location: Geographic Clancy Township, Unorganized South Part, Nipissing District, Northeastern Ontario
  - coordinates: 45°45′01″N 78°03′35″W
  - elevation: 371 m (1,217 ft)
- Mouth: Ottawa River
  - location: Horton, Renfrew County, Eastern Ontario
  - coordinates: 45°31′11″N 76°33′28″W
  - elevation: 72 m (236 ft)
- Length: 145 km (90 mi)
- Basin size: 2,400 km^{2} (930 sq mi)

Basin features
- Progression: Ottawa River→ St. Lawrence River→ Gulf of St. Lawrence
- River system: Ottawa River drainage basin

The Bonnechere River is a river in the Saint Lawrence River drainage basin in Nipissing District and Renfrew County in eastern and northeastern Ontario, Canada. The river flows from Algonquin Provincial Park to the Ottawa River east and north of the town of Renfrew. The river's name is thought to come from the French words bonne, meaning good, fair, pretty, or serving girl, and chère, meaning dear, fond, loving, or darling. Because of the variety of possible meanings these words hold, a direct translation of meaning is not very possible.

== Geography ==
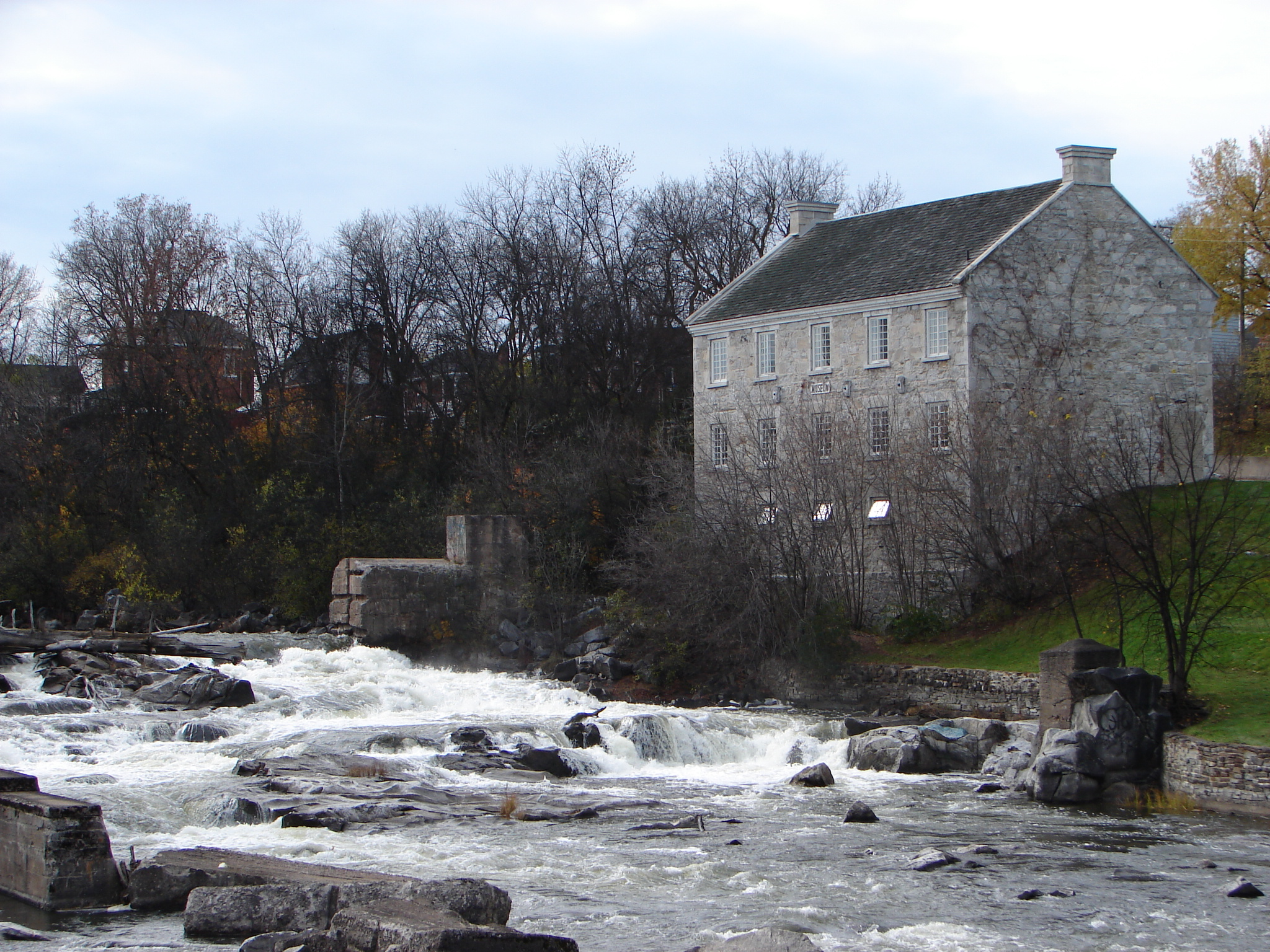
The Renfrew Museum along the Bonnechere River in Renfrew

The Bonnechere River begins in Algonquin Provincial Park at McKaskill Lake in geographic Clancy Township in the Unorganized South Part of Nipissing District. It heads north into geographic Niven Township, then loops back southeast into Clancy Township, under a Hydro One transmission corridor and into geographic Guthrie Township. It continues southeast through the Crooked Chute, over the High Falls, through the Stacks Rapids to the unincorporated place Basin Depot, located on a former logging road.

The river continues southeast out of the park at Boundary access point (Access point Q), enters geographic Burns Township in Madawaska Valley, Renfrew County, then heads into geographic Richards Township in Killaloe, Hagarty and Richards, Renfrew County, takes in the left tributary Pine River, passes through the Jack Chute Rapids, and reaches Round Lake, where it takes in the right tributary Sherwood River. The rivers leaves the lake at Grassy Bay controlled by the Round Lake Dam and reaches Golden Lake in North Algona Wilberforce, where it is crossed by Ontario Highway 60. The lake is home to Killaloe at the west and the Algonquins of Pikwàkanagàn First Nation at the southeast.

From Golden Lake until the river reaches Admaston/Bromley downstream, the river forms the boundary between North Algona Wilberforce (left bank, on the north) and Bonnechere Valley (right bank, on the south). The Bonnechere River leaves Golden Lake controlled by the Golden Lake Dam.

The river reaches its mouth at Lac des Chats on the Ottawa River near the settlement of Fergusons Beach.

The river is 145 kilometres (90 mi) long and drains an area of 2,400 square kilometres (927 sq mi).

=== The Chutes ===
There are five chutes along the Bonnechere River. The First Chute of the river is where the Bonnechere empties into the Ottawa River, at Castleford. The Second Chute is in Renfrew; this waterfall has a small hydroelectric dam. The Third Chute is in Douglas, which also has a small hydroelectric dam. The Fourth Chute is in the small village of Fourth Chute, and the Fifth Chute is in Eganville. The chutes used were for moving timber past rapids and waterfalls.

=== Tributaries ===
- Golden Lake
  - Scharfe Creek (left)
  - Eadys Creek (left)
  - Beaudrys Creek (left)
  - Browns Creek (left)
  - Sauers Creek (left)
  - Cochrane Creek (left)
  - Brennans Creek (right)
- Round Lake
  - Turners Creek (left)
  - Reserve Creek (left)
  - Jacks Creek (left)
  - Sherwood River (right)
  - Byers Creek (right)
- Pine River (left)
- Robitaille Creek (right)
- Dupuis Creek (left)
- Hogan Creek (right)
- Jenkins Creek (left)
- Batise Creek (left)
- Gross Creek (left)
- McGuire Creek (right)
- North Bonnechere River (left)
- Fairy Creek (left)

== Economy ==
During the 19th century, the river was used to transport white pine logs from the forested areas surrounding the river. Throughout the 20th century, the Bonnechere River became increasingly recognized for its hydroelectric potential. Currently, Renewable Power Generation (RPG) utilizes the river's water to turn turbines and produce electricity, which is then sold to the Province of Ontario under contract.

== Natural history ==
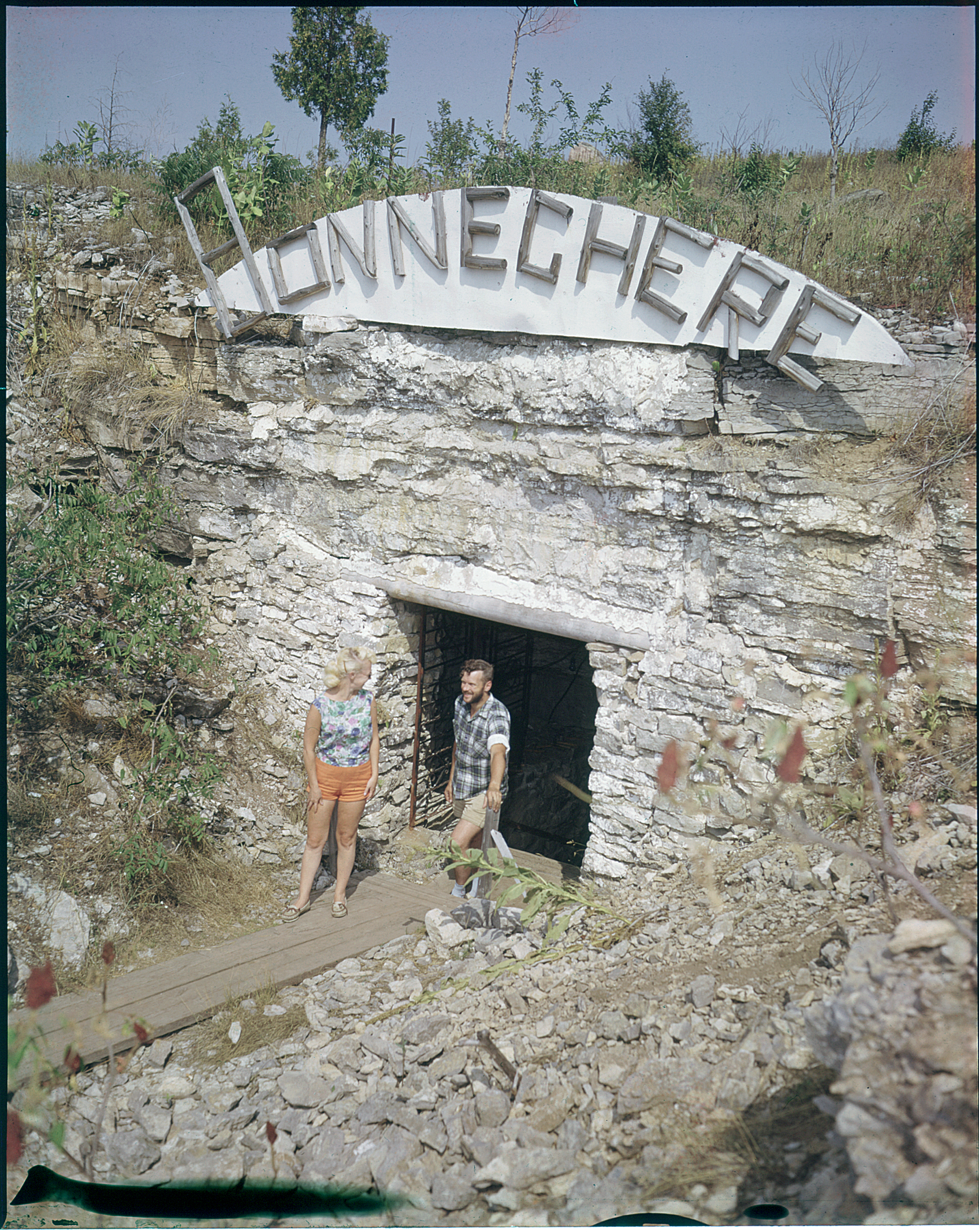
Bonnechere Caves, Eganville, 1959

The Bonnechère Caves, formed from ancient limestone, are located by the river near the village of Eganville, Ontario, in the hamlet of Fourth Chute, Ontario.

There are two provincial parks along its length: the Bonnechere River Provincial Park (a 23 km long section bordering Algonquin Park) and the Bonnechere Provincial Park (located on Round Lake).

The Bonnechere River lies mostly in a 175 million-year-old rift valley called the Ottawa-Bonnechere Graben.

Over the years, songs have been written about the Bonnechere River including the recent "In The Arms Of The Bonnechere River" by Ottawa Valley singer/songwriter, Terry McLeish.

== River run & recreational opportunities ==
Each year the river is host to a raft run between the third and fourth chute. Originally arranged by local Shriners, the run has taken on a less official status, occurring with little to no organization apart from its pre-determined date during Victoria Day weekend. Participants design and build a raft or anything else they hope will take them down the river. The river presents natural obstacles in the form of light rapids. There is no competitive angle to the run with no prize at the end other than warmth and a good time. Most participants are young adults from the area returning to visit friends and family. Having recently surpassed its twenty-fourth year, the river run is a local tradition.

The upper Bonnechere River drains from Basin Lake in eastern Algonquin Park and is joined by the lower Pine River at Supply Lake before continuing on to Round Lake at Bonnechere Provincial Park. A popular public launching area for kayaking and canoeing is located at the intersection of Paugh Lake and Basin Depot Roads. The river's inadequate park boundaries ( buffer) along its south shore have failed to protect the river from the sight of commercial logging which commenced in 2023 along White Mountain Chute Road. The annual work schedule (AWS) for this period extracted thousands of old growth white pine trees which are no longer visible along the upper Bonnechere River. The Pine River watershed, a unique contribution to the Bonnechere River, remains essentially undeveloped with cottages. However, it has no legal protection from industrial use. It was withdrawn from protection during the 1990s conservative Ontario government Premier Mike Harris's "Lands for Life" process. Illegal squatting has transpired in recent years with the establishment of a dilapidated house trailer on lower Pine Lake. Non-resident deer hunters have complained that their hunting privileges have been curtailed by local hunters which refuse to dismantle their hunting platforms at the end of each fall season. This illegal practice permits locals to claim prime hunting grounds in advance of the season.

A privately owned hundred acre parcel northwest of Lower Pine lake was purchased around 2022 by a Toronto-based electronic music festival called Summerdaze. This has rattled some traditional canoe trippers who argue it is an inappropriate use of the significant natural area. The remote location is inundated by thousands of festival participants from Toronto during the last long weekend in August each year.

Both the upper Bonnechere River and Pine River have been allocated for logging during the last Ottawa Valley Forest Management Plan.

== See also ==
- Madawaska River (Ontario) - nearby river with similar characteristics

== Sources ==
- McMurtrie, Jeffrey (2008). "Algonquin Provincial Park and the Haliburton Highlands". Wikimedia Commons. Archived from the original on 2011-06-29.
- Map 10 (PDF) (Map). 1 : 700,000. Official road map of Ontario. Ministry of Transportation of Ontario. 2010-01-01.
- Restructured municipalities - Ontario map #5 (Map). Restructuring Maps of Ontario. Ontario Ministry of Municipal Affairs and Housing. 2006. Archived from the original on 2020-05-11.
