= Golden Lake =

Lake in Renfrew County, Ontario, Canada

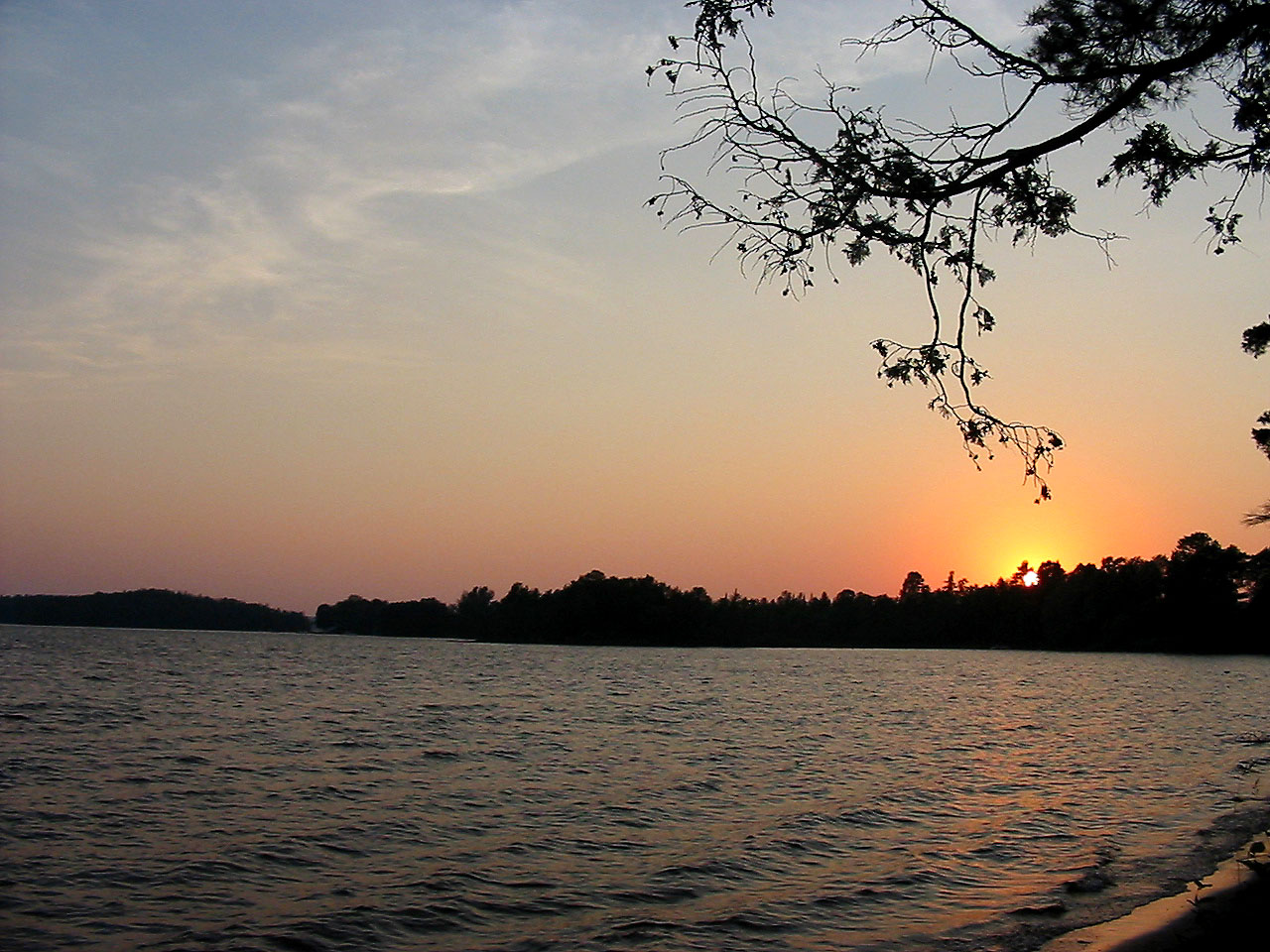
- at sunset

- Location within Ontario
- Location: Renfrew County, Ontario
- Coordinates: 45.57°N 77.35°W
- Primary inflows: Bonnechere River
- Primary outflows: Bonnechere River
- Basin countries: Canada
- Surface area: 13.5 sq mi (35 km^{2})
- Average depth: 35 ft (11 m)
- Max. depth: 81 ft (25 m)
- Settlements: Killaloe, Golden Lake

Golden Lake is a body of water located in Renfrew County Ontario, located on the Bonnechere River approximately 25 km (15 miles) southwest of Pembroke, Ontario. It is bounded by the Township of North Algona-Wilberforce, the Township of Bonnechere Valley and Algonquins of Pikwàkanagàn First Nation.

Omàmiwininì Pimàdjwowin, the Algonquin Way Cultural Centre is located at 1674 Mishomis Inamo, Pikwakanagan First Nation.

The lake is made up of three sections, with the largest section at the western end of the lake, followed by a slightly smaller section to the east, and finally a much smaller section at the eastern end of the lake, where it flows into the Bonnechere River.

Golden Lake is known for its smallmouth bass and Northern pike fishing, and has a smooth, sandy bottom in most places. The lake reportedly got its name from the flecks of pyrite or "fool's gold" that can be seen glinting on the bottom of the lake near the shore. Not far from Golden Lake is another lake called Lake Doré, which is French for "Golden lake."
