= North Algona Wilberforce =

- Township municipality (lower-tier)
- Township of North Algona Wilberforce
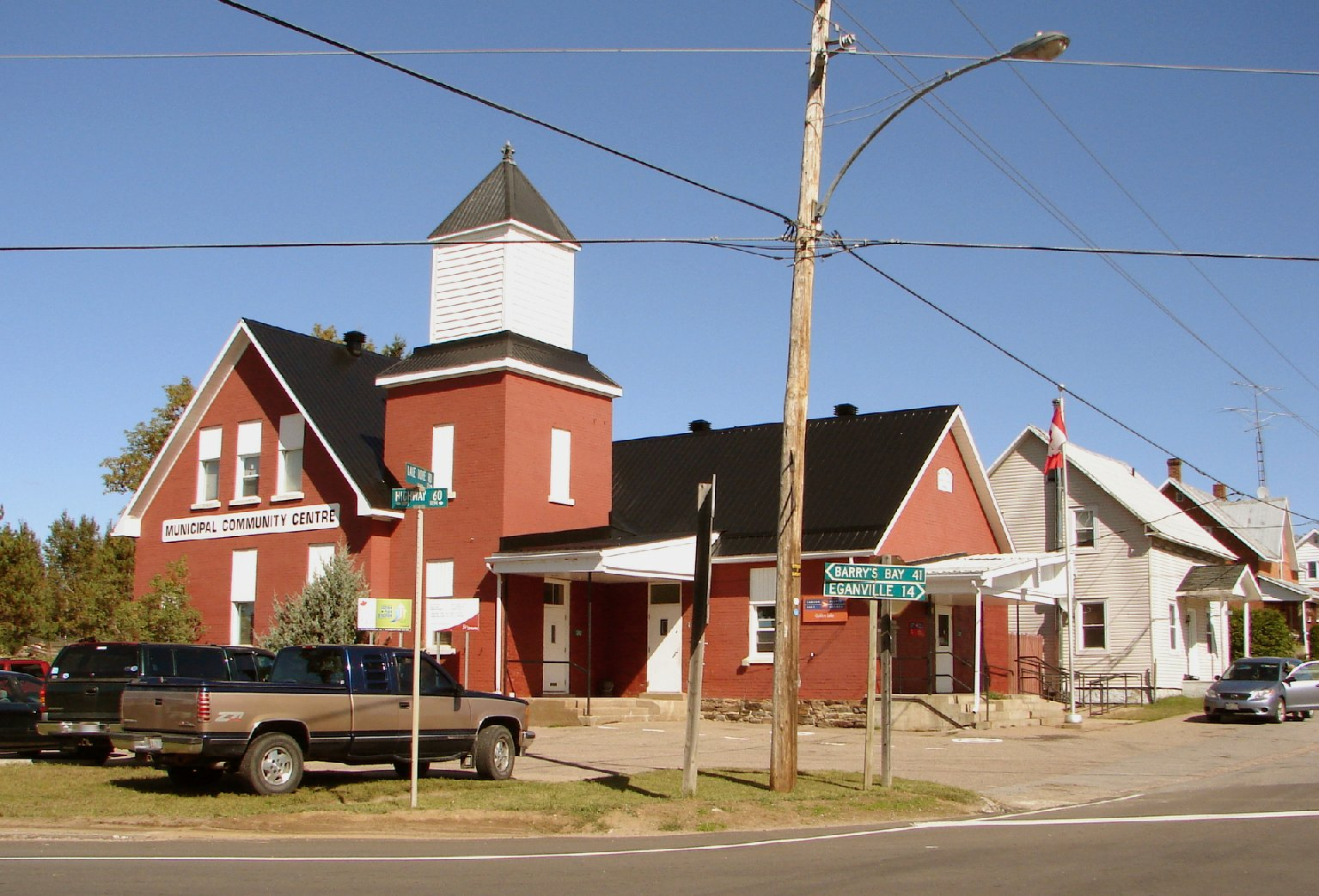
- Golden Lake community centre and Post Office (K0J 1X0)

- Location within Renfrew County Location within Southern Ontario
- Coordinates: 45°37′06″N 77°13′13″W
- Country: Canada
- Province: Ontario
- County: Renfrew
- Formed: January 1, 1999

Government
  - Mayor: James Brose
  - Federal riding: Algonquin—Renfrew—Pembroke
  - Prov. riding: Renfrew—Nipissing—Pembroke

Area
  - Land: 369.23 km^{2} (142.56 sq mi)

Population (2021)
  - Total: 3,111
  - Density: 8.4/km^{2} (22/sq mi)
- Time zone: UTC-5 (EST)
  - Summer (DST): UTC-4 (EDT)
- Postal Code: K0J 1T0
- Area codes: 613, 343
- Website: www.nalgonawil.com

North Algona Wilberforce is a township municipality in Renfrew County, Ontario, Canada. It has a population of 3,111. The township was formed in 1999 when the North Algona and Wilberforce townships were amalgamated.

Wilberforce Township was named in 1851, to honour William Wilberforce.

== Communities ==
The township contains the communities of Allans Corners, Beef Town, Budd Mills, Crooked Rapids, Deacon, Dore Bay, Duquette's Farm, Fourth Chute, Germanicus, Golden Lake, Green Lake, Higginson's Hill, Lake Dore, Lett's Corners, Mink Lake, Mud Lake, Rankin, Slabtown, Trevor Ouellette Lake and Woito.

=== Fourth Chute ===
The town of Fourth Chute is the fourth of five chutes along the Bonnechere River. The others being Castleford, Renfrew, Douglas and Eganville. The chutes used were for moving timber past rapids and waterfalls.

== Demographics ==
In the 2021 Census of Population conducted by Statistics Canada, North Algona Wilberforce had a population of 3,111 living in 1,297 of its 1,757 total private dwellings, a change of 6.7% from its 2016 population of 2,915. With a land area of 369.23 km^{2} (142.56 sq mi), it had a population density of 8.4/km^{2} (21.8/sq mi) in 2021.

Canada census – North Algona Wilberforce community profile

	2021	2016	2011
Population	3,111 (+6.7% from 2016)	2915 (1.5% from 2011)	2873 (1.2% from 2006)
Land area	369.23 km^{2} (142.56 sq mi)	378.98 km^{2} (146.32 sq mi)	378.53 km^{2} (146.15 sq mi)
Population density	8.4/km^{2} (22/sq mi)	7.7/km^{2} (20/sq mi)	7.6/km^{2} (20/sq mi)
Median age	52.0 (M: 51.2, F: 52.8)	51.5 (M: 50.4, F: 52.5)
Private dwellings	1,757 (total) 1,297 (occupied)	1,752 (total) 1,243 (occupied)	1668 (total)
Median household income	$82,000	$68,139

References: 2021 2016 2011

Historical census populations – North Algona Wilberforce
Year	Pop.	±%
1996	2,595	—
2001	2,729	+5.2%
2006	2,840	+4.1%
2011	2,873	+1.2%
2016	2,915	+1.5%
2021	3,111	+6.7%
Source: Statistics Canada

Mother tongue (2021):

- English as first language: 93.7%
- French as first language: 2.4%
- English and French as first language: 0.8%
- Other as first language: 2.9%

== Transportation ==
The township is served by Ontario Highway 41 and Ontario Highway 60.

Canadian National Railway served Golden Lake on the Algonquin and Locksley subdivisions. Rail service was discontinued in 1961 on the Locksley Subdivision. The Algonquin Subdivision was broken in 1933 due to an unsafe trestle in the Algonquin Park at Cache Lake. The section east of the break became the Renfrew Subdivision, which maintained service until 1984. The grades of both lines now serve at trails for snow machines, ATVs and bicycles.

== See also ==
- List of townships in Ontario
