= Eganville, Ontario =

Eganville
- Unincorporated community
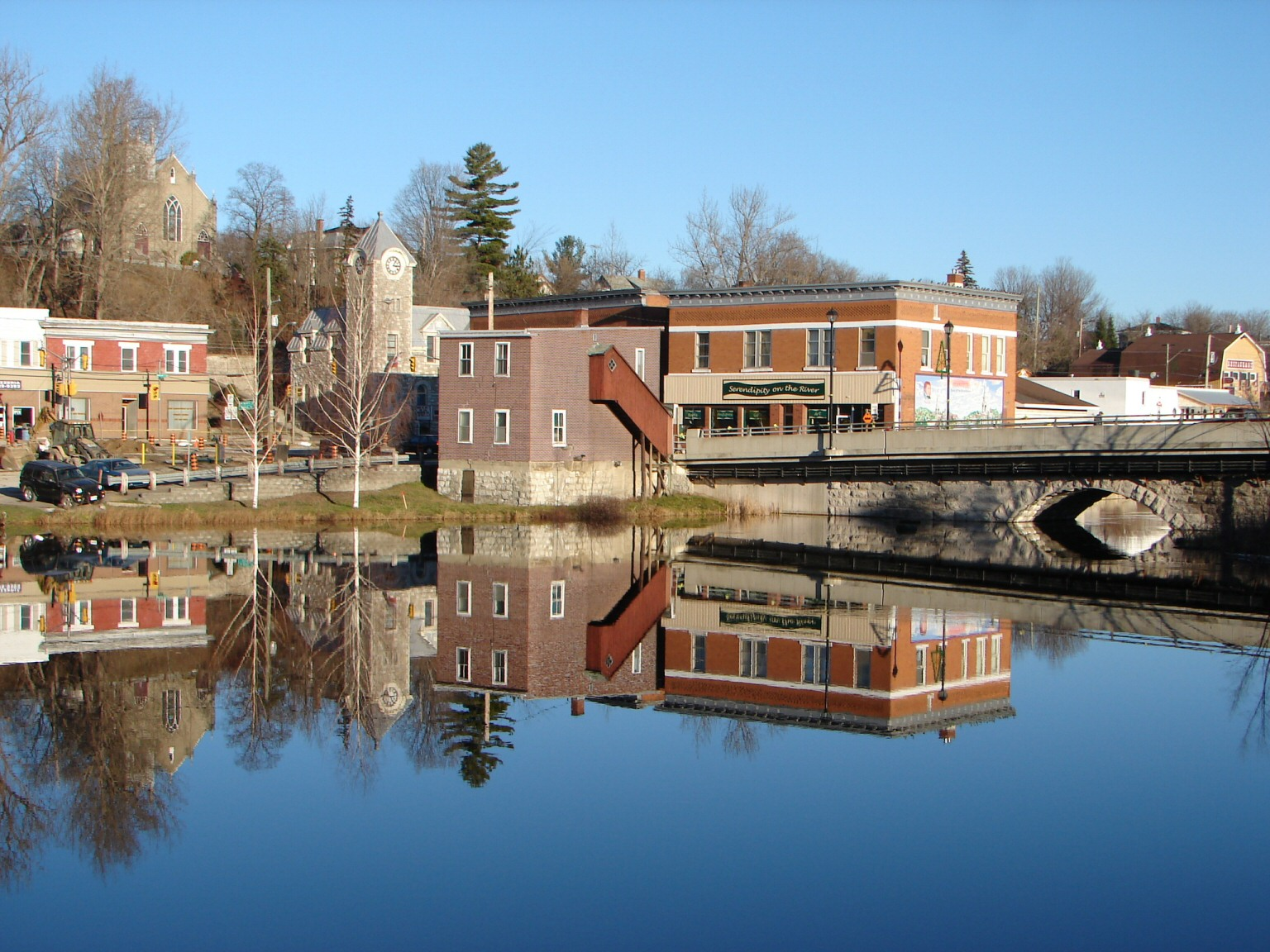

- Location within Renfrew County Location within Southern Ontario
- Coordinates: 45°32′N 77°06′W
- Country: Canada
- Province: Ontario
- County: Renfrew County
- Township: Bonnechere Valley

Government
  - MPs: Cheryl Gallant (Algonquin—Renfrew—Pembroke)
  - MPPs: Billy Denault (Renfrew—Nipissing—Pembroke)

Area
  - Land: 2.26 km^{2} (0.87 sq mi)

Population (2021)
  - Total: 1,149
  - Density: 508.2/km^{2} (1,316/sq mi)
- Time zone: UTC-5 (Eastern (EST))
  - Summer (DST): UTC-4 (Eastern (EDT))
- Postal code: K0J 1T0
- Area codes: 613 and 343

Eganville is an unincorporated community within a deep limestone valley carved at the Fifth Chute of the Bonnechere River in Renfrew County, Ontario, Canada. Eganville lies within the Township of Bonnechere Valley.

Eganville is known as the Ordovician Fossil Capital of Canada. There are many fossils to be found in this area from approximately 500 million years ago (in a time before dinosaurs) including coral, crinoids, trilobites, cephalopods, gastropods, pelecypods, stromatolites, and brachiopods. The Bonnechere Valley is also a gateway to some of north-eastern Ontario's best-known tourist destinations, including the nearby Bonnechere Caves. The caves are located under a hill of limestone, said by geologists to have been the bottom of a tropical sea 500 million years ago. The Bonnechere Museum, through a partnership with the Bonnechere Caves, offers fossil hunts four times in a summer season where people can practice finding fossils and even take one home if they find a good one. Eganville is also home to a Geo-Heritage Walking Trail located along the Bonnechere River which features a fossil pit, a visit to an old quarry, a trench, wild plants, and scenic lookouts.

Eganville is a stop to destinations into central Ontario. Ontario Highway 41, which runs north–south from Pembroke to Napanee, intersects with Ontario Highway 60 in Eganville.

The town of Eganville is the fifth of five chutes along the Bonnechere River, the others being Castleford, Renfrew, Douglas and Fourth Chute. The chutes were used for moving timber past rapids and waterfalls.

== History ==
The first settler in Eganville was Gregoire Belanger in 1825. He built the first lumber shanty on the Bonnechere River. He then sold the area to James Wadsworth in 1826 who called it "New Fairfield Farm". Wadsworth then sold the area to Eganville's name-sake John Egan who was both a lumberman and a politician. The power of the river has been harnessed since 1848 but it was John Egan's grist mill that is credited with stimulating the town's growth. After his death in 1857 (at the age of 46) his family ran the business for ten years before selling to James Bonfield and Robert Turner.

Eganville's post office dates from 1852.

In 1911, a major fire destroyed many of the buildings in Eganville. Some 75 homes were lost along with schools, churches and industries along both sides on the Bonnechere River. A year later, the village post office was erected and used for almost a century. It was then used as the Municipal building. This building has since become the home of the Bonnechere Museum and is one of the best-known symbols of Eganville.

Eganville was incorporated as a Village in the 1890s and remained an independent municipality until it was amalgamated with the Townships of Grattan, Sebastopol, and South Algona to form the Township of Bonnechere Valley in 2001.

== Demographics ==
Historical census populations – Eganville, Ontario

Year	Pop.	±%
1921	1,015	—
1931	1,020	+0.5%
1941	1,088	+6.7%
1951	1,326	+21.9%
1956	1,598	+20.5%
1961	1,549	−3.1%

Year	Pop.	±%
1966	1,478	−4.6%
1971	1,395	−5.6%
1976	1,328	−4.8%
1981	1,245	−6.2%
1986	1,316	+5.7%
1991	1,292	−1.8%

Year	Pop.	±%
1996	1,319	+2.1%
2001	1,230	−6.7%
2006	1,240	+0.8%
2011	1,226	−1.1%
2016	1,085	−11.5%
2021	1,149	+5.9%

2016 Population figure based on revised count. Population counts are not adjusted for boundary changes.
Source: Statistics Canada

== Media ==
=== Print ===
The Eganville Leader is an independently owned weekly newspaper serving west and central Renfrew County.

Founded by Patrick McHugh in 1902, the Leader is one of the region’s oldest and most enduring weekly newspapers. Originally, it coexisted with a rival, the Star Enterprise, at the time of Eganville’s devastating 1911 fire. That blaze destroyed most of the north side of town and several buildings on the south side. Both newspapers lost their offices in the blaze—but while the Star Enterprise ceased operations, the Leader “rose from the ashes,” continuing publication and solidifying its place in the community.

After serving under McHugh for decades, the Leader was purchased by the Tracey family in 1944. Ambrose and Sylvester Tracey took over, with Ambrose becoming sole owner in 1962. Upon Ambrose’s passing in 1968, his eldest son Ron became publisher—later joined by his brother Gerald in 1972. Ron retired in September, 2007 after 51 years in the business. Gerald would lead the paper through 52 years in the business and announce in early 2025 that operations will cease in February 2026, citing his health and age.

== Notable people ==
Ice hockey players Dale McTavish and Shawn Heins and Olympian Melissa Bishop were born in Eganville.
