= Bonnechere Provincial Park =

Provincial park in Ontario, Canada

- IUCN category II (national park)
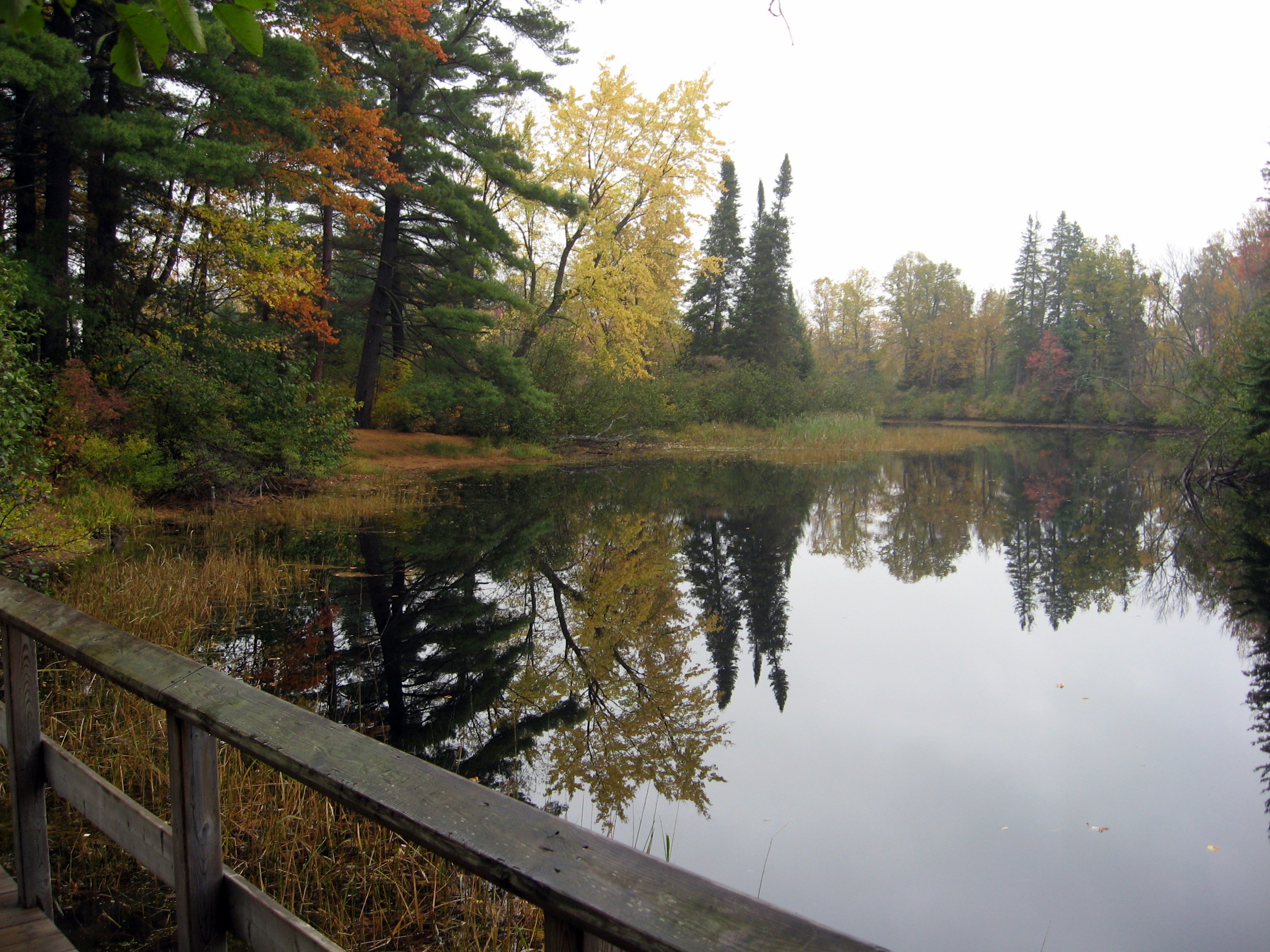
- The Bonnechere River in autumn as it snakes through the park campground.

- Location within Southern Ontario
- Interactive map of Bonnechere Provincial Park
- Location: Round Lake, Renfrew County, Ontario, Canada
- Nearest city: Pembroke, Ontario
- Coordinates: 45.659°N 77.573°W
- Area: 162 hectares (400 acres)
- Established: 1967
- Visitors: 53,878 (in 2022)
- Governing body: Ontario Parks
- Website: https://www.ontarioparks.ca/park/bonnechere

Bonnechere Provincial Park is an Ontario provincial park located on Round Lake in Renfrew County, Ontario, Canada.

Designated as recreational-class by Ontario Parks, it has 128 campsites, 4 rustic cabins and a day use area, which includes a shower station, playground and a beach.

== Gallery ==
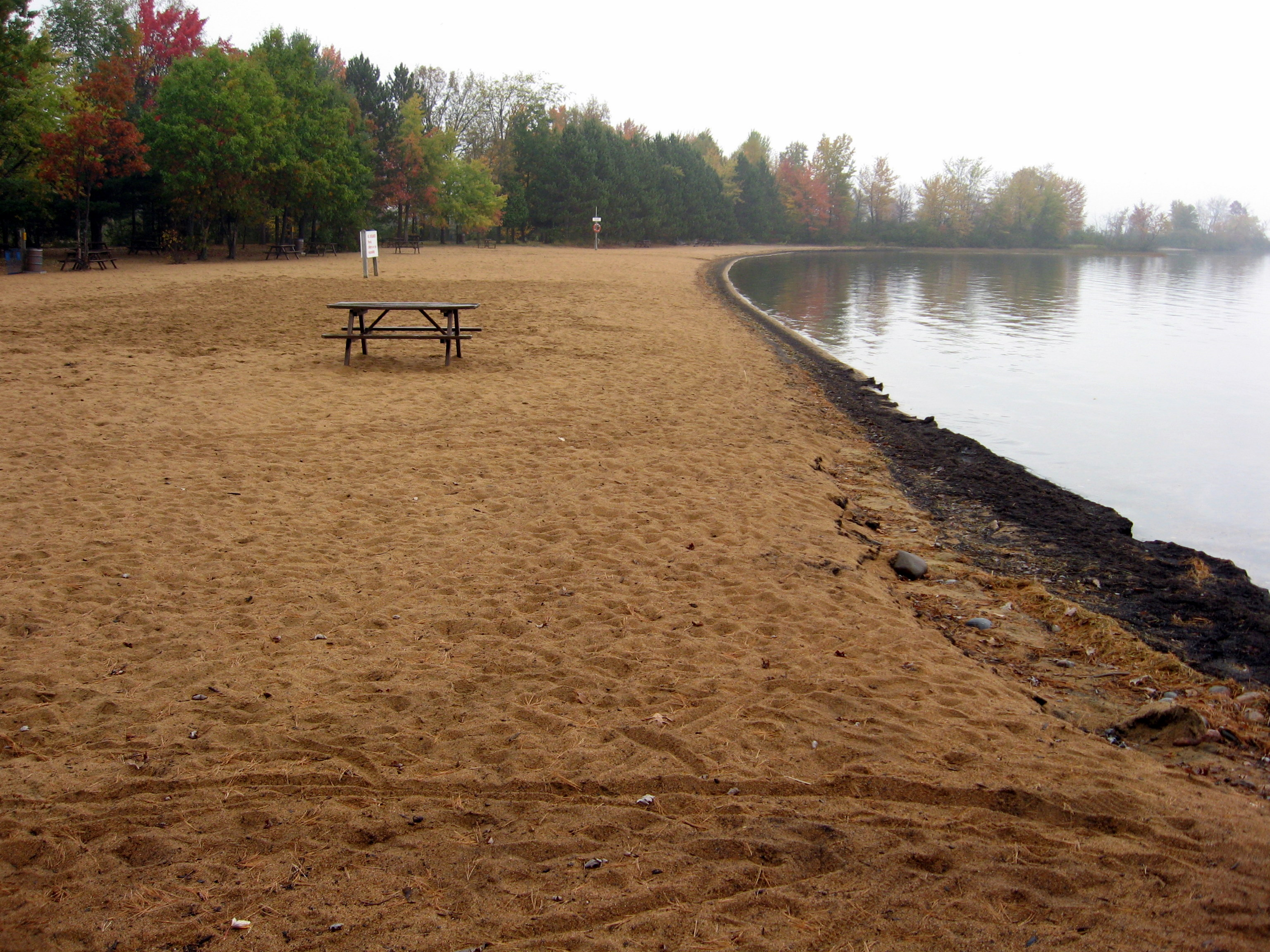
The park beach on Round Lake.

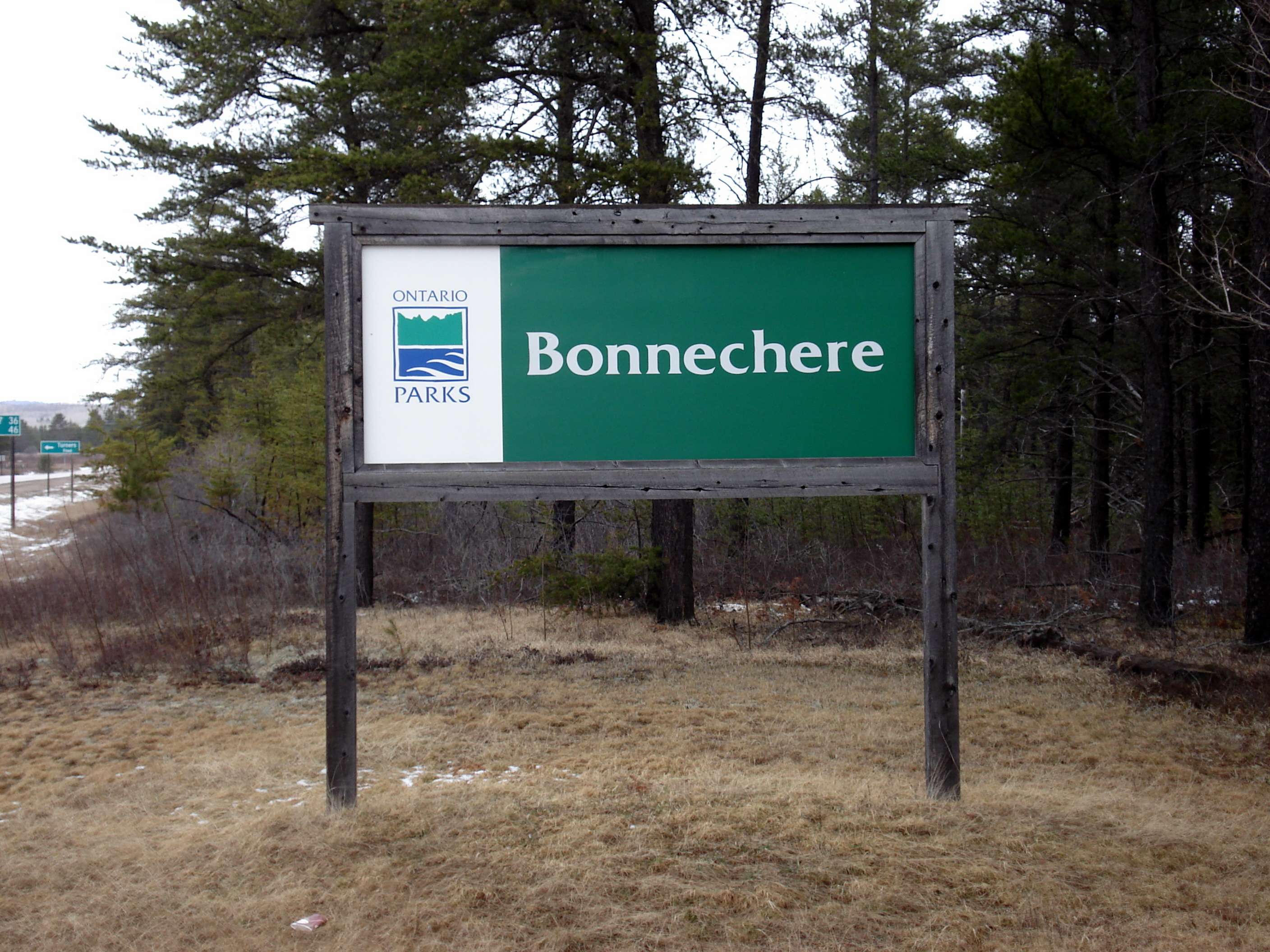
The main gate.

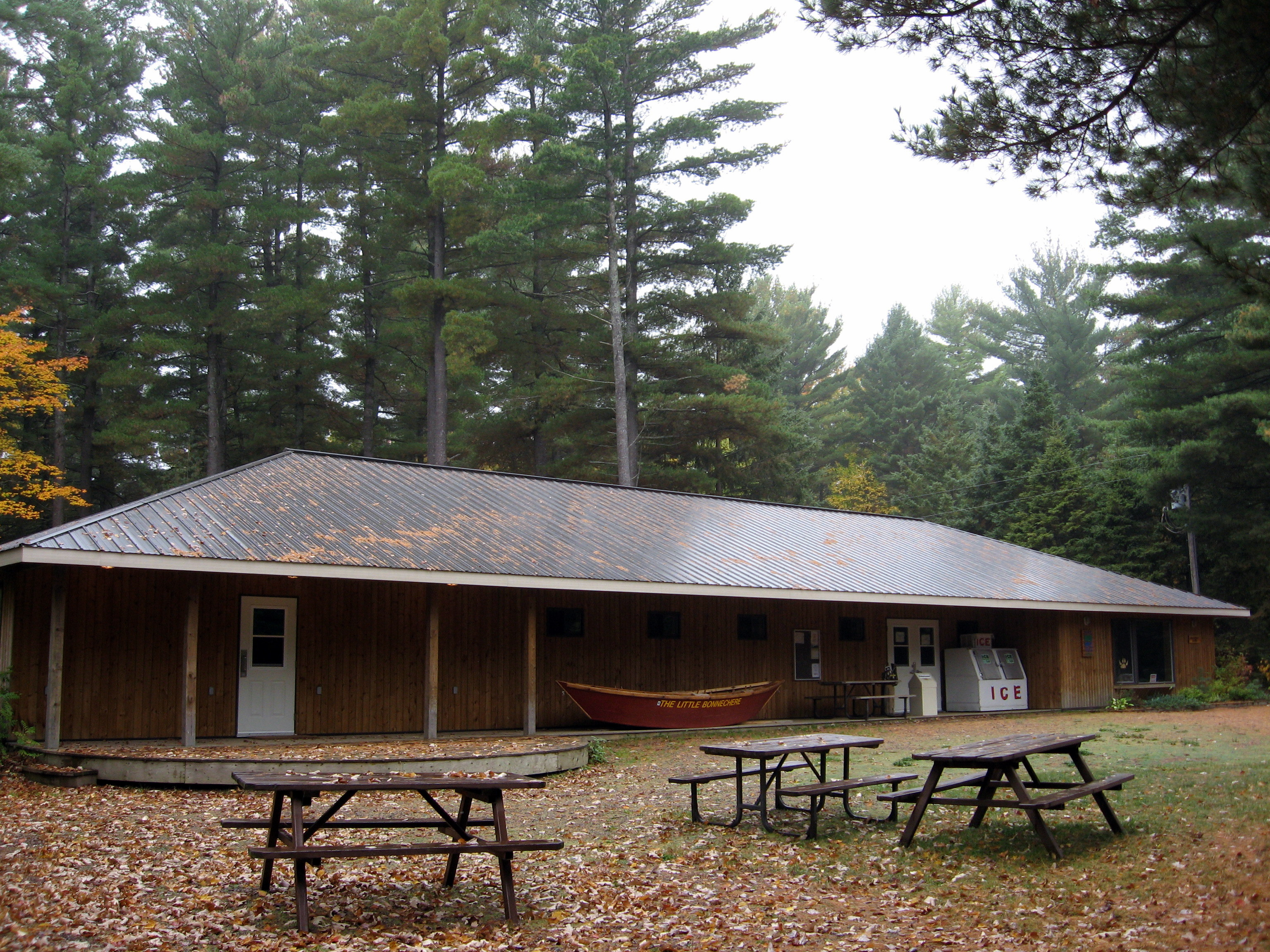
The Davenport Center, which houses the park's store and educational programming.

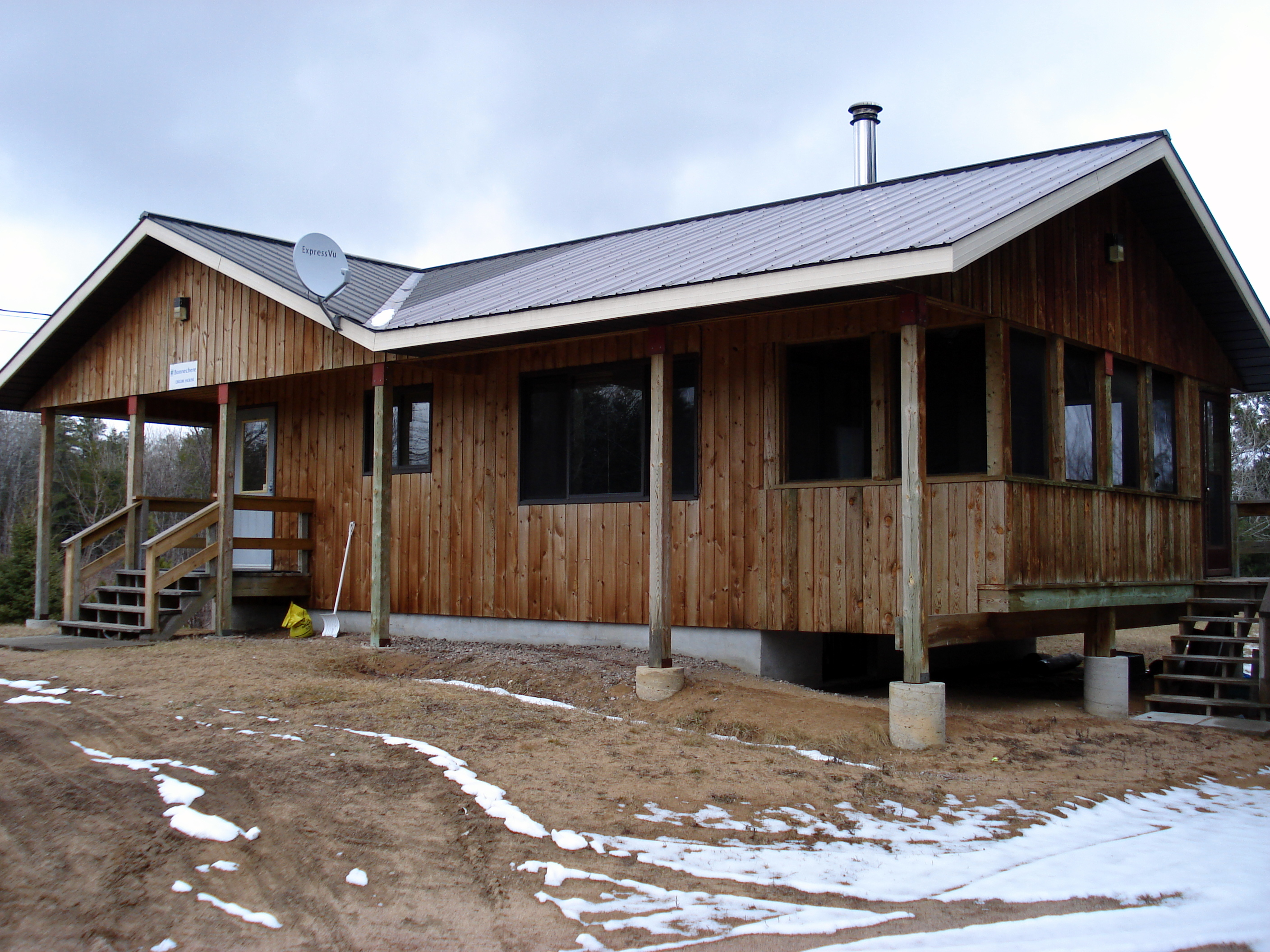
Okum House, used for staff housing.

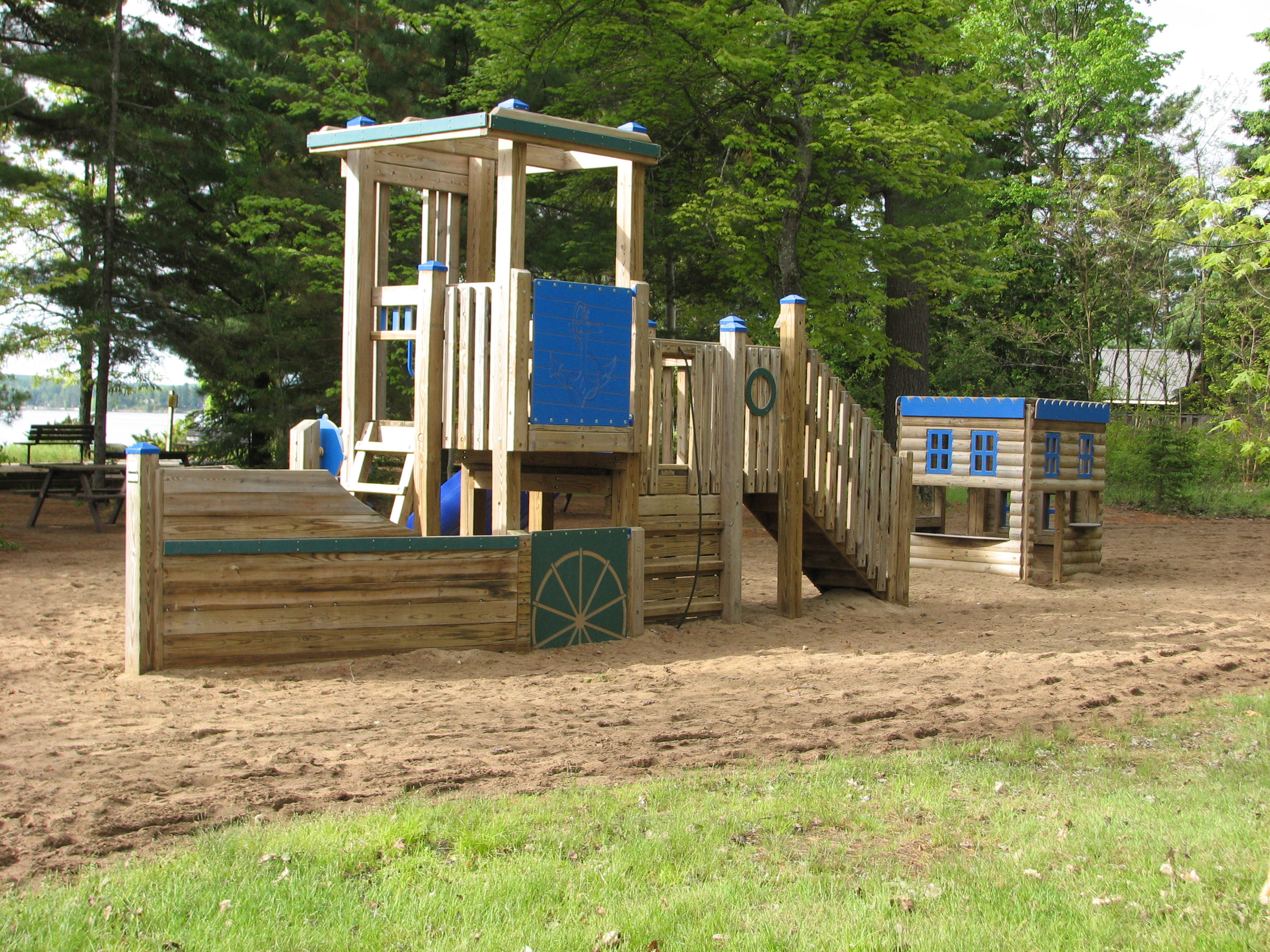
Playground near beach on Round Lake

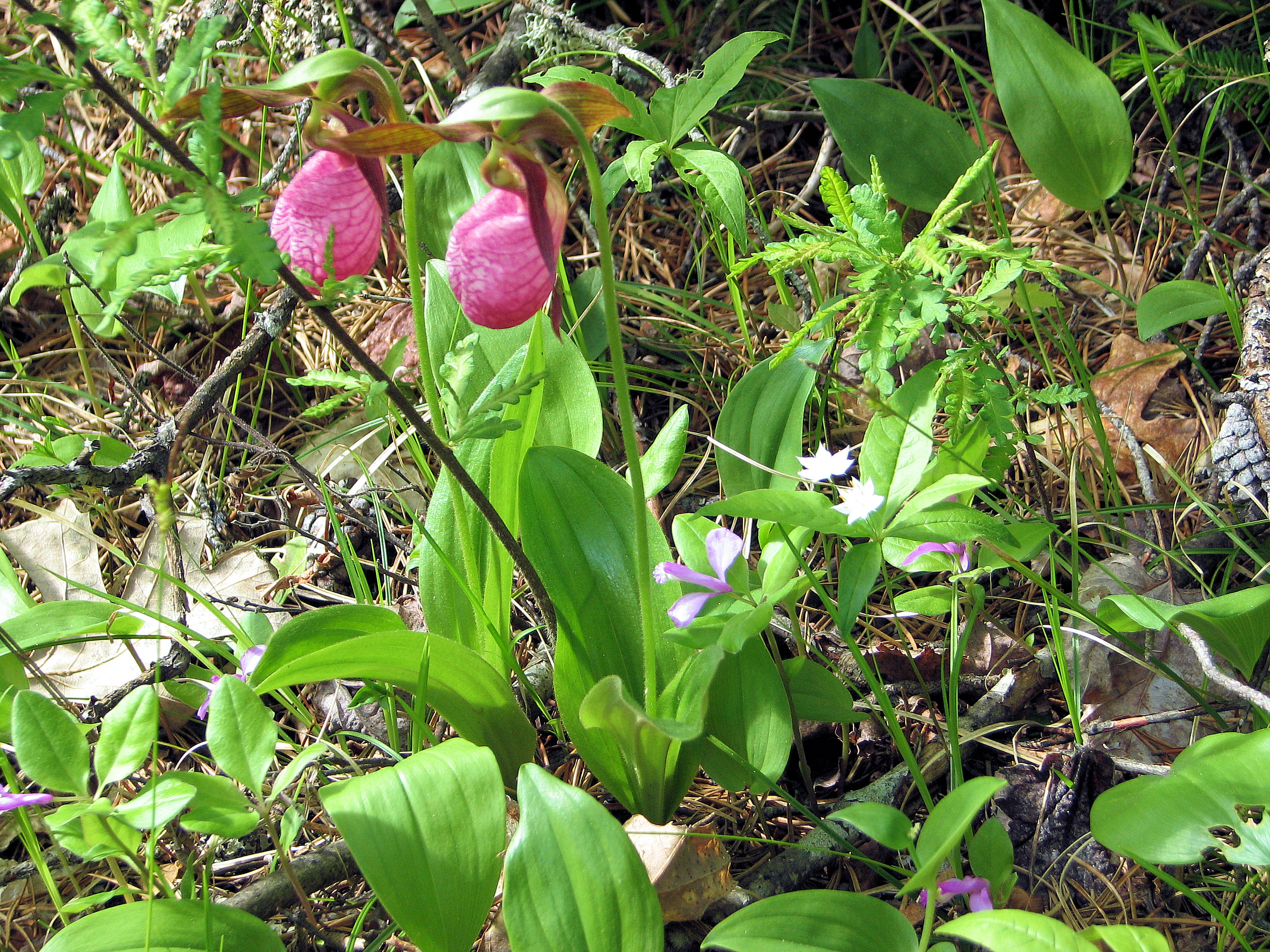
Two Pink Lady Slippers (Cypripedium acaule) and two Northern Starflowers (Trientalis borealis).

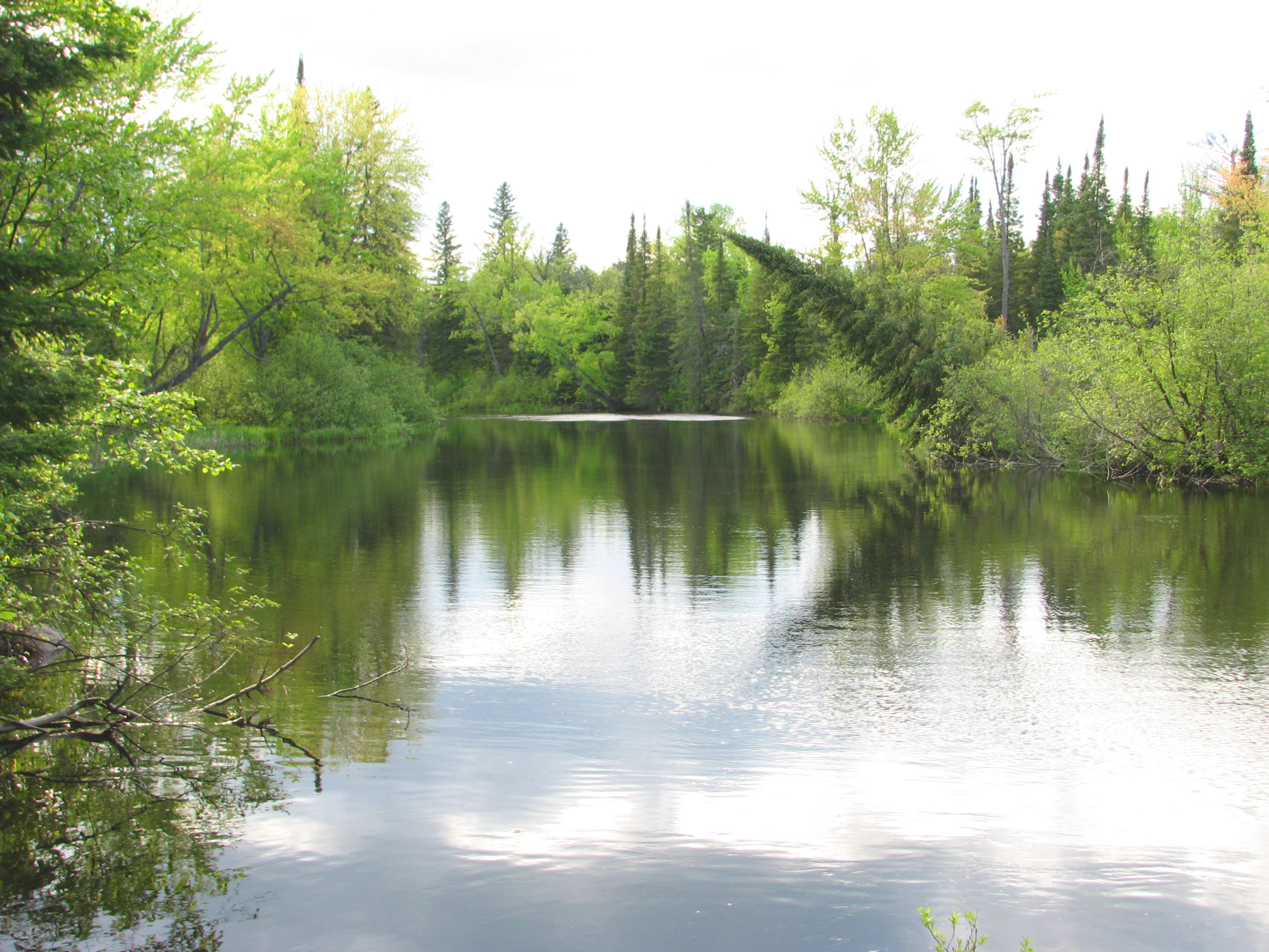
Bonnechere River runs through it.

== See also ==
- List of Ontario parks
