= Red Cross Hospital =

Red Cross Hospital may refer to:

- Red Cross Hospital, Bancroft, Ontario, Canada
- Simor Hospital, formerly known as the Red Cross Hospital in Esztergom, Hungary
- Huashan Hospital, known as Chinese Red Cross General Hospital from 1907 to 1956, in Shanghai, China
- Maingau Clinic of the Red Cross (est. 1890), in Frankfurt, Germany
- Kaunas Red Cross Hospital, in Lithuania
- Red Cross War Memorial Children's Hospital, in Cape Town, South Africa
- Red Cross Hospital, in Stockholm, Sweden, now part of the Red Cross University College of Nursing
- Netley Red Cross Hospital, a wartime hospital on the grounds of the Netley Hospital (1856-1958), in Hampshire, United Kingdom
- Canadian Red Cross Memorial Hospital (1914-1985), in Taplow, United Kingdom
- Red Cross Hospital, in New York City, United States, now part of New York University Hospital at the New York University School of Medicine
