= North Hastings Hospital =

- Quinte Health

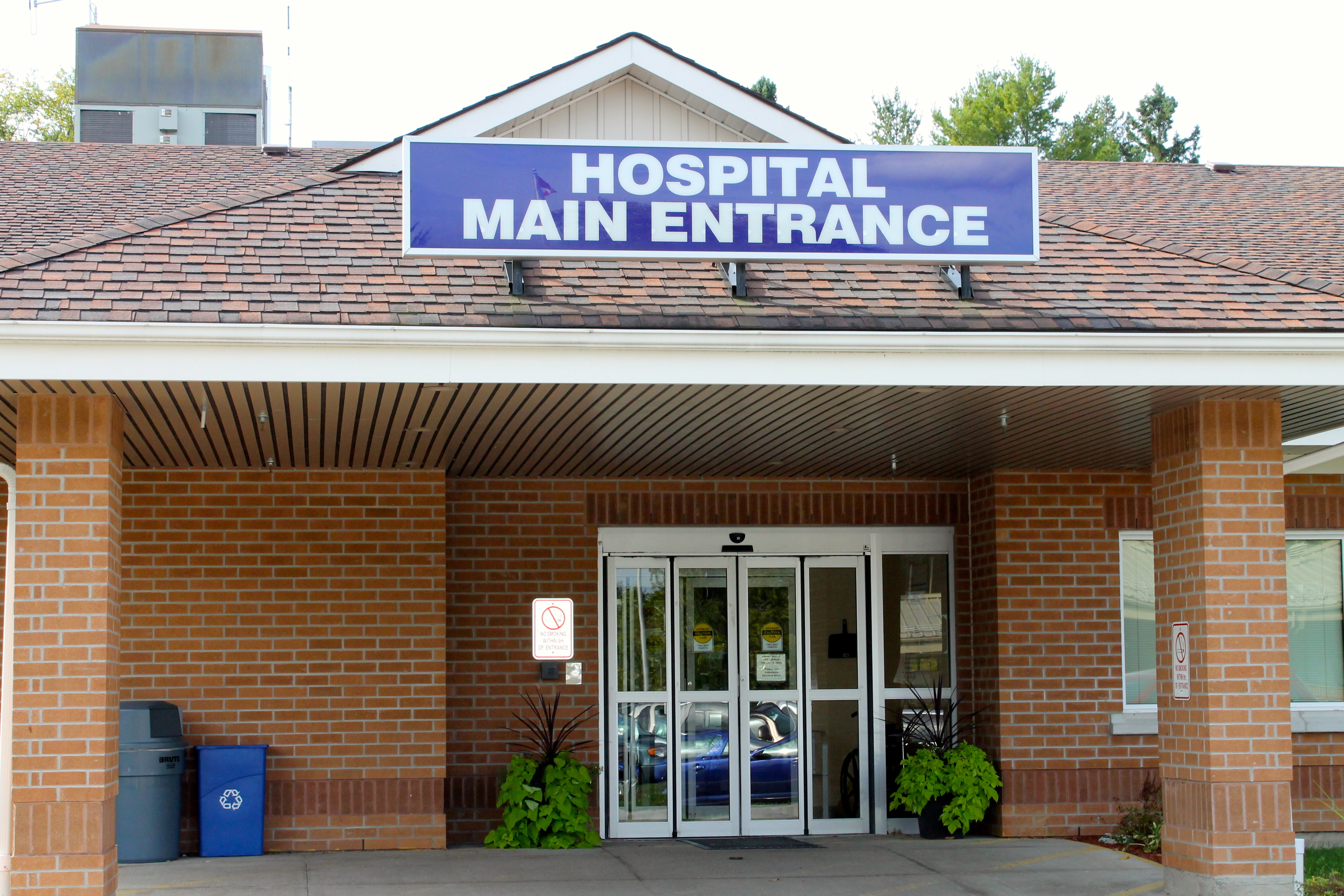

Geography
- Location: Manor Lane, Bancroft, Ontario, Canada
- Coordinates: 45.05528°N 77.86445°W

Organization
- Care system: Government of Ontario
- Type: Community

Services
- Emergency department: Yes
- Beds: 8

Helipads
- Helipad: Yes

History
- Opened: 2022

Links
- Website: quintehealth.ca/hospital/north-hastings-hospital
- Lists: Hospitals in Canada

North Hastings Hospital is a hospital in Bancroft, Ontario, Canada, operated by Quinte Health.

== Description ==
North Hastings Hospital is located at 1-H Manor Lane, Bancroft, Ontario.

It includes eight primary care beds, a 24/7 emergency department, emergency obstetrics, diagnostic imaging and telemedicine services.

The hospital has a nearby helipad, located at Bancroft Airport.

== History ==
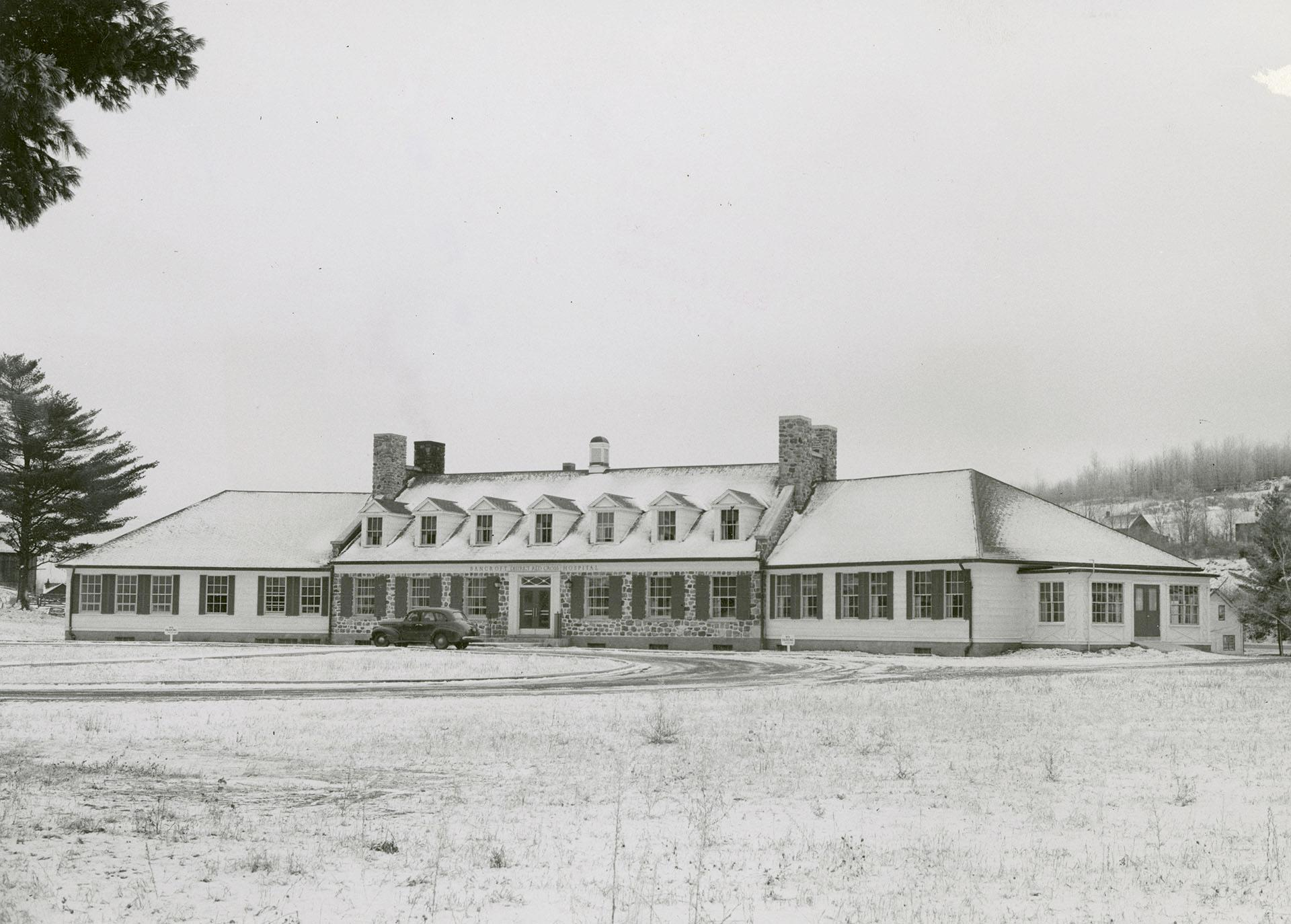
Original hospital building, former location, 1951

=== Former location ===
The hospital started out as a health post in 1927, primarily for treating injuries from local mining activities.

The next hospital was built in 1949 under the name "Red Cross Hospital" supported by the Red Cross.

In 1983, it was merged with Belleville General Hospital and was named as the "North Hastings District Hospital".

An expansion happened in 1985, adding a radiology room, three more stretcher bays, health records and a administrative space.

In 1998, the hospital was known as "Quinte Health Care North Hastings".

=== Move to Manor Lane, Bancroft ===
In April 2002, the new building at 1-H Manor Lane was opened; the building is shared with the Hastings Centennial Manor long term care home.

In 2026, the Government of Ontario announced funding to renovate the hospital's helipad and nurse-call system.
