= North Hastings Public Library =

Canadian library

- 45.0573°N 77.8528°W
- Location: 6 Cleak Avenue, Bancroft, Ontario, Canada

Other information
- Website: northhastingslibrary.ca

North Hastings Public Library is a public library in Bancroft, Ontario, previously known as the Bancroft Public Library.

The original Bancroft Public Library has operated since 1901. It has since relocated at least twice and is now located within the North Hastings Inspiration Place mixed-use community and residential building complex.

== Description ==
North Hastings Public Library is a public library in Bancroft, Ontario, located at 6 Cleak Avenue.

The library serves residents from Faraday Township, Limerick Township, and Bancroft.

== History ==
1925 postcard of Bancroft Community Hall. Inscription "the Hall is where the library is and also the jail"

Bancroft has had a library since 1901. The town's first librarian was Alice Mullett. The original library was known as Bancroft Public Library and was located within the Bancroft Community Hall, which served as the local jail, courthouse and library. The former Bancroft Community Hall is now occupied by Bancroft's Village Playhouse. In 1903, the library was one of eight libraries in Hastings County, along with libraries in Belleville, Delora, Desoronto, Madoc, Marlbank, Trenton and Tweed. In 1903, the library held between 250 and 500 volumes.

After relocating from the old town hall, the library operated from 14 Flint Avenue, Bancroft.

In 2019, the library was renamed as North Hastings Public Library after the Town of Bancroft signed agreements with Limerick Township and the Faraday Township.

In 2021, Daryl Kramp MP announced funding for a new library building. A plaque "in grateful recognition of Daryl Kramp" was unveiled outside the library in September 2026.

Kim McMunn was the head librarian in 2022 Debbie Dalley held the role 2024. In 2026, the library's CEO was Kate Harris. In 2026, Jane Graham was the chair of the library's board of directors.

The library relocated to the ground floor of North Hastings Inspiration Place multi-use complex in 2026 and held its first public event in November 2026.

== North Hastings Inspiration Place ==
North Hastings Inspiration Place is a joint venture between a property developer and the Town of Bancroft. The project is linked to the Town of Bancroft's 2022-2023 Mainstreet Makeover project. The project was led by local politicians who made proposals to higher level of governments, aligned with their funding priorities.

In his PhD thesis, scholar William Bedford of York University argued that "the political currency of affordable housing provision was critical in getting the NHIP project off the ground."

The new new 5,000 square-foot multi-use library, community space, and affordable housing project is known as North Hastings Inspiration Place, and is located on Cleak Street. The new location is planned to incorporate 40 affordable residential units. The new project is a partnership between Rural Roots Property Developments Inc. and the Town of Bancroft. The original development partner, Springale Developments, withdrew from the project. The library redevelopment project was supported by $500,034 from the Town of Bancroft, $749,960 from the Government of Canada, and $624,904 from the Government of Ontario. Faraday Township declined to make $35,880 donation to the library in 2026, citing budgetary concerns and property tax implications.
