= Bancroft Gem and Mineral Museum =

Canadian mineralogy museum

- Museum and Town of Bancroft municipal office

- Museum location in Southern Ontario
- Established: 1985
- Location: Bancroft, Ontario, Canada
- Coordinates: 45.05992°N 77.85915°W
- Type: Mineralogy
- Collection size: 1,000+ mineral specimens
- Founders: Frank Melanson and Wendy Melanson
- Curator: Wendy Melanson
- Owners: Bancroft Gem and Mineral Club
- Website: bancroftmineralmuseum.ca

The Bancroft Gem and Mineral Museum, historically known as the Bancroft Mineral Museum is a is a mineralogy museum in Bancroft, Ontario. Bancroft is known as the Mineral Capital of Canada.

The museum was opened in 1985 and is operated by the Bancroft Gem and Mineral Club.

== Location ==
The museum is located 8 Hastings Heritage Way, Bancroft, Ontario within the town's former railway station, and the museum shares the building with the town's municipal offices.

The museum is located near to the North Hastings Heritage Museum, Riverside Park and the CN Rock Pile.

== Background, local geology ==
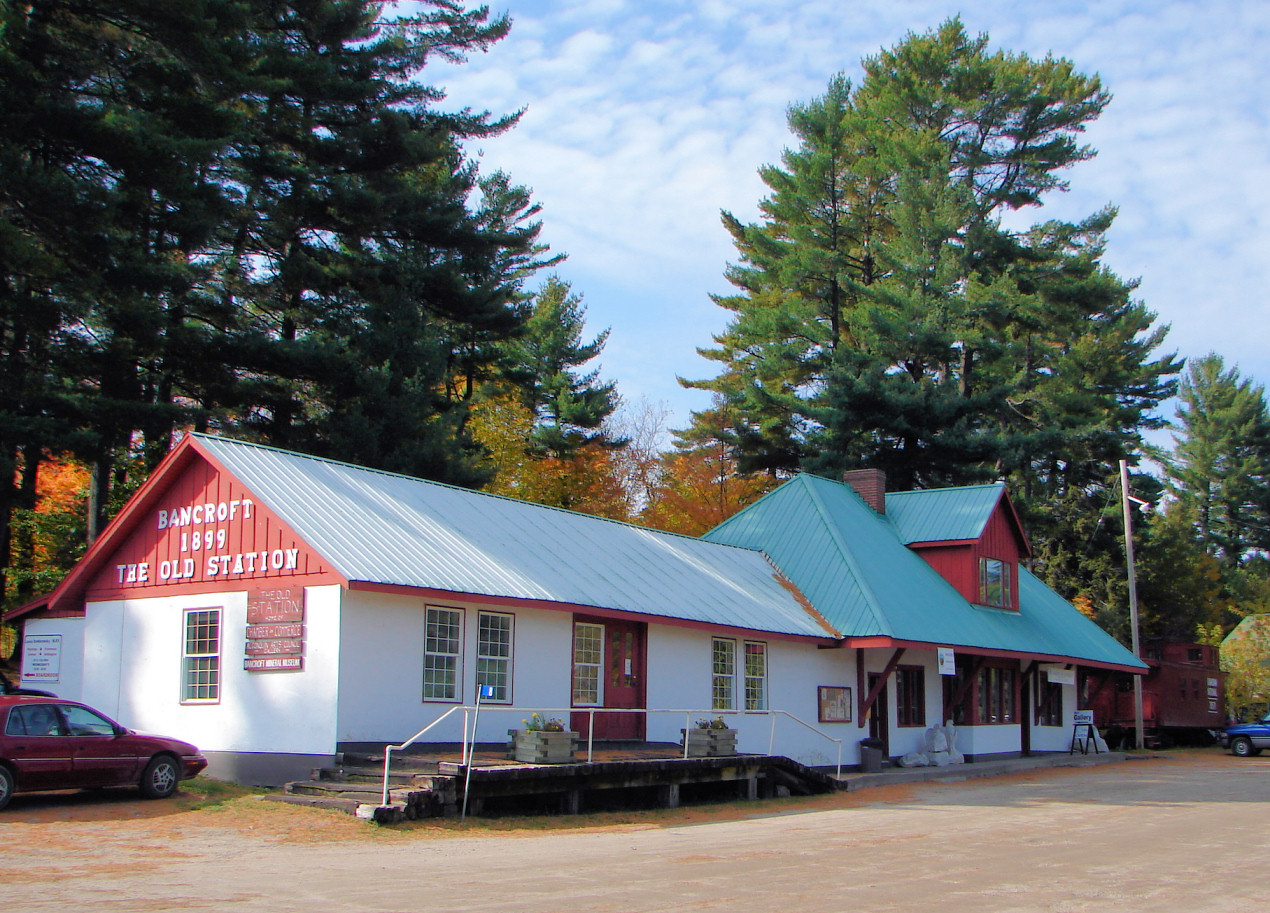
Museum building, 2006

The geology of Bancroft attracts amateur geologists and rock collectors from around the world. Bancroft has moniker of the "Mineral Capital of Canada".

Bancroft Gem and Mineral Club (founded at the Bancroft Mineral Society) was established in 1960, and helped open the museum in 1985.

Frank Melanson (born 1937, Moncton, New Brunswick) and Wendy (née Hawthorneden) Melanson (born 1939, Kirkland Lake) established the museum. The couple were international mineral dealers and operated the Hawthorneden mineral dealership for over 40 years.

Museum curator Wendy Melanson has coordinated the annual Gem and Mineral Show. In 2025, the show exhibited in Peterborough and Bancroft. Proceeds of the show have been used to fund the museum.

== History ==
The museum opened in 1985 in a municipally owned building at 32 Station Street, Bancroft after community fundraising by Frank and Wendy Melanson.

The museum was relocated from to the same building that houses Bancroft's municipal offices Hastings Heritage Way, to make way for the opening of Bancroft Community Transit. The new location was renovated in 2013, with funding from FedDev Ontario.

Exhibits have included work by artist Renee Paterson.

In 2015, the museum's board chair was Mike Daly.

A commemorative plaque recognizing Frank and Wendy Melanson's financial contributions and work to launch the museum was unveiled in September 2026. The plaque was presented to the Melansons by Bancroft mayor Paul Jenkins on behalf of the Town of Bancroft.

== Description ==
The 1,200 square-foot museum has an extensive display of rocks, collected from within a 150 kilometre radius of Bancroft. Displays include over 1,000 minerals specimens, including apatite, orthoclase and biotite. The mine also features an underground uranium mining scene. Museum displays include maps of the region's geology, which includes the Grenville province.

The museum is operated by the Bancroft Gem and Mineral Club. Wendy Melanson is the museum's curator.

The museum costs $5 to visit and is open from Monday to Friday.

== See also ==
- Bancroft Rockhound Gemboree
- Uranium mining in the Bancroft area
