= Mary Milne =

- Origin: Ontario, Canada
- Occupation: Singer-songwriter
- Website: www.therealmarymilne.com

Mary Milne is a singer-songwriter from Bancroft, Ontario and Toronto, Ontario. A self-taught musician and producer, Milne is known for her unique voice which has been described as "wonderfully imprecise".

Her first demo, Sister Rodeo, was released in 2006 followed by the EP Don't You Know I Love The Leavin' in 2009. In 2011, her song "Already Gone" from the Canadian feature film The Trotsky won a Genie Award for Best Achievement in Music - Original Song.

From 2012 to 2016, her song "Shadows and Lights" was used in an international ad campaign for Ikea. In 2018, her song "On Your Side" was used in a commercial for Mercedes-Benz.

In 2017, she worked with Diabetes Canada and music production house Eggplant Collective crafting the words of people suffering from diabetes into the song "Brave Faces" as part of the Canadian diabetes association rebranding into Diabetes Canada.

Milne worked for MooseFM in Bancroft.

She is the granddaughter of Canadian painter David Milne.
