= Bancroft, Ontario =

Bancroft
- Town (lower-tier)
- Town of Bancroft
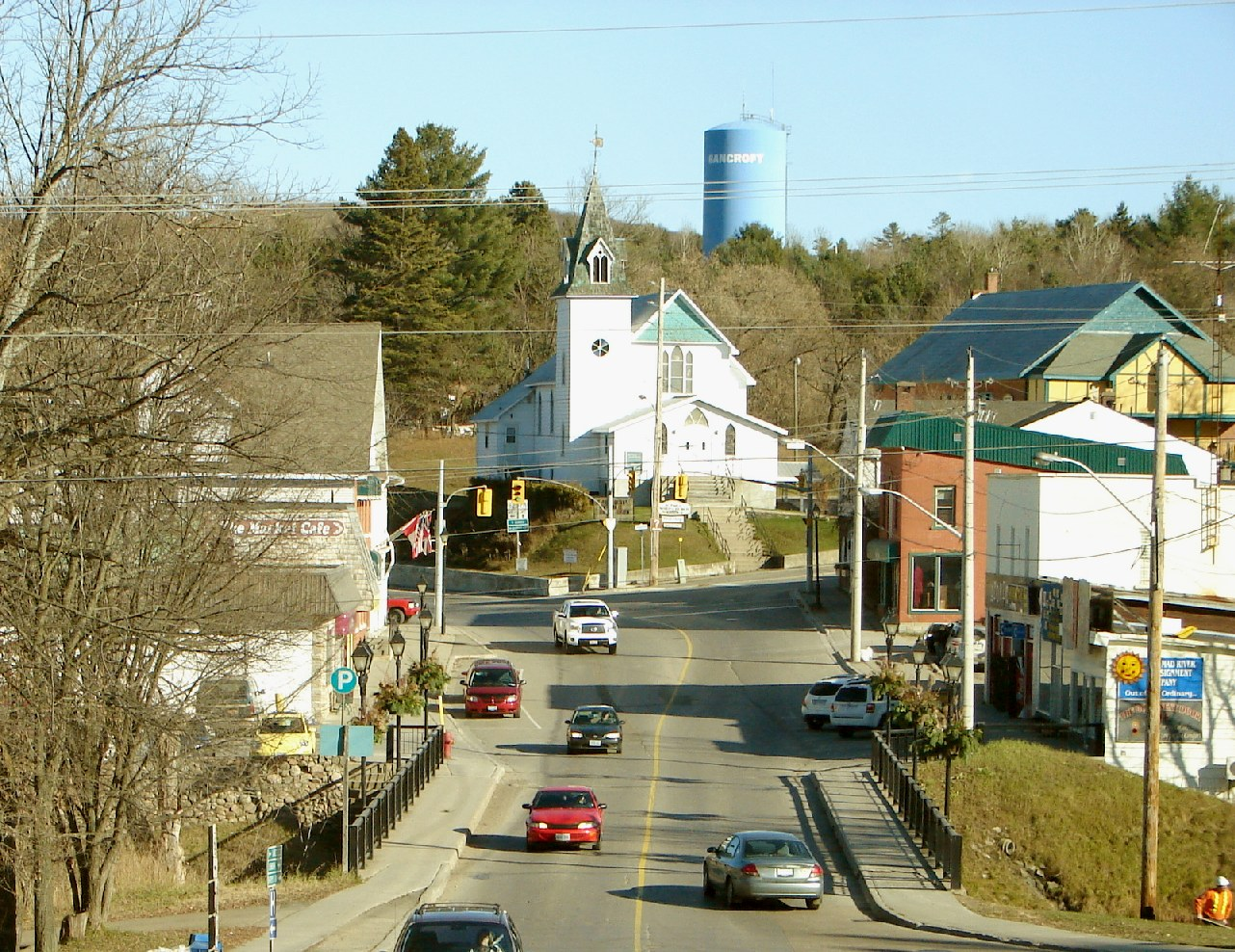
- Bancroft sign Downtown Bancroft
- Motto: Mineral Capital of Canada
- Location within Southern Ontario
- Coordinates: 45°03′N 77°51′W
- Country: Canada
- Province: Ontario
- County: Hastings
- Established: 1861 (as York River)
- Renamed: 1879 (to Bancroft)
- Incorporated: 1904
- Amalgamated, Incorporated as a Town: 1999
- Named for: Elizabeth Ann Bancroft
- Seat: Bancroft Municipal Offices

Government
  - Type: Mayor–council government
  - Mayor: Paul Jenkins
  - Council: Bancroft Town Council: Bancroft Ward, Dungannon Ward
  - Fed. riding: Hastings—Lennox and Addington—Tyendinaga
  - Prov. riding: Hastings—Lennox and Addington

Area
  - Land: 227.54 km^{2} (87.85 sq mi)
- Elevation: 328 m (1,076 ft)

Population (2021)
  - Total: 4,065
  - Density: 17.9/km^{2} (46/sq mi)
- Time zone: UTC−5 (EST)
  - Summer (DST): UTC−4 (EDT)
- Postal Code: K0L 1C0
- Area codes: 613 and 343
- Geocode: 3512061 (Statistics Canada)
- ISO 3166 code: CA-ON
- Website: bancroft.ca

Bancroft (/ˈbæŋkrɒft/) is the most populus town in Hastings County, in the Canadian province of Ontario. (Note: Belleville and Quinte West are outside the administrative region of Hastings County) It is located on the York River and has a population of 4,065 as of 2021. Bancroft is known as the Mineral Capital of Canada and is the economic hub of the North Hastings region. The town serves regional population is 60,000 and hosts 150,000 annual visitors to Bancroft.

The Baptiste family of Algonquin people moved to Baptiste Lake, near Bancroft in the early 1800s.The first settlers were from the United Kingdom, and United Empire Loyalists fleeing the American Revolution. Other people arrived to seek land, and Irish immigrants arrived, fleeing the potato famine. The village was known as York River in the 1860s, changing to Bancroft in 1879.

From the mid-1950s to about 1982, mining was the primary industry. A village until 1999, Bancroft merged with Dungannon Township to form the Town of Bancroft.

== History ==
=== Indigenous history 18th century ===
In her book Bancroft: In Quest of Yesterday, local historian Nila Reynolds describes conflicts involving the Ojibwe, Odawa, Potawatomi and Mississaugas in the Bancroft zarea between approximately 1718 and the 1740s. According to Reynolds, the nations conducted military campaigns against the Haudenosaunee in an effort to drive them south. The threat of revenge from the Mississauga nation left North Hastings unsafe for Algonquins until the Iroquois were assigned reservations at Tyendewaga in the late 1700s."

Historian D. Peter MacLeod, writing in the Canadian Historical Review in 1992, examined nineteenth-century accounts of Anishinaabe oral histories. He identified warfare against the Haudenosaunee in southern Ontario as one of three major conflicts preserved in Anishinaabe historical traditions. These accounts, recorded by Indigenous writers including George Copway, Peter Jones and Andrew Blackbird, describe Anishinaabe territorial expansion into southern Ontario and the expulsion of Haudenosaunee forces. MacLeod also noted that these historical narratives emphasized military campaigns and territorial expansion, while giving comparatively little attention to periods of peace and cooperation.

=== Baptiste family arrival (1800s to 1850) ===
In the early 1800s, Jean Baptiste Kijicho Manitou, a Nipissing chief moved from Lake of Two Mountains to Kaijick Lake (later renamed as Baptiste Lake).

By 1823, the government had purchased nearly two million acres of land from the Chippewa and Mississauga First Nations including a tract on the York River in Hastings County which had been established in 1792.

Lieutenant-General Robert Walpole was one of the first Europeans to visit the area, having explored it by canoe in 1827. Charles Shirref explored the area in 1829, and noted the Baptiste family on Lake Baptiste. Explorer David Thompson visited in 1835.

=== European settlement (1850s to 1900) ===
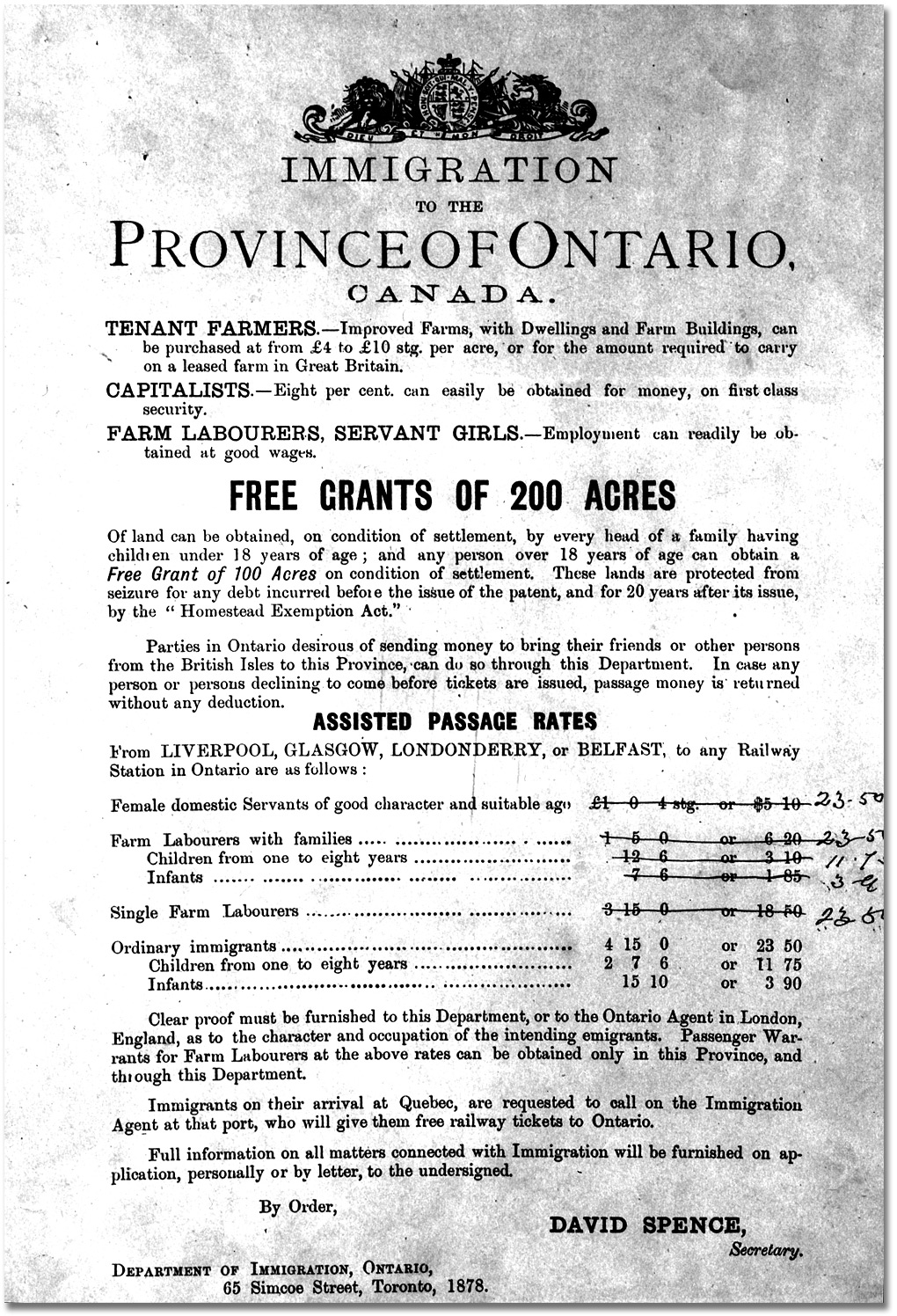
Ontario Immigration Poster (1878)

In the mid 1850s, the government placed advertisements in the United Kingdom and in Canadian cities to invite people to relocate to the area, offering 100 free acres of land. Arriving settlers included Brits, United Empire Loyalists fleeing the American Revolution. Others arrived to seek land and Irish immigrants arrived, fleeing the potato famine. Settlers were required to clear their lot, cultivate at least 12 acres, build a log home, occupy it for four years. The newly arriving settlers, were supported by Jean Baptiste Kijicho Manitou's family helped create space for European settlers, providing them with midwifery services and guiding them fish and hunt and get medicine.

Indigenous residents occupied lands around L'Amable Lake, LeVallee Rapids, while the Baptiste, Benoirs, White Ducks, and Bernards lives on Baptiste Lake. Later, most of them moved to the Golden Lake reserve, while the Baptiste families remained on Baptiste Lake.

The first settler family to live in Bancroft were the Clarks in 1853, did so to take advantage of the fur trade. Early settlers included James Cleak and Alfred Barker from England who arrived in 1855, settling on Quarry Lake. They got jobs in administration; Cleak opened a small store and Barker became the town's first postmaster. Of the wave of Irish immigrants who arrived from 1856-61, the first was Patrick Kavanagh, who lived with his brother Dermot (Darby) Kavanagh. Other Irish families arriving included the Spurrs, Taits, Powers, McLeans, Kellys and Finnegans. Many Irish immigrants moved to Maynooth. Aside from farming, of the residents also sold furs, obtained through trapping. Over the years the European settlement grew quickly to house 89 families by 1868. Lumber companies arrived to remove timber.

Several colonization roads were built to the settlement in the 1850s–70s, opening up the lands along the way to further settlement. The Hastings Road ran north. It was joined at Bancroft by the Mississippi Road running northwest from Plevna in Frontenac County and the Monck Road running west from Atherley on Lake Couchiching. This made Bancroft (then still known as York Mills) a significant crossroads.

The settlement had various names over the first years, York Mills, York River and York Branch. When the post office opened in 1861, it was called York River.

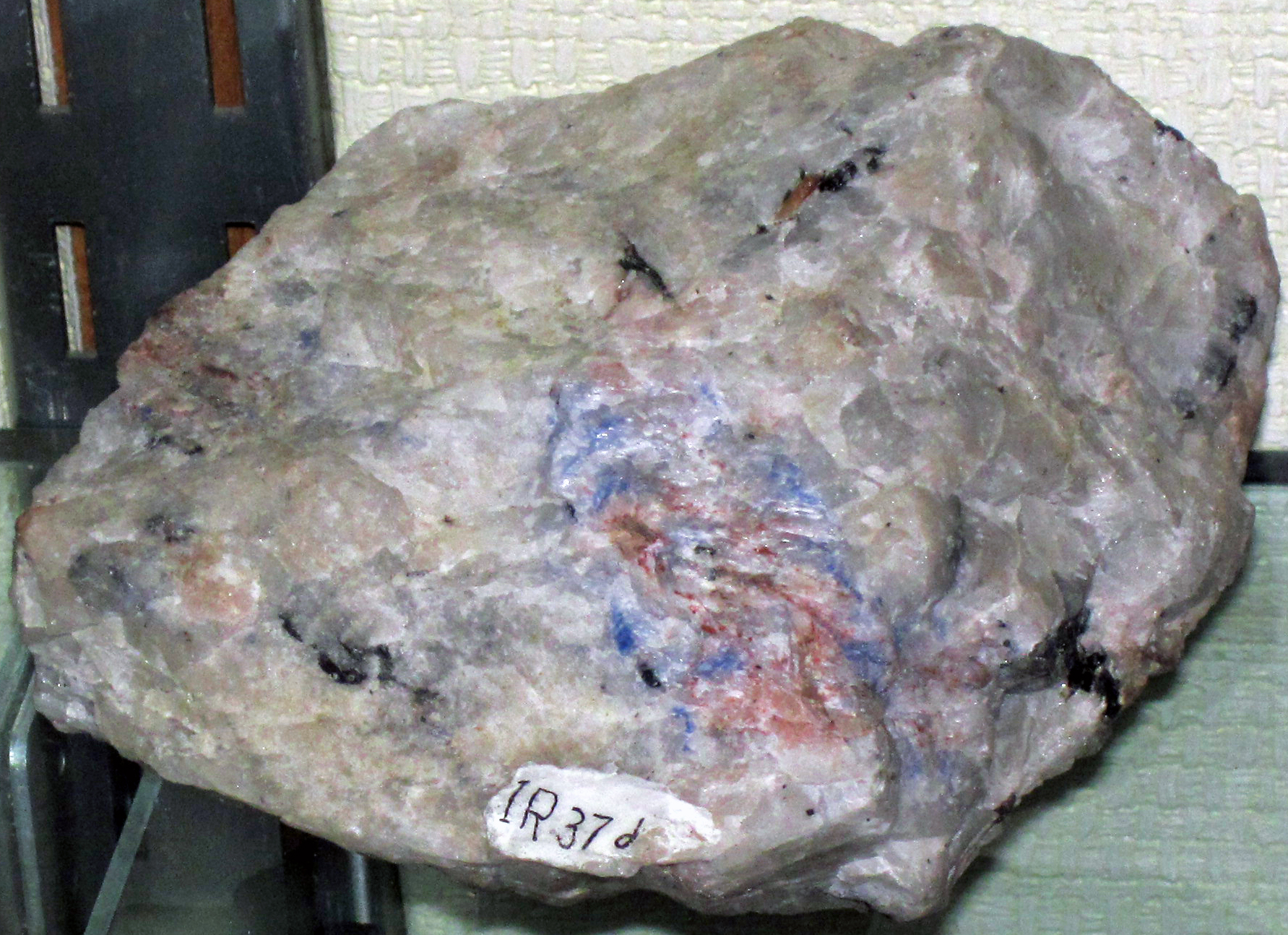
Blue sodalite, surrounded by nepheline (grey) and feldspar (white) from Bancroft

A grist mill opened in 1865, gold was discovered in 1866 and other minerals would be discovered later. The discovery of sodalite by Frank Dawson Adams in 1892 led to the opening of the Princess Sodalite Mine.

In 1870, schools were opened in L’Amable (now Bancroft) and nearby settlement of Umfraville. The first church was opened the same year.

Billa Flint and his wife Phoebe Sawyer (née Clement), 1880s

In 1879, the name of the settlement was changed to Bancroft by Senator Billa Flint (married to Phoebe Sawyer (née Clement)), after his mother in law Elizabeth Ann Bancroft. Flint's request to change the name had been with resistance of the local community, but their petitions to government were unsuccessful. Flint convinced tradesmen to move to the area, which helped to attract more European settlers. A woollen mill began operating in 1884.

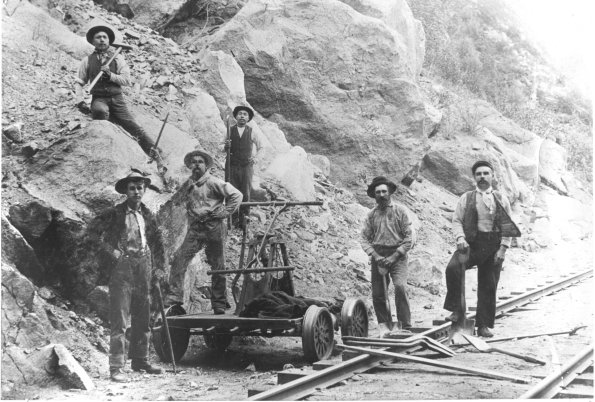
A crew works a rock cut on the Irondale, Bancroft & Ottawa Railway just north of Bancroft c. 1895.

The CN train station was built around 1883 to 1884. The Central Ontario Railway arrived in November 1900, connecting Bancroft with Trenton. The railway went through the Musclow-Greenview Road and extended behind Birds Creek through a back trail and continued through the town eventually going further away from the town at the 'Y' road division. The Bancroft, Irondale and Ottawa Railway connected Bancroft with Kinmount, Ontario. The line was purchased by the Canadian Northern Ontario Railway which became part of the Canadian National Railways in 1918. The line was abandoned in 1965 and subsequently removed to make way for a recreational trail.

Construction on Methodist and Presbyterian churches started around 1870.

Alexander Francis Chamberlain's spent time spent around the Algonquin community of about 20 people that lived Baptiste Lake and noted an isolated Mohawk community nearby. His guide, Fançois (Algonquin Panā/sawak Ekwō'satsh) was married with two sons, including John (aged 25). Fançois built birch-bark canoes.

=== Industrial times (1900s to 2000) ===
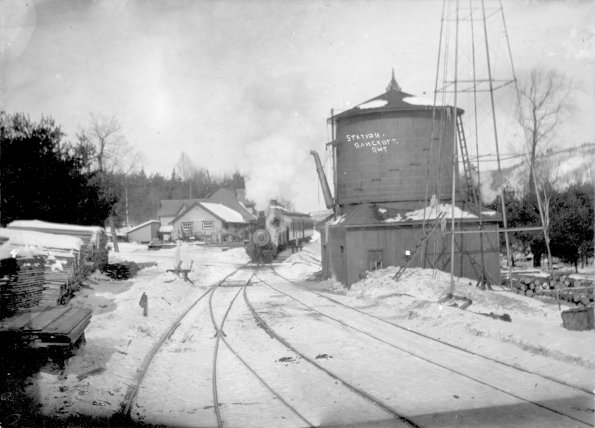
Central Ontario Railway c. 1910.

The Central Ontario Railway arrived in 1900. In 1903, the Irondale, Bancroft and Ottawa Railway connected to the COR north of town at what is now Y Road, referring to the wye junction joining the two lines. They were beneficial in transporting settlers and goods; the railway would closed in 1982.

Bancroft was incorporated as a village in December 1904.

1925 postcard depicting Bancroft

The first telephone in the village was at the railway station; it was connected in 1905.

Bancroft's first public health care was opened in 1927, when a health post was opened in response to injuries in the mining industry.

The old Bancroft Theatre, at 16 Bridge Street West, 1950

Electricity became available in 1930.

North Hastings High School was opened in 1947.

The Red Cross Hospital opened in 1949.

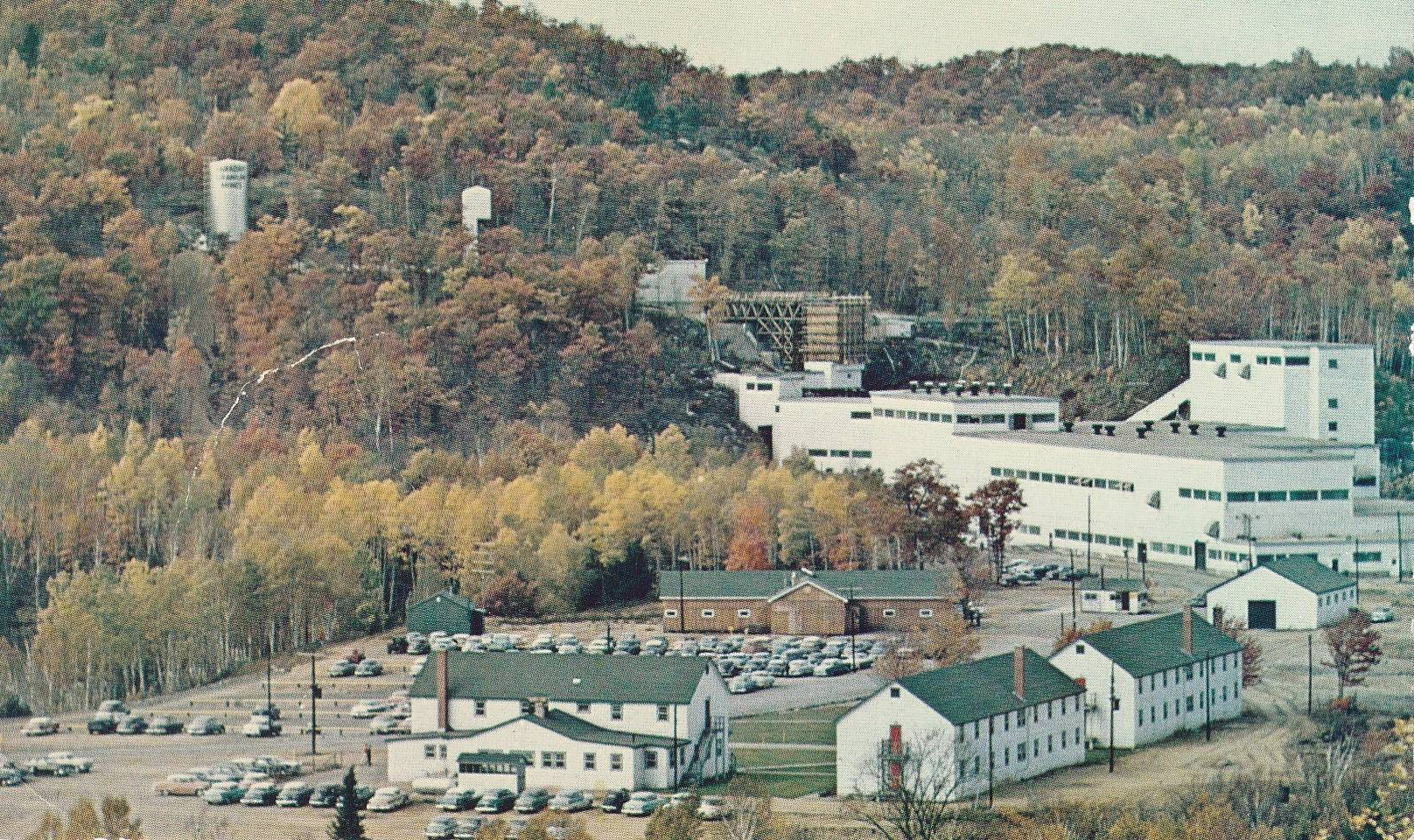
Madawaska Mine, 1962

Uranium was discovered in 1949 and construction of Faraday Mine started in 1952. Faraday Mine was later renamed Madawaska Mine and operated until 1982. Other minerals were also mined over the years. The closing of the mine caused economic hardship.

In the 1950's and 1960's the Bancroft had a drive-in and a conventional cinema theatre managed by licensee G. E. Broughton. The theatre was located at 15 Bridge Street West.

The municipal offices of Bancroft were opened at 24 Flint Street in 1962.

During the Vietnam War, U.S. draft dodger Bruce Beyer lived on a 100 acre farm in Bancroft from 1972 to 1977.

In 1983, the Red Cross Hospital was merged with Belleville General Hospital and was renamed as "North Hastings District Hospital".

The Ontario Municipal Board approved a request for Bancroft village to become a town on August 9, 1995, with Bancroft Council bylaw 649-95 confirming the new status on 28 August 1995. In 1999, Bancroft merged with Dungannon Township to form the Town of Bancroft.

=== Post-mining years (2000s to present) ===
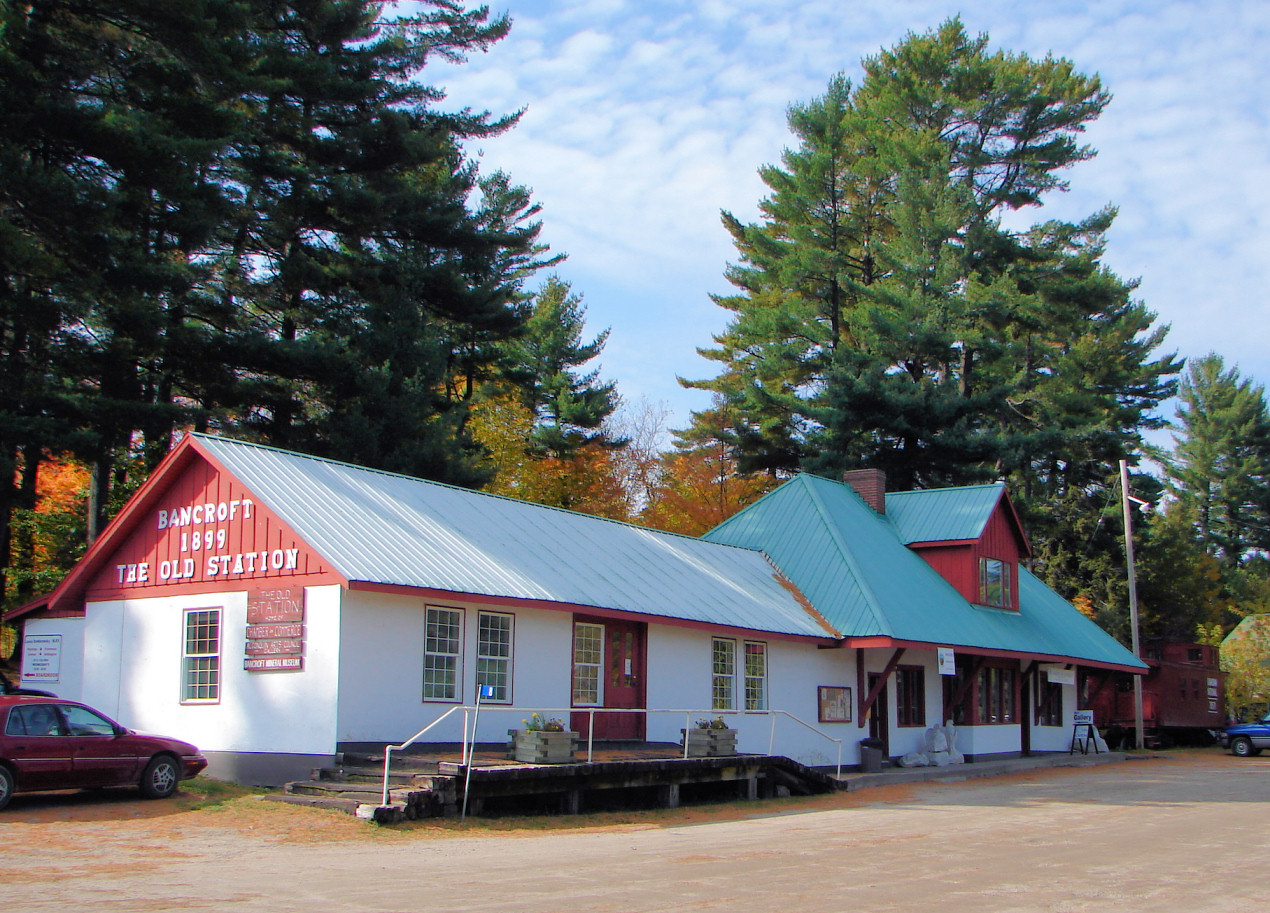
Old train station (in 2006)

In 2004, Bancroft won TVO's "Most Talented Town in Ontario" contest. The old train station in Bancroft served as the Chamber of Commerce and Mineral Museum until it was condemned in 2008. The Chamber of Commerce, Mineral Museum, and Art Gallery of Bancroft relocated to other sites in the town. In 2011, the old station was moved onto a new foundation; it was restored with an addition at the southern end of the building to house the Bancroft Gem and Mineral museum and a caboose, which is not in use.

1925 postcard showing the former public school in Bancroft

Bancroft Public School was closed in 2011 and merged with North Hastings Senior Elementary School, which was renamed as York River Public School.

The municipal offices were relocated to the former railway station located at 7 Hastings Heritage Way, in 2017.

Paul Jenkins was elected as Mayor in the October 2018 municipal election. He was reelected in 2022. Tracy McGibbon was elected as mayor in 2026.

== Geography and geology ==
Bancroft's census sub division covers 228 square kilometres and includes the settlements of Maxwell, Vardy, Bronson, Bancroft, Bowen Corner, Deltor, Egan Creek, L'Amable, Nobbs Siding, and Turriff.

During the most recent ice age, in the area of that is now Bancroft, ancient glaciers removed soil and rock, exposing the Precambrian granite that had been the heart of volcanic mountains on an ancient sea bed. During the Grenville orogenies, sedimentary rocks were transformed by heat and pressure into banded gneiss and marble, incorporating gabbro and diorite (rich in iron and other dark minerals). Uranium ores in these structures are about 1,000 - 1,200 million years old.

Bancroft is located in the Grenville Province and has small quantities of uranium-thorium-rare earth element in granitic pegmatite which appear in numerous locations around the area. Bancroft is unusual as one of the limited global locations where uranium was extracted from intrusive rocks, notably the only one from the pegmatite type.

=== Climate ===
Climate data for Bancroft (1991–2020 normals, extremes 1882–present)
Month	Jan	Feb	Mar	Apr	May	Jun	Jul	Aug	Sep	Oct	Nov	Dec	Year
Record high °C (°F)	11.7 (53.1)	13.0 (55.4)	27.1 (80.8)	30.0 (86.0)	33.4 (92.1)	35.0 (95.0)	37.8 (100.0)	36.1 (97.0)	33.9 (93.0)	27.9 (82.2)	23.9 (75.0)	16.0 (60.8)	37.8 (100.0)
Mean daily maximum °C (°F)	−4.5 (23.9)	−2.1 (28.2)	3.3 (37.9)	10.5 (50.9)	18.9 (66.0)	23.1 (73.6)	25.7 (78.3)	24.5 (76.1)	20.4 (68.7)	12.5 (54.5)	5.0 (41.0)	−1.6 (29.1)	11.3 (52.3)
Daily mean °C (°F)	−10.9 (12.4)	−9.3 (15.3)	−3.7 (25.3)	3.7 (38.7)	11.1 (52.0)	16.0 (60.8)	18.4 (65.1)	17.3 (63.1)	13.1 (55.6)	6.7 (44.1)	0.0 (32.0)	−6.9 (19.6)	4.6 (40.3)
Mean daily minimum °C (°F)	−17.1 (1.2)	−16.4 (2.5)	−10.4 (13.3)	−3.1 (26.4)	3.3 (37.9)	8.8 (47.8)	11.0 (51.8)	9.9 (49.8)	5.9 (42.6)	0.9 (33.6)	−4.9 (23.2)	−11.9 (10.6)	−2.0 (28.4)
Record low °C (°F)	−43.9 (−47.0)	−42.2 (−44.0)	−38.3 (−36.9)	−23.3 (−9.9)	−10.0 (14.0)	−5.0 (23.0)	0.0 (32.0)	−1.7 (28.9)	−6.7 (19.9)	−16.7 (1.9)	−28.3 (−18.9)	−41.1 (−42.0)	−43.9 (−47.0)
Average precipitation mm (inches)	60.9 (2.40)	53.1 (2.09)	65.8 (2.59)	63.5 (2.50)	81.7 (3.22)	89.8 (3.54)	73.8 (2.91)	86.2 (3.39)	90.6 (3.57)	78.3 (3.08)	83.8 (3.30)	77.4 (3.05)	905.1 (35.63)
Average rainfall mm (inches)	12.5 (0.49)	17.1 (0.67)	37.6 (1.48)	53.7 (2.11)	80.9 (3.19)	89.8 (3.54)	73.8 (2.91)	86.2 (3.39)	90.6 (3.57)	75.4 (2.97)	63.9 (2.52)	27.9 (1.10)	709.5 (27.93)
Average snowfall cm (inches)	47.8 (18.8)	36.0 (14.2)	28.2 (11.1)	9.8 (3.9)	0.8 (0.3)	0 (0)	0 (0)	0 (0)	0 (0)	2.9 (1.1)	20.0 (7.9)	49.1 (19.3)	194.6 (76.6)
Average precipitation days (≥ 0.2 mm)	11	9	11	10	11	12	11	11	11	12	12	12	134
Average rainy days (≥ 0.2 mm)	2	2	6	9	11	12	11	11	11	12	9	3	99
Average snowy days (≥ 0.2 cm)	10	8	6	2	0	0	0	0	0	0	4	9	39
Average relative humidity (%) (at 15:00 LST)	70.3	61.8	52.6	50.4	48.6	55.2	54.2	56.8	59.0	64.1	70.7	75.6	59.9
Source: Environment Canada (precipitation/rainfall/snowfall 1961–1990)

== Demographics ==
In 1931 the population was 911 people, growing significantly when the uranium mines opened.

In the 2021 Census of Population conducted by Statistics Canada, Bancroft had a population of 4,065 living in 1,801 of its 2,007 total private dwellings, a change of 4.7% from its 2016 population of 3,881. With a land area of 227.54 km^{2} (87.85 sq mi), it had a population density of 17.9/km^{2} (46.3/sq mi) in 2021.

Canada census – Bancroft community profile

	2021	2016	2011
Population	4,065 (+4.7% from 2016)	3,881 (0.0% from 2011)	3,880 (+1.1% from 2006)
Land area	227.54 km^{2} (87.85 sq mi)	229.51 km^{2} (88.61 sq mi)	229.56 km^{2} (88.63 sq mi)
Population density	17.9/km^{2} (46/sq mi)	16.9/km^{2} (44/sq mi)	16.9/km^{2} (44/sq mi)
Median age	56.0 (M: 54.4, F: 57.2)	53.4 (M: 52.5, F: 54.3)	49.4 (M: 47.9, F: 50.8)
Private dwellings	2,007 (total) 1,801 (occupied)	1944 (total)	1896 (total)
Median household income	$57,200

References: 2021 2016 2011

Historical census populations – Bancroft, Ontario

Year	Pop.	±%
1901	554	—
1911	625	+12.8%
1921	768	+22.9%
1931	911	+18.6%
1941	1,094	+20.1%
1951	1,334	+21.9%
1956	1,669	+25.1%

Year	Pop.	±%
1961	2,615	+56.7%
1966	2,152	−17.7%
1971	2,276	+5.8%
1976	2,332	+2.5%
1981	2,329	−0.1%
1986	2,363	+1.5%
1991	2,383	+0.8%

Year	Pop.	±%
1996	2,554	+7.2%
2001	4,089	+60.1%
2006	3,838	−6.1%
2011	3,880	+1.1%
2016	3,881	+0.0%
2021	4,065	+4.7%

Population counts are not adjusted for boundary changes or merger.
Source: Statistics Canada

Historical census populations – Dungannon Township

Year	Pop.	±%
1881	578	—
1891	754	+30.4%
1901	867	+15.0%
1911	788	−9.1%
1921	734	−6.9%
1931	758	+3.3%

Year	Pop.	±%
1941	790	+4.2%
1951	695	−12.0%
1956	833	+19.9%
1961	1,113	+33.6%
1966	901	−19.0%
1971	822	−8.8%

Year	Pop.	±%
1976	1,151	+40.0%
1981	1,135	−1.4%
1986	1,190	+4.8%
1991	1,412	+18.7%
1996	1,526	+8.1%

Dissolved and merged with Bancroft in 1999.
Source: Statistics Canada

=== Languages spoken ===
Languages spoken mother tongue languages spoken in Bancroft in 2021 were:

- English as first language: 94.2%
- French as first language: 1.2%
- English and French as first language: 0.3%
- Other as first language: 3.9%

Other than French and English, the most common languages spoken at home in Bancroft in 2021 were Gujarati, Polish, and Punjabi. German was also spoken regularly.

== Economy ==
Bancroft is the economy hub for North Hastings and has a catchment area of approximately 60,000 people. It hosts 150,000 annual tourists that spend $19.5 million.

Poverty in Bancroft is high, compared to the rest of Ontario.

Housing costs in Bancroft doubled from 2019 to 2021. In 2021, Bancroft was ranked as the best place to buy housing, and the average house price in Bancroft was calculated to be 47% below the national average, in the Zoocasa Average Price Index.

Once a mining town, tourism is now a major industry due to the nearby presence of lakes and recreational facilities.

== Tourism ==
Bancroft provides nature tourism, especially birders, and all-terrain vehicle riders.

=== Amateur geology ===
The unique geology of Bancroft attracts rock collectors from around the world. The town has moniker of the "Mineral Capital of Canada".

Rockhound Gemboree (2013)

The CN Rock Pile is located at 5 Sherbourne Street, 200 metres from the municipal offices. It consists of rocks left over from the construction of the CN railway, taken from the Golden-Keene Quarry.

The Bancroft Mineral Society was founded in 1960. Since 1963, Bancroft has hosted the Bancroft Rockhound Gemboree. The annual event attracts mineral vendors from across Canada, the US and South Africa.

=== Events ===
Hilly Hundred cycling event (2010)

The town hosts annual events the November Rally of the Tall Pines, the Hastings Highlands Hilly Hundred fall cycling event.

Bancroft hosts the annual Indigenous Expo which event features Indigenous artists and artisans. The is a non-profit event organized by Trevor Minnie of the Kijicho Manito Madaouskarini First Nation. It is held in the North Hastings Community Centre. The 2025 event was held on July 19th and 20th, and had 2,700 visitors. Admission cost $5 for those over 14 years of age. The 2026 event was held on on July the 18th and 19th.

=== Theatre and arts ===
1925 postcard showing the former Bancroft Community hall (now Tweed & Company Theatre

The town is home to the Village Playhouse, a theatre which has been hosting sold out plays, musicals and concerts since the early 1990s. Formerly the Bancroft Community Hall, the historical building was once the local jail, court house and library.

The Art Gallery of Bancroft hosts 11-12 exhibitions per year celebrating the work of local and regional artists and artisans. These exhibitions include the popular annual "Juried Show" and the annual student show displaying the work of four regional high schools. The gallery gift shop displays the paintings and fine crafts of area artists and the Art Gallery of Bancroft boasts a permanent collection including some of Ontario's finest artists.

A Place For the Arts is an artist's cooperative and art gallery located in the town centre.

=== Museums and libraries ===
The North Hastings Public Library serves residents from Faraday Township, Limerick Township, and Bancroft. New library premises located on Cleak Street and Hastings Street North are planned to open in the Spring of 2027.

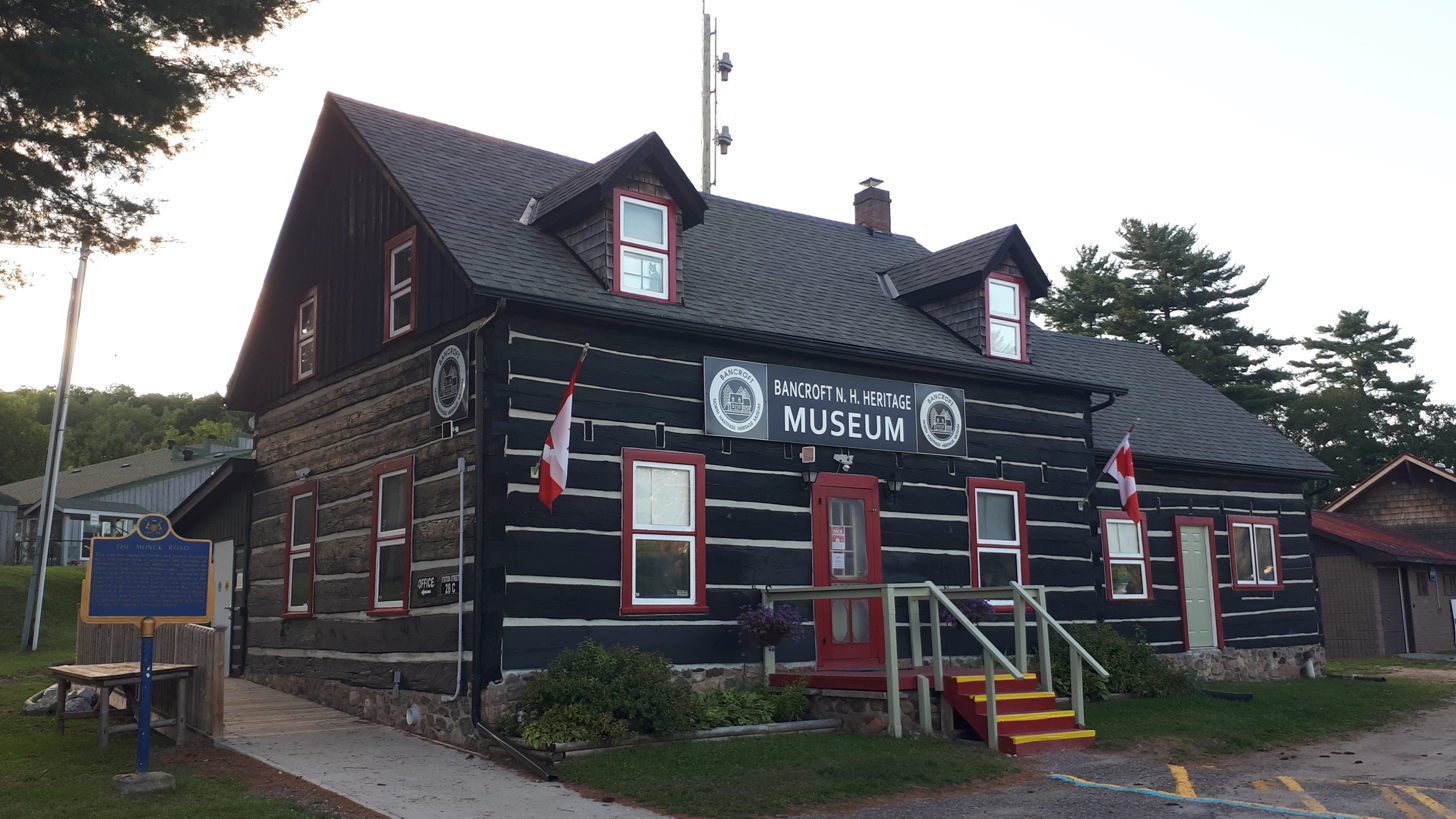
Bancroft North Hastings Heritage Museum

The 5,000 square-foot multi-use library, community space, and affordable housing project is known as North Hastings Inspiration Place. The new location is planned to incorporate 40 affordable residential units.

The town hosts the North Hastings Heritage Museum, the Bancroft Gem and Mineral Museum, and the Canadian Peace Museum.

== Parks ==
Freedom Skate Park

Parks in Bancroft include Freedom Skate Park, Cenotaph Park, and Riverside Park, and the Off-Leash Dog Park, near the Community Centre.

Off-leash dog park

Shawashkong Millennium Park (2013)

Churchill Park is located on the York River. The park was originally named Sparrow Park, after the Sparrow family who settled the area. It was renamed after former Bancroft mayor Lloyd Churchill in 2010 and continues to be known by both names. Millennium Park was created in 2000 and renamed as Shawashkong Millennium Park in 2026.

Viewing platform in Eagle's Nest Park (2021)

Vance Farm Park is located near the North Hastings Hospital, on Oak street, this 37 acre hilly site was donated to the town of Bancroft in 1998 and opened in 2001. It features hiking and walking trails.

Eagle's Nest Park scenic lookout is built on the top of a sheer rock face and overlooks the northern portions of the town, the York River and Bancroft Airport. It features the Hawkwatch Trail, capped by a large wooden platform that provides views out over the town. The trail passes the footings of a former 100-foot fire watchtower, from 1938.

=== Nearby parks ===
==== Silent Lake Provincial Park ====
Nearby south on Highway 28 provides local camping opportunities. American sportsmen fished and hunted on this private lake for 40 years before it became a park.

Silent Lake has a rocky and undeveloped shoreline, a mixed forest and marshes full of birds and wildlife best seen by canoe. A rugged trail circles the lake, and sections of groomed ski trails have been graded for mountain biking.

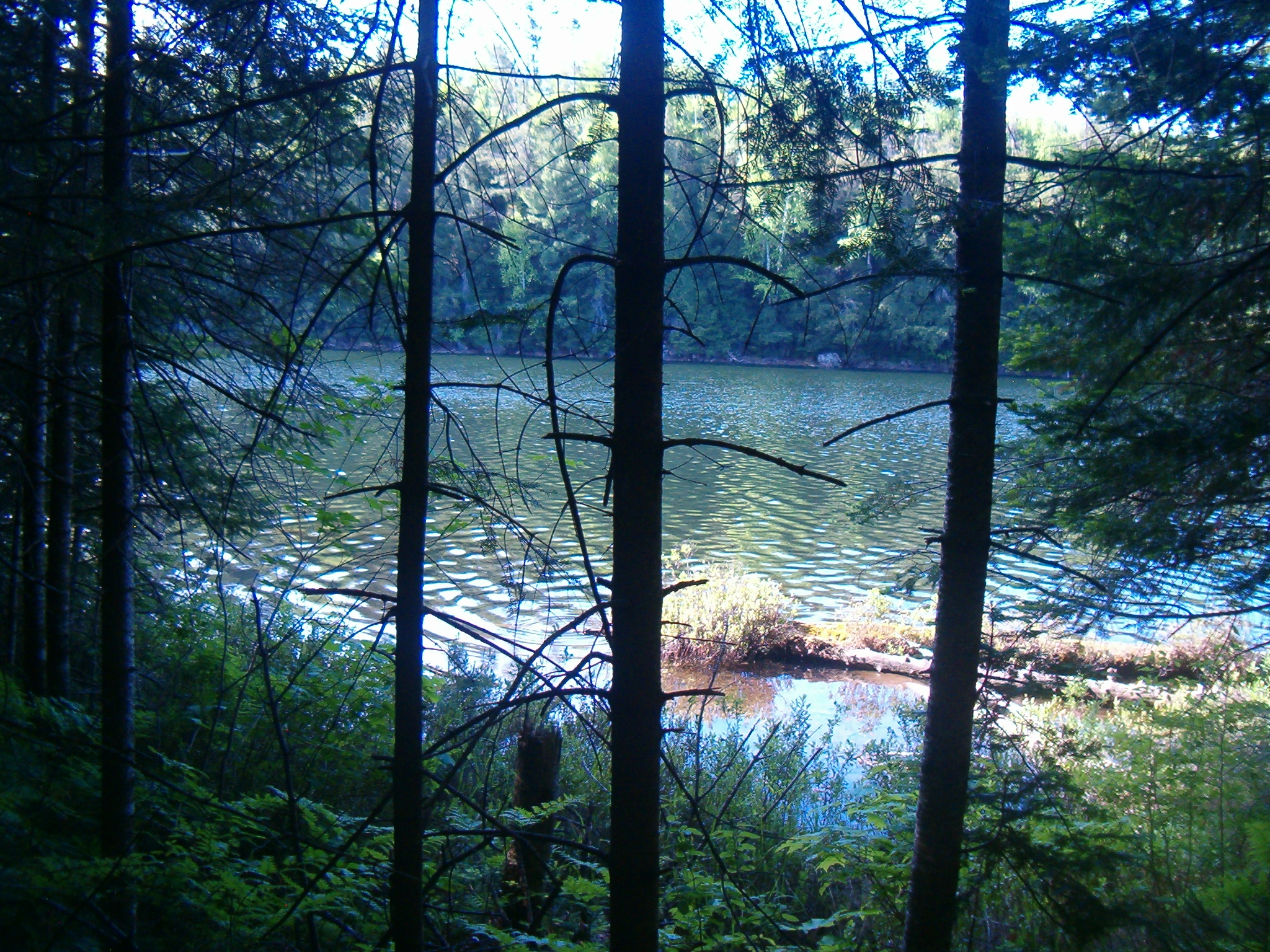
Algonquin Provincial Park

==== Algonquin Provincial Park ====
About an hour away on Highway 62 N - Highway 127 N - Highway 60 W, provides camping and hiking opportunities, beautiful forest and outdoor scenery. Portaging is quite common in this park. Algonquin Park includes many visitor attractions.

Like Silent Lake Park, Algonquin Oark has a rocky, treed and extensive undeveloped shoreline, a mixed forest and marshes full of birds and wildlife best seen by canoe. The Ontario Federation of Snowmobile Clubs trails through the park provide easy winter access by snowmobile. Common wildlife sightings include Moose, Black Bear, Whitetail Deer, and Beaver.

==== Egan Chutes Provincial Park ====
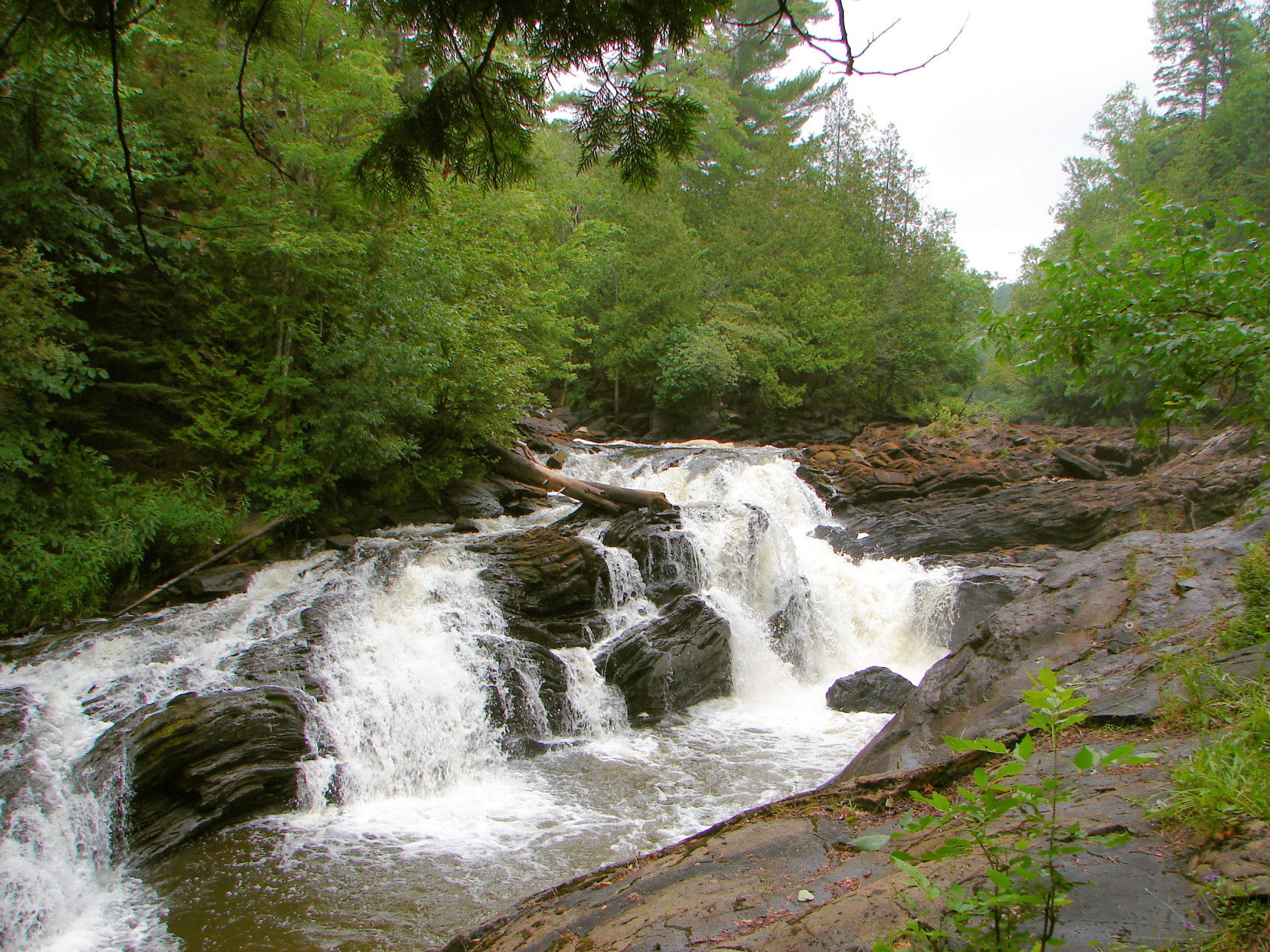
Egan Chutes Park

Located 15 km east of Bancroft on Highway 28. Egan Chutes Provincial Park is a nature reserve.

The park is home to many local plants including Poplar, White Birch, Ash, Buffalo Berry, and Purple Flowering Raspberry. Minerals found in the park include Nepheline, Blue Corundum, Zircon, Biotite, and Sodalite.

== Government and politics ==
=== Administration ===
Municipal offices, 2021

Bancroft is a lower tier municipality in Hastings County and its mayor serves as one of the fourteen members of Hastings County Council. It is described by Hastings County as the largest town in the county.

The municipal offices are located at 7 Hastings Heritage Way.

=== Political leadership from 1904 to 1999 ===
Jack Hattin, Reeve of Bancroft, c. 1980

Between 1904 and 1999, the town's government was led by Reeves (sometimes described as "mayors"). Reeves have includes John S. Hattin (between 1977, 1978, 1984, 1986, 1987, 1983, 1985, 1988); Russell Hawley (in 1976, 1979, 1980, 1981, 1982); Lloyd Churchill (from 1986 until 2002); and Charles Mullett (in 2003 to 2006).

Dungannon Township, which amalgamated into Bancroft in 1999. Prior to amalgamation, Dungannon Township had Reeves including Calvin White (in 1976, 1978, 1979, 1980, 1982, 1984, 1985, 1986, 1987, 1988, 1992, 1993, 1994, 1995, 1996, 1997); and Martin West (in 1989, 1990, 1991).

=== Political leadership since 1999 ===
After the 1999 amalgamation, Lloyd Churchill was the Town of Bancroft's first mayor.

Catherine Bernice Jenkins, commonly known as Bernice Jenkins, was Bancroft's second mayor, and first female mayor. Bernice Jenkins beat the sole opposition candidate, then Deputy Mayor, Larry McTaggart in the 2010 Hastings County municipal elections. Bernice Jenkins won 56.44% of the vote, beating sole opposition candidate Scott Munro in the 2014 Hastings County municipal elections. Bernice Jenkins resigned in September 2017 on health grounds, with municipal councillor Paul Jenkins then assuming the role.

Paul Jenkins was appointed as Acting Mayor in December 2017 and held that role until the 2018 municipal election. During the 2018 Hastings County municipal elections, Paul Jenkins won 59.63% of the vote against fellow municipal councillor Mary Kavanagh. In the 2022 Hastings County municipal elections, Paul Jenkins won 47% of the vote, beating Scott Munro and Michael Anderson. His term runs until 14 November 2026. In May 2026, Paul Jenkins confirmed that he would not seek a third term in the 2026 Ontario municipal elections, but may run as a municipal councillor.

On 1 May, 2025, the Mayor of Bancroft was given Strong Mayor Powers.

In the 2026 Ontario municipal elections, Bancroft municipal councillor Tracy McGibbon won the mayoral election with 862 votes (42%) , beating rivals Mark Pharand (802 votes, 39%), Brad Sinclair (361 votes), and Joshua MacDonald (42 votes).

== Transportation ==
Bancroft lies at the intersection of two provincial highways, Highway 28 and Highway 62, with several other inroads allowing access to the city. 2.4 million vehicles pass through the town on Highway 28 per year. Since 2001, the nonprofit organization Bancroft Community Transit provides public transit services by cars and minivans.

Bancroft is served by the Bancroft Airport, a Transport Canada Registered Aerodrome (CNW3), with a 2,200-foot (670 m) crushed gravel runway, located immediately adjoining the town. A small airport, it was named after the man who was reeve at the time and instrumental in its construction. Currently operated by the Bancroft Flying Club, the Jack Brown Airport is freely available to the general public and frequently referred to as The Bancroft Airport. Due to high terrain near both ends of the runway, pilots typically use a non-standard circuit, following the York River valley through the town for departing from runway 12 or landing on runway 30.

== Education ==
Bancroft is served by Hastings & Prince Edward District School Board that operates North Hastings High School and York River Public School.

Algonquin and Lakeshore Catholic District School Board operates Our Lady of Mercy Catholic School. Loyalist College has a campus in Bancroft.

== Public Health ==
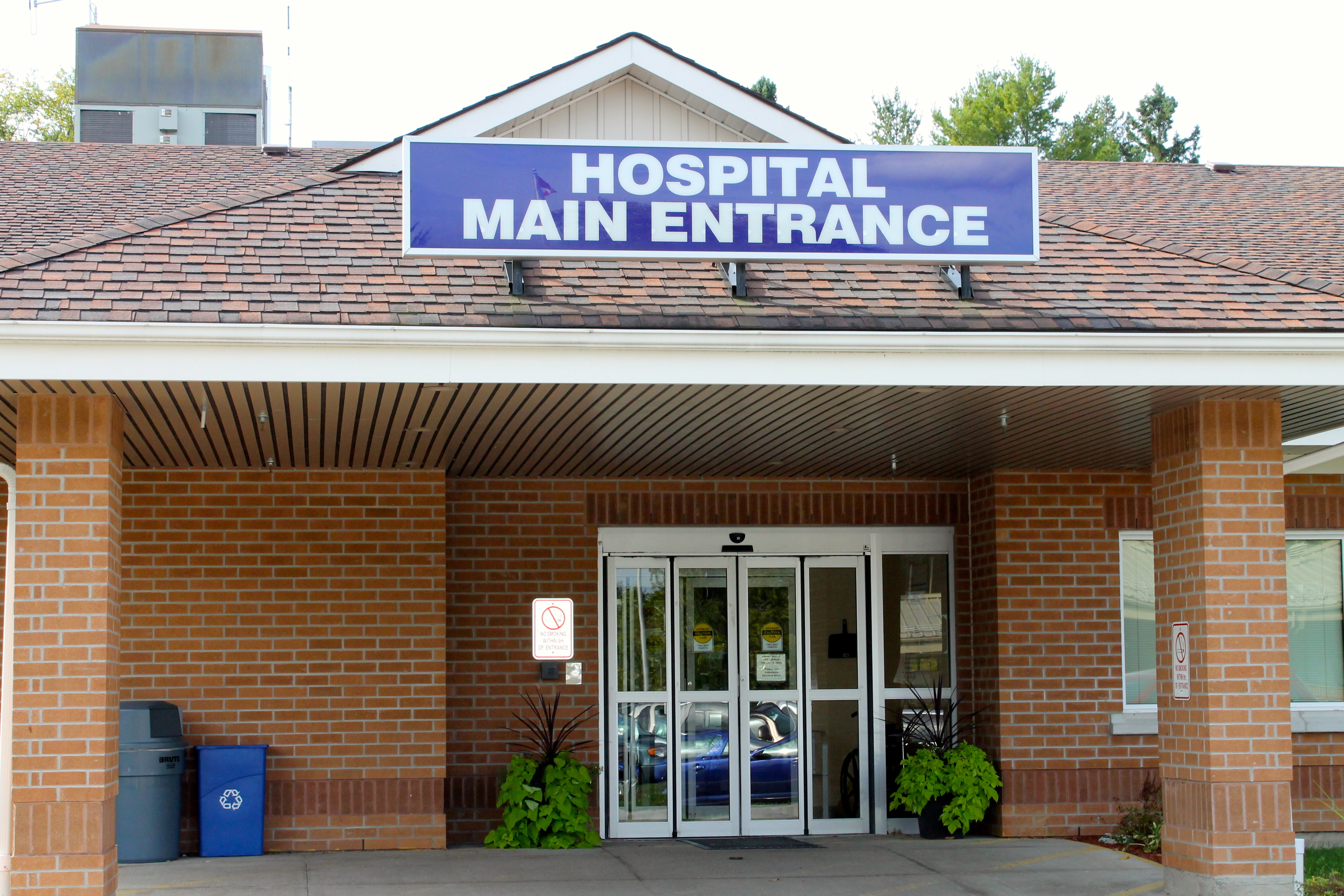
North Hastings Hospital

Quinte Health operates the North Hastings Hospital located at 1-H Manor Lane, Bancroft. The hospital has eight primary care beds, a 24/7 emergency department, emergency obstetrics, diagnostic imaging and telemedicine services.

== Crime and social services ==
Violent crime in Bancroft dropped 22.4 from 2014 to 2015. Crime rates in Bancroft in 2020 were 20% below the national average. Violent crime was 17% below the national average. The crime rate dropped again from 2021 to 2025.

The Bancroft Lion's club was founded in 1945.

== Media ==
=== News and print media ===
- The Bancroft Times, weekly newspaper, founded 1894.
- Bancroft This Week, weekly newspaper
- MyBancroftNow website operated by MooseFM publishes daily news
- The Mastodon, a quarterly paper covering topics of local natural history

=== Radio ===
Frequency	Call sign	Branding	Format	Owner	Notes
FM 97.7	CHMS-FM	Moose FM	hot adult contemporary	Vista Broadcast Group	Formerly CJNH 1240 AM
FM 99.3	CBLA-FM-5	CBC Radio One	Talk radio, public radio	Canadian Broadcasting Corporation	Formerly CBLV 600 AM; Rebroadcaster of CBLA-FM Toronto
FM 103.5	CKJJ-FM-4	UCB Canada	Christian Music	UCB Canada	Rebroadcaster of CKJJ-FM Belleville

=== Television ===
OTA channel	Call sign	Network	Notes
2	CIII-TV-2	Global	Analogue rebroadcaster of CIII-DT Toronto
4	CHEX-TV-1	Global	Analogue rebroadcaster of CHEX-DT Peterborough

== Notable residents ==
=== Historical residents ===
- Bruce Beyer (1948 – 2019) U.S. Vietnam War draft dodger, lived in Bancroft 1972 – 1977
- Billa Flint (1805 – 1894) politician, businessman, owned mills in Bancroft, renamed the town from York River
- D. G. Jones (1929 – 2016), poet was born in Bancroft
- Henry Maloney (1915 – 1987), Catholic priest, in Bancroft from 1957
- David Milne (1882 – 1953) lived on Baptiste Lake, died in Bancroft.
- Clarke Rollins (1912 – 1996) politician, lived in Bancroft
- Arne Roosman (1932 – 2006), artist, lived in Bancroft
- Arthur H. Shore (born 1893) uranium mine owner, worked in Bancroft from the 1940s
- Bryan Watson (1942 – 2021) NHL defenseman, born in Bancroft

=== Living people ===
- Clay Ives (born 1972), Olympic bronze medalist in luge was born and lives in Bancroft
- Mary Milne, artist was born in Bancroft
- Ed Robertson (born 1970) singer and songwriter for Barenaked Ladies, owns a cottage in the Bancroft area
- Cathy Sherk (born 1950) golfer, winner of the 1977 Canadian Women's Amateur and 1978 U.S. Women's Amateur, born in Bancroft
- Julie White (born 1960) high jumper, born in Bancroft

== See also ==
- List of communities in Ontario
- List of townships in Ontario
- Uranium mining in the Bancroft area
