= Eagle's Nest Park =

Scenic viewpoint in Ontario, Canada

Coordinates: 45°04′24″N 77°51′17″W

Eagles Nest Park
- Interactive map of Eagles Nest Park
- Type: Public
- Location: Bancroft, Ontario
- Owner: Town of Bancroft
- Operator: Stewards of Eagles Nest Park
- Website: https://eaglesnestpark.com/

Eagle's Nest Park is a scenic lookout in the town of Bancroft, Ontario, Canada. It is built on the top of a sheer rock face and overlooks the northern portions of the town, the York River and Bancroft Airport.

== Nomenclature ==
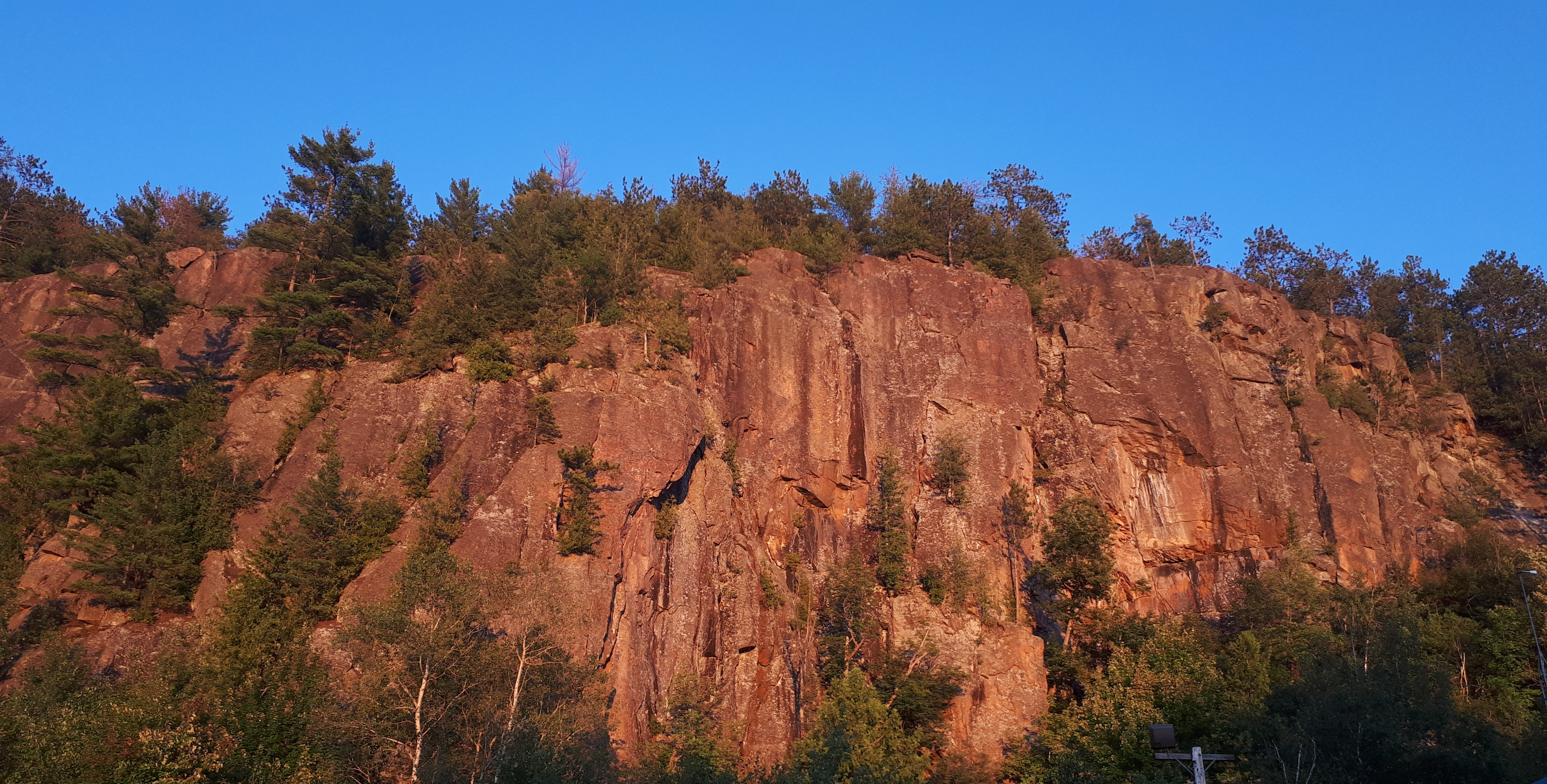
The sheer rock of Eagle's Nest Park facing Hastings St.

The name comes from a likely apocryphal story that takes place in 1883. Mr. and Mrs. Gaebel were in their yard when they heard the screams of a child that an eagle was attempting to carry off. The eagle was frightened off and the child unharmed, but the Gaebel's decided they should remove the eagle to prevent such attacks in the future. They lowered their son, 12-year-old William, down to the nest that was in a fir tree on the cliff face. He destroyed the eggs and the eagle left, never to return. Eagles were reported to have used the site in the past, but the last recorded confirmed sighting in the area was in 1918.

== Administration ==
The Park is owned by the Town of Bancroft and managed by the not-for-profit organization Stewards of Eagles Nest Park.

== Features ==
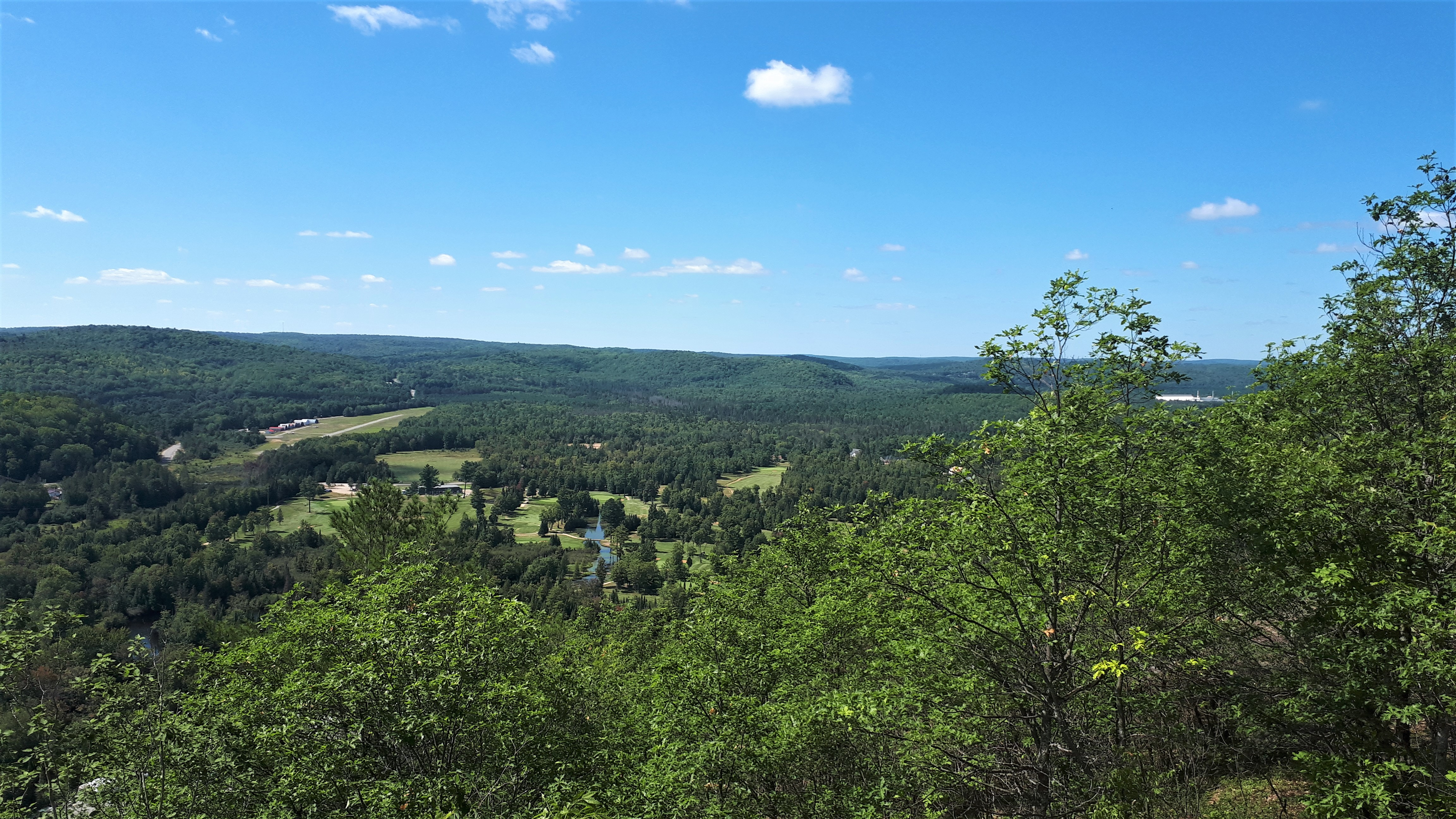
View of Bancroft from Eagle's Nest Park

The park includes the Hawkwatch Trail, capped by a large wooden platform that provides views out over the town. The trail passes the footings of a former fire watchtower, constructed in 1938. The site was redeveloped by Hastings Destination Trails Inc with several additional trails being added and a number of interpretive centers.

== See also ==
- Parks in Bancroft
