= Quinte Health =

Canadian hospital organization

- Abbreviation: QH
- Predecessor: Quinte Healthcare Corporation
- Founded: 1998
- Purpose: Public Hospital
- Headquarters: 265 Dundas Street East, Belleville, Ontario
- President and CEO: Stacey Daub
- Chief of Staff: Dr. Colin MacPherson
- Board chair: Gary Hannaford
- Parent organization: Ministry of Health
- Website: https://quintehealth.ca/
- Formerly called: Quinte Healthcare Corporation

Quinte Health is a hospital corporation that operates four hospitals in Ontario, Canada. The four hospitals are; Belleville General Hospital, Trenton Memorial Hospital, Prince Edward County Memorial Hospital and North Hastings Hospital.

== Governance ==
Quinte Health is part of the Ontario Public Hospitals Act. As per the act, the corporation is governed by a board of directors who are responsible to the Ministry of Health.

== History ==
The corporation was formed in 1998. In November of the same year; Belleville General Hospital, Trenton Memorial Hospital, Prince Edward County Memorial Hospital, and North Hastings Hospital were amalgamated into Quinte Healthcare Corporation.

Amid rising debt, the Ontario Ministry of Health took over Quinte Health Corporation in 2009. That same year a supervisor was appointed by the Ministry of Health to ensure recommendations were implemented and criteria were met.

Quinte Health was originally named Quinte Healthcare Corporation; the name was changed in 2022.

In 2022, nine nurses were terminated for failure to comply with the COVID-19 mandatory vaccination policy. In 2024, an arbitrator ruled that the nine nurses were to be reinstated. The arbitrator, James Hayes, said "...They should have been offered the option of an unpaid leave of absence and must, therefore, be reinstated as Quinte employees if that be their wish."

== Hospitals ==
=== Belleville General Hospital ===
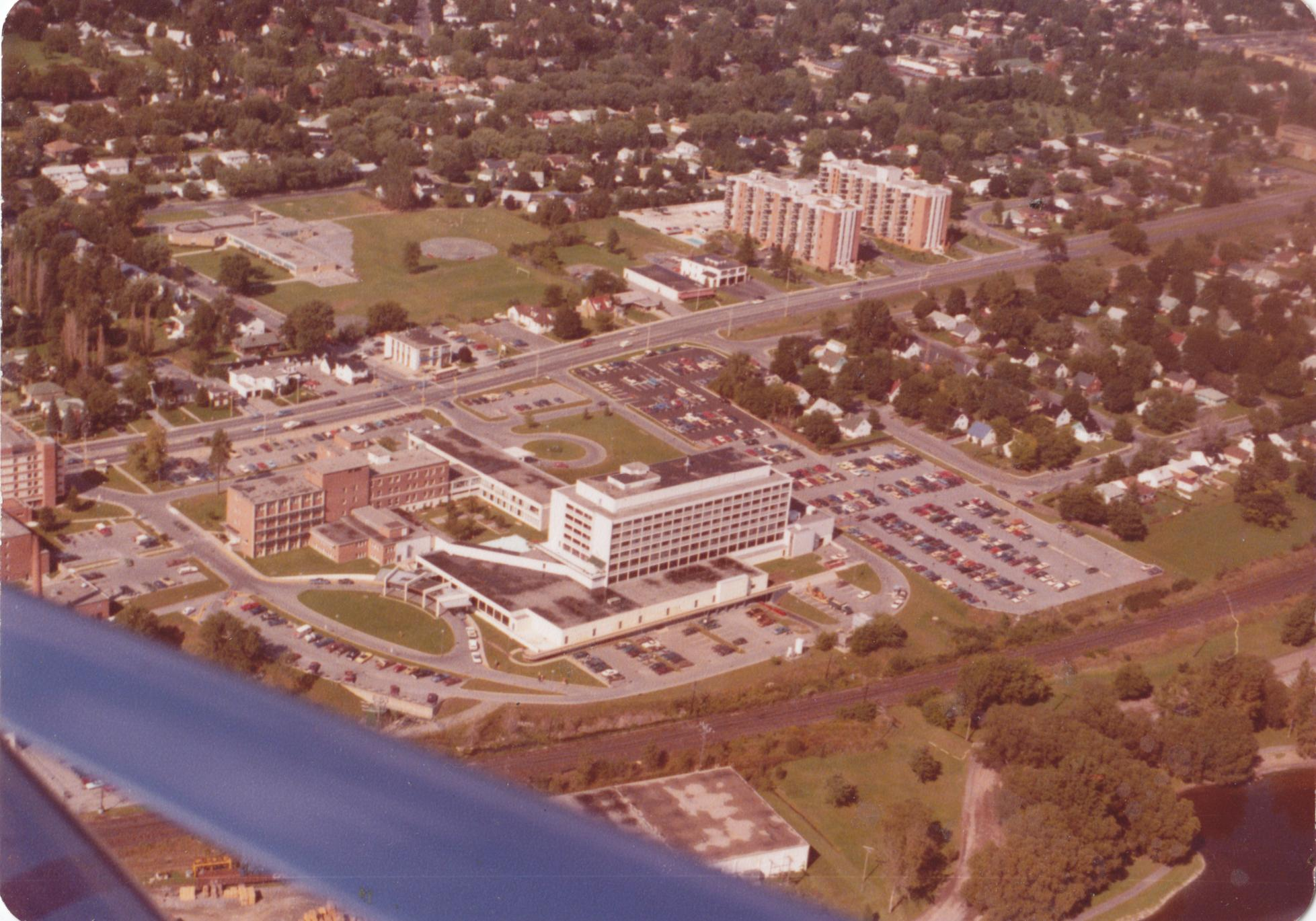
Belleville hospital

Belleville General Hospital is the largest of the four hospitals. It is located at 265 Dundas Street East, Belleville, Ontario and is equipped with 192 beds.

The hospital was founded in 1866 by the Women's Christian Association under the name "The Belleville Hospital and Home for the Friendless". Alongside, the "Belleville Hospital and Home for the Friendless" a School of Nursing was established named the "Belleville General Hospital School of Nursing". By 1948, the Women's Christian Association had deemed the hospital and School of Nursing too expensive and complicated. The hospital was donated to it the City of Belleville. Upon the amalgamation of modern-day Belleville General Hospital, Trenton Memorial Hospital, Prince Edward County Memorial Hospital and North Hastings Hospital; the name was changed to "Quinte Health Care Belleville General".

=== Trenton Memorial Hospital ===
Trenton Memorial Hospital is located at 242 King Street, Trenton, Ontario. Trenton Memorial Hospital houses 26 inpatient beds.

In 1951, the hospital was opened with the support of the local branches of the Lions Clubs International and Rotary International. The name "Trenton Memorial Hospital" was chosen to commemorate the fallen soldiers. To expansions happened in 1961 and 1969. Trenton Memorial Hospital underwent a major redevelopment, completed in 2006, which doubled the size of the hospital. Upon the amalgamation of modern-day Belleville General Hospital, Trenton Memorial Hospital, Prince Edward County Memorial Hospital and North Hastings Hospital; the name was changed to "Quinte Health Care Trenton Memorial".

=== Prince Edward County Memorial Hospital ===
Prince Edward County Memorial Hospital address is 403 Picton Main Street, Prince Edward, Ontario. PECMH has 18 inpatient beds.

The hospital was opened on April 17, 1919, under the name "Prince Edward County Hospital". It was partially funded by Sir Thomas Picton Chapter, Imperial Order Daughters of the Empire. PECMH was started with 9 non-inpatient beds and soon grew to 58 non-inpatient beds. On October 14, 1959, it was moved to its current location under the name “Prince Edward County Memorial Hospital”. Upon the amalgamation of modern-day Belleville General Hospital, Trenton Memorial Hospital, Prince Edward County Memorial Hospital and North Hastings Hospital; the name was changed to "Quinte Health Care Prince Edward County Memorial".

As of 2024, a new facility is being built in Picton projected to be completed by 2027. The contract was awarded to M. Sullivan & Son Limited by Infrastructure Ontario and Quinte Health. The new PECMH is being promoted as a "Sustainable Future".

=== North Hastings Hospital ===
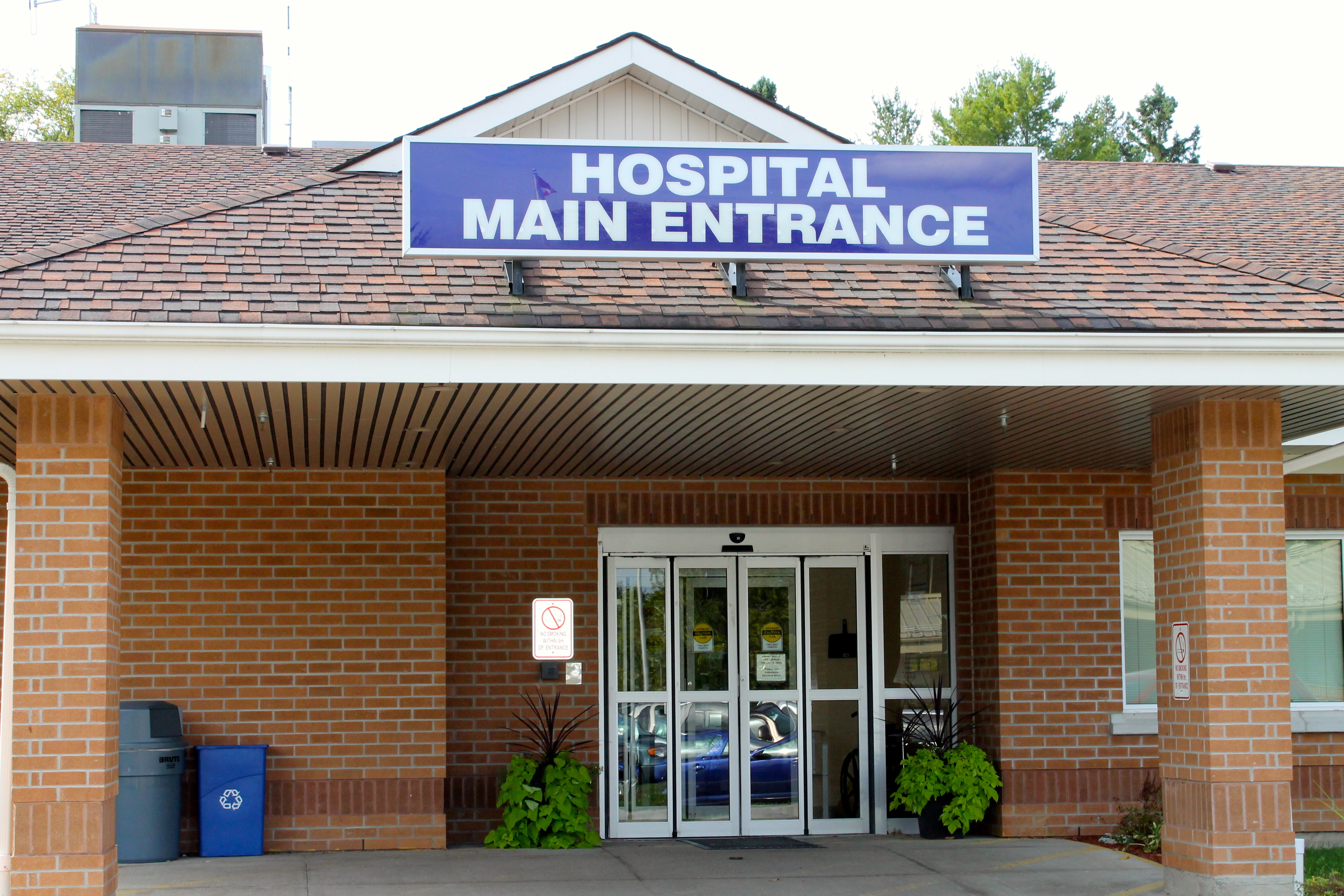
North Hastings Hospital

North Hastings Hospital is located at 1-H Manor Lane, Bancroft, Ontario. North Hastings Hospital includes eight primary care beds, a 24/7 emergency department, emergency obstetrics, diagnostic imaging and telemedicine services.

The local hospital started out as a health post in 1927 primarily for treating injuries from local mining. The next hospital was built in 1949 under the name "Red Cross Hospital" supported by the Red Cross. In 1983, it was merged with Belleville General Hospital and was named "North Hastings District Hospital".

An expansion happened in 1985 adding a radiology room, three more stretcher bays, health records and a administrative space. Upon the amalgamation of modern-day Belleville General Hospital, Trenton Memorial Hospital, Prince Edward County Memorial Hospital and North Hastings Hospital; the name was changed to "Quinte Health Care North Hastings". In April 2002, the new building at 1-H Manor Lane was opened; the building is shared with the Hastings Centennial Manor.

== Awards ==
- Provincial Eligible Approach Rate Award from Ontario Health (Trillium Gift of Life Network)
- Accreditation Canada's Stroke Distinction
- Accreditation with Exemplary Standing by Accreditation Canada
