= Arne Roosman =

Estonian-Canadian artist (1932–2026)

- Born: 6 March 1932; Tallinn, Estonia
- Died: 15 January 2026 (aged 93); Bancroft, Ontario, Canada
- Notable work: Myth (oil painting); Secret of Family (oil painting); Tartu College mural

Arne Roosman (6 March 1932 – 15 January 2026) was an Estonian-Canadian painter, lithographer and muralist. After fleeing the Soviet occupation of Estonia and Nazi Germany, Roosman lived in Sweden and Canada.

Two of his oil paintings are included in the digital collection of the Art Museum of Estonia. His life is the feature of the Nate Smelle's 2025 memoir 'Twas a Sunny Day.

== Early life and education ==
Arne Roosman was born on 6 March 1932 in Tallinn, Estonia. Arne was the middle brother of three, the older Gösta and younger Benny and was born to mother Helle and father Axel Roosman. Axel Roosman was a painter and a lithographer who worked for the Government of Estonia, where he designed postage stamps and money.

In 1941, the Roosman family moved to Schwerin, Germany, fleeing Soviet occupation. Axel Roosman avoided military conscription and was sent to Northern Italy to manage a Nazi-run factory that made barricades.

== Adult life and early career ==
In 1948, the Roosman family moved to Sweden. After being rejected by the United States, Arne Roosman immigrated to Canada in 1957, when he was 25 years old.

Roosman worked for Reid Press in Hamilton, Ontario. In Hamilton, he met his wife, Lena, who had also immigrated from Estonia. The couple moved to Toronto. In 1988, after Roosman's retirement, they moved to Bancroft, Ontario. The couple have two daughters, Anne and Rebecca Roosman-Mackay.

== Artistic career ==
Roosman's father trained him in design, but he had no formal training in art. He used oil paints, charcoal and pastels in his landscapes, portraits, and illustrations. His artistic style incorporates cubism.

In 2010, his exhibition "Legends and Landscapes" was shown in the Art Gallery of Bancroft. Roosman has worked as the gallery's curator and director. His "Legends and Landscapes" exhibit was later developed into a book. In 2013, he designed the set for Blackfly Theater's production of Noises Off. In 2014, his exhibit "Here & Now/There & Then" was shown in the Art Gallery of Bancroft. In 2014, his 44-foot long mural depicting the history of York River, including the arrival of settlers, was installed in Bridge Street West, Bancroft. The mural was updated in 2025, with Roosman's approval. In 2016, Roosman contributed a 50-foot mural to the Bloor Street revitalization project. The mural was attached to Tartu College.

Roosman's 2003 oil painting Myth (based on the epic Kalevipoeg) and his 2008 oil painting Secret of Family are in the Art Museum of Estonia's digital collection.

== Death and legacy ==
Roosman died in Bancroft, Ontario on 15 January 2026, at the age of 93.

He is the subject of Nate Smelle's 2025 memoir 'Twas a Sunny Day. The book includes poetry and art by Roosman and was launched at the Canadian Peace Museum.
