= Umfraville, Ontario =

Ontario Ghost Town

Umfraville, Ontario Kavanagh Settlement
- Ghost Town
- Interactive map of Umfraville, Ontario
- Location in Southern Ontario
- Coordinates: 44°59′08″N 77°48′17″W
- Country: Canada
- Province: Ontario
- County: Hastings
- Founder: Kavanagh Family

Umfraville is a ghost town in Ontario, Canada. It was located in the former Dunagonnon Township of what is now Bancroft on Egan Creek and was settled by the Dermont and Patrick ("Darby") Kavanagh.

== Nomenclature ==
Umfraville was first known as Kavanagh Settlement, before being changed to Umphraville, and then to Umfraville in 1874.

== History ==
Patrick ("Darby") Kavanagh built the Umphraville Post Office on the Old Hastings Road, later expanding his business interest to include a cattle-dealing, a store and a hotel. His brother Dermont Kavanagh was the first postmaster and held the role from 1 October 1864 until 2 October 1899. Dermont Kavanagh later became a popular politician and businessman. In 1879 he was elected as the Reeve of Dungannon and Faraday and was appointed at the warden of Hastings County in 1896.

Umfraville's school was built in 1870. In 1875, Umfraville had 250 residents, a school, four churches, the post office and a both a flour mill and a saw mill constructed by William Jorman.

The settlement's cemetery was started in 1907.

As of 2012, all that remains of the ghost is cemetery known as the Pioneer Cemetery of Umfraville.
