= Cenotaph Park =

Park in Ontario, Canada

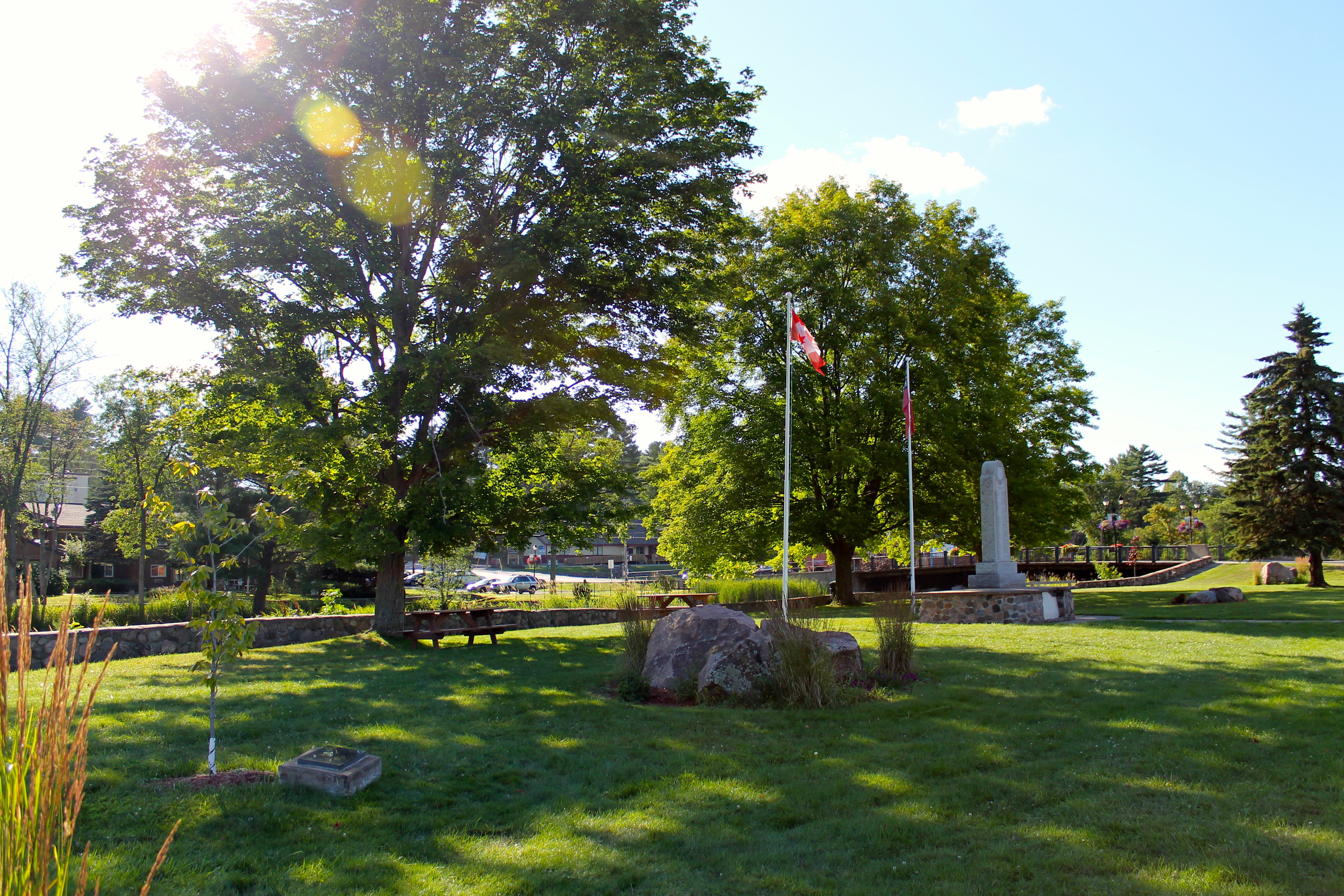

- Location within Southern Ontario
- Type: Public park
- Location: Bancroft, Ontario, Canada
- Coordinates: 45.0592788°N 77.8572571°W
- Operator: Town of Bancroft
- Status: Open year-round

Cenotaph Park is a park in Bancroft, Ontario, Canada, on the corner of Station and River streets. The park includes a cenotaph, the Dutch–Canadian Friendship Tulip Garden, and a peace pole.

The cenotaph was constructed in 1956 by the Royal Canadian Legion Branch 181 to commemorates military personnel killed in the First World War, the Second World War and the Korean War. The current cenotaph incorporates a marble plaque from a previous cenotaph that was erected by the Girls Club of the Allies.

The Dutch–Canadian Friendship Tulip Garden was planted in 2015 by the Bancroft Horticultural Society. The peace pole was unveiled in 2024.

== See also ==
- Parks in Bancroft
- Canada–Netherlands relations
