= CHMS-FM =

Radio station in Bancroft, Ontario

Coordinates: 45°04′12″N 77°58′14″W

- Bancroft, Ontario; Canada
- Frequency: 97.7 MHz
- Branding: 97.7 Moose FM

Programming
- Format: Classic hits

Ownership
- Owner: Vista Broadcast Group

History
- First air date: 1975
- Former call signs: CJNH (1975–2001)
- Former frequencies: 1240 kHz (1975–2001)
- Call sign meaning: MS for "Moose"

Technical information
- Class: C1
- ERP: 50 kWs; Horizontal Polarization Only
- HAAT: 174.4 metres (572 ft)

Links
- Website: mybancroftnow.com

CHMS-FM is a Canadian radio station broadcasting at 97.7 FM in Bancroft, Ontario. The station airs a classic Hits format using the on-air branding 97.7 Moose FM, and is owned by Vista Broadcast Group.

The station originally began broadcasting as CJNH in 1975, on the AM band at 1240 kHz and partially rebroadcasting CJBQ in Belleville, and CJTN in Trenton, to the south.

On December 13, 1984, the Canadian Radio-television and Telecommunications Commission (CRTC) approved a number of applications for a number of AM radio stations across Ontario including CJNH Bancroft to increase their nighttime power from 250 watts to 1,000 watts.

CJNH was given approval by the CRTC on March 2, 2001 to convert to FM, and moved to the FM band at 97.7 FM in May 2001 with the new callsign CHMS-FM.

On April 23, 2012 Vista Broadcast Group, which owns a number of radio stations in western Canada, announced a deal to acquire Haliburton Broadcasting Group, in cooperation with Westerkirk Capital. The transaction was approved by the CRTC on October 19, 2012.

The station later became a classic hits and variety as 97.7 Moose FM.

In 2022, the station won the Ontario Association of Broadcasters' Community Service Award for their We’re All Heart Radiothon.
