= Simor Hospital =

Hospital in Hungary

Coordinates: 47°48′5″N 18°44′33.5″E

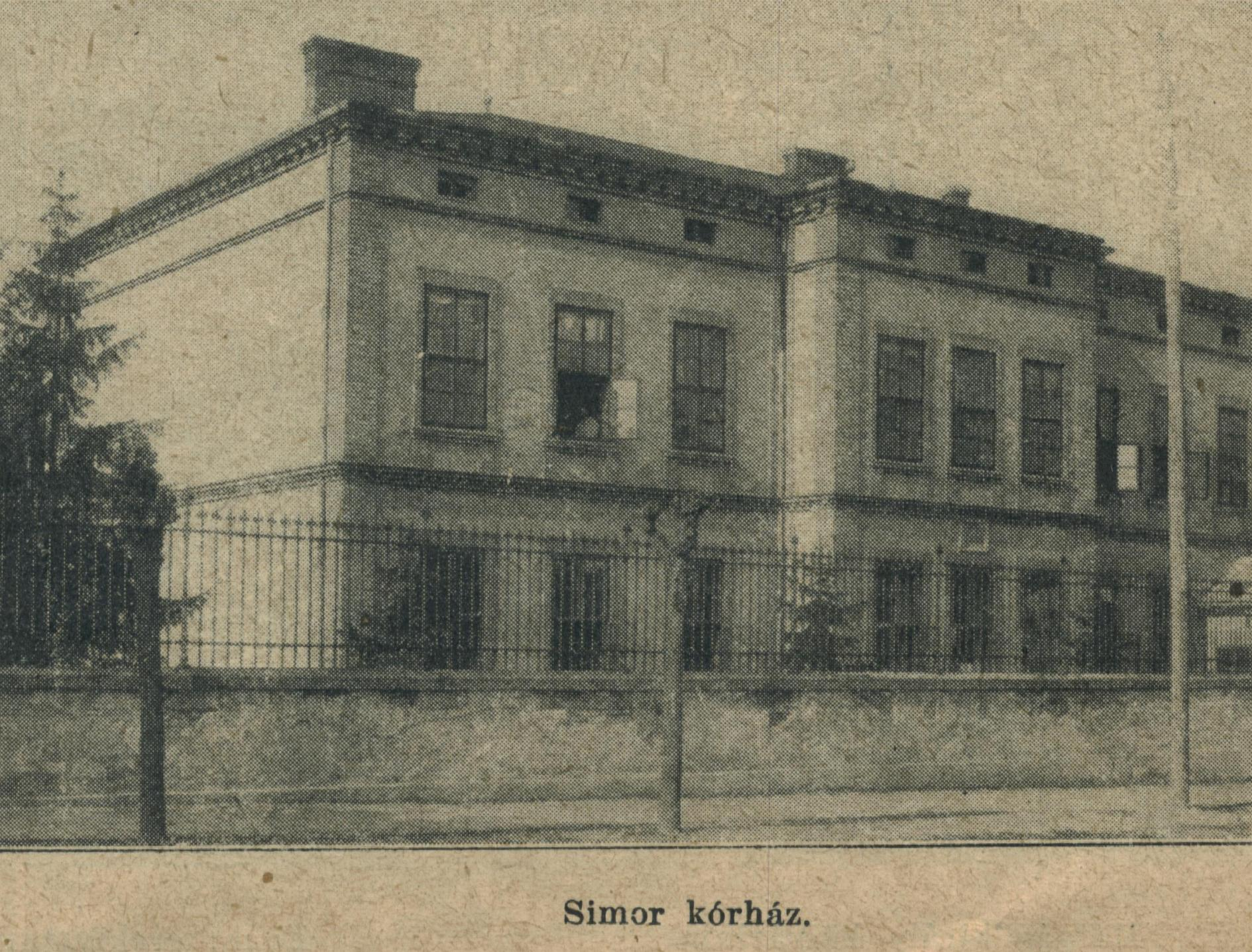
The main building in the past

The now defunct Simor Hospital in Esztergom, Hungary, also known as the Red Cross Hospital or Archbishop's Hospital, was founded in 1885 by Archbishop János Simor in the then-separate town of Szentgyörgymező, at the part of the settlement with the cleanest air. For a long time, it operated as the Vaszary Kolos Hospital Psychiatric Rehabilitation Department.

== History ==
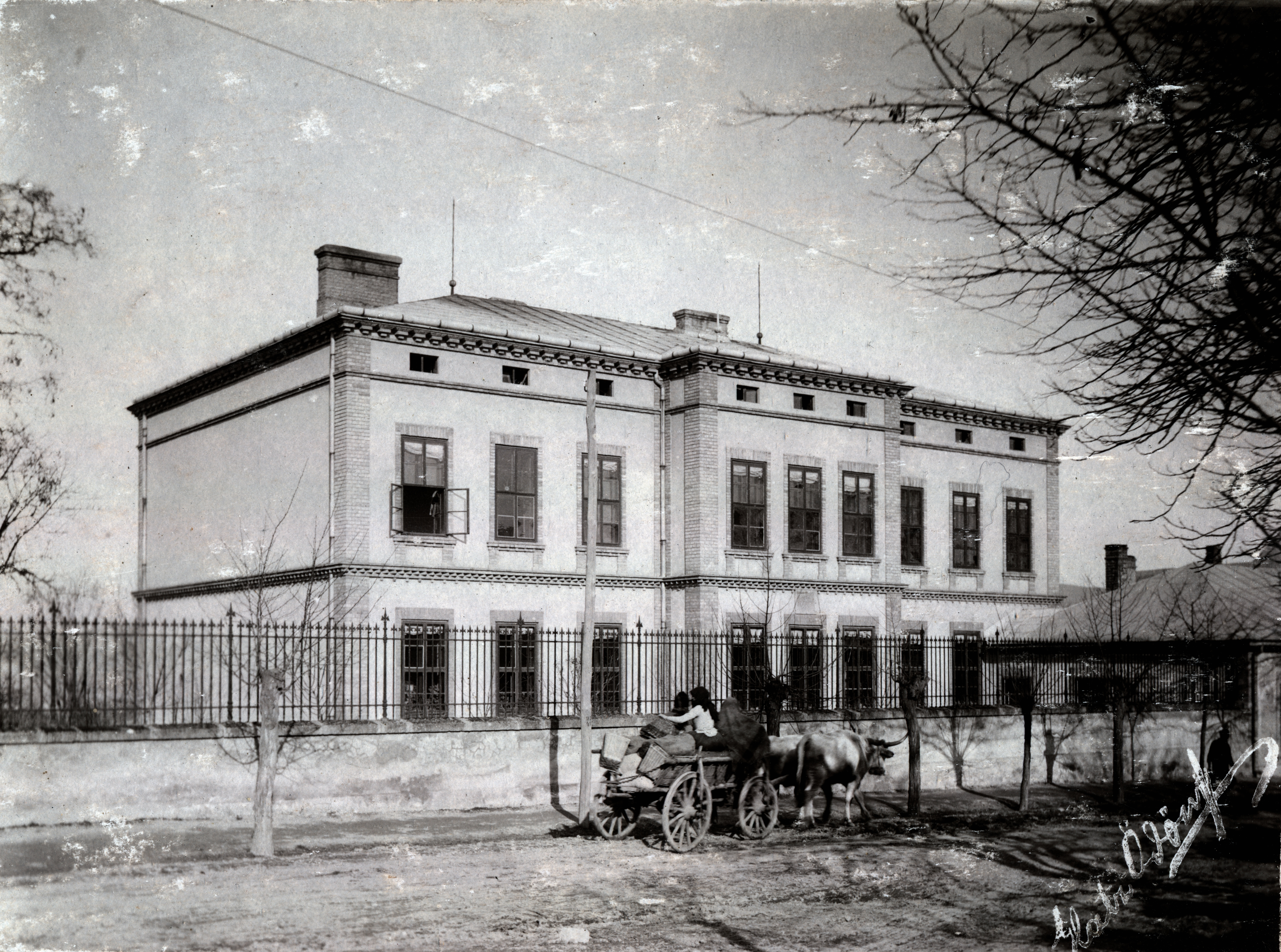
The Red Cross Hospital in 1900

In the 1880s, Cardinal Simor decided to found a hospital. His vision was that it would primarily serve in times of war, accommodating fifty soldiers at the expense of the church. In peacetime, ten beds were reserved for poor citizens. Simor purchased the hospital's plot, which already had a building on it, for 10,000 forints. The contract was signed on January 6, 1881, with Mayor Károly Palkovics. He had the seven-room building renovated for the nuns, and built the two-story main building next to it, connecting them with a corridor. The contractor was Ignác Feigler from Pozsony (now Bratislava, Slovakia), whose 26,024-forint budget was approved by the archbishop. The hospital began operating on September 6, 1885, on Úri Street (now Dobozi Mihály Street). The chief physician was Imre Rapcsák, who had gained his medical experience as an assistant doctor in Vienna. Nursing was performed by nuns of the Sisters of Charity of Szatmár. This also became the hospital of the Hungarian Red Cross. During World War I, it functioned as a military hospital.

Due to the insufficient capacity of the Kolos Hospital, the idea of merging the two hospitals was already raised in the early 20th century, but the war delayed this plan. In 1915, Archduke Charles and his wife Princess Zita visited the Red Cross Hospital while staying in Esztergom as guests of Archbishop János Csernoch. Although the facility was designed for 100 people, 170 wounded soldiers were treated there at the time. From the day of mobilization until the day of the visit, 760 patients had been admitted and 120 operations performed.

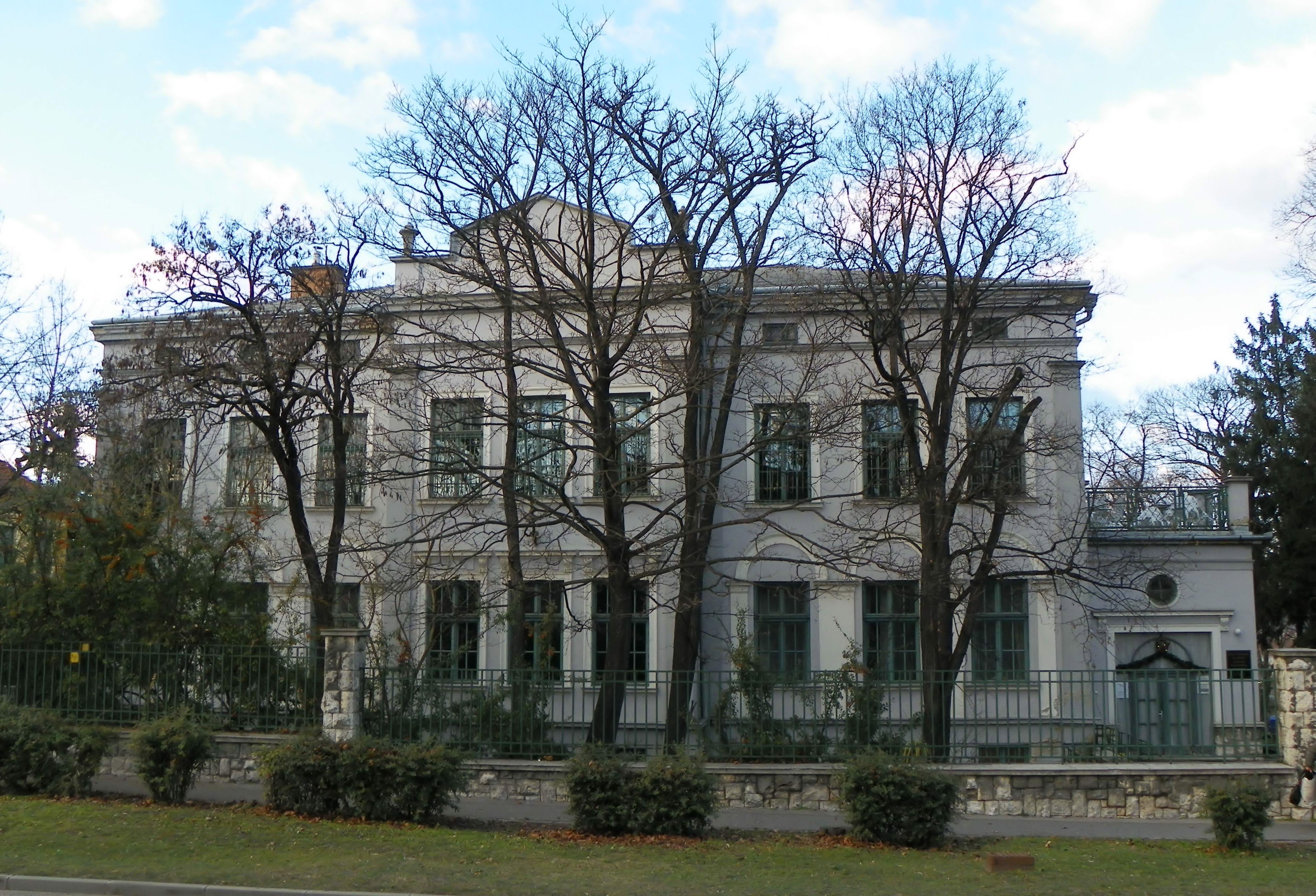
The hospital in 2010

In 1916, a new modern wing was added to the old building, funded by a donation from Csernoch. Before the war, the archdiocese owned a vast territory, but could not maintain the hospital afterward, leading to the merger of the two institutions on December 6, 1919. This was the only possible way to expand the Kolos Hospital. In the 1920s, Kolos Hospital had 120 beds and Simor Hospital had 80. Later, due to the area's good air quality, it was used for treating tuberculosis patients. In November 1938, the two hospitals separated again. In 1950, the institution was nationalized. Under Dr. László Szigethy, it operated as a pulmonary department until 1968. On September 8, 1968, a new neuropsychiatric department was established here under the leadership of Lóránd Leel-Őssy. On July 17, 1985, with the opening of the new pavilion of Vaszary Hospital, Simor Hospital ceased providing inpatient care.

In April 2025 the 1086 m² building and its 8879 m² plot were listed on the Hungarian National Asset Management Inc.'s auction site with a starting price of nearly 400 million forints. The building is managed by Vaszary Kolos Hospital and owned by the Hungarian state. It was described as in need of renovation at the time.

== Description ==
The hospital had a capacity of fifty beds. At the entrance to the park stood the gatehouse, consisting of two rooms and a kitchen. Along the connecting corridor were the main kitchen, laundry, and servants' quarters. A large hall overlooking the garden served as a lounge for patients able to walk. A chapel operated on the ground floor. Both the ground and upper floors had five tall, spacious, well-ventilated wards, each with a bathroom, meeting the health standards of the era. Each bed had a chair, and every room was equipped with a table. Outpatient services were also provided in a renovated separate building.

== Sources ==
- Esztergom és Vidéke – Esztergom közegészségügye az elmúlt századokban (6. rész), 2001

== See also ==
- List of hospitals in Hungary
