= Tweed & Company Theatre =

Theatre

- Village Playhouse, Bancroft
- Founded: 2009
- Founder: Tim Porter
- Legal status: Charity
- Headquarters: Tweed, Ontario
- Location(s): Tweed, Ontario and Bancroft, Ontario
- Artistic Director: Tim Porter
- General Manager: Emily Mewett
- Website: https://www.tweedandcompany.com/

Tweed & Company Theatre is a Canadian charitable organization that operates the Marble Arts Centre and the Outdoor Stage in Tweed, Ontario and the Bancroft Village Playhouse in Bancroft, Ontario.

== History ==
1925 postcard of Bancroft Community Hall, the building that is now the Bancroft Village Playhouse theatre

Tim Porter founded the organization in 2009. Emily Mewett joined the organization as the General Manager in 2010.

In 2022, the organization purchased the Marble Arts Centre, a former church in Tweed, Ontario. The same year, the company signed lease on the 196-seat Bancroft Village Playhouse. In 2023, the organization launched the Outdoor Stage venue in Tweed Memorial Park. The Outdoor Stage incorporates seating and standing spaces for customers and a raised performance stage.

In 2024 the organization was the winning top performing arts attraction in the Ontario Choice Awards, a tourism award organized by Attractions Ontario.

== Activities and organization ==
Bancroft Village Playhouse participates in the Toronto International Film Festival, and screens films under the banner of TIFF Film Circuit Bancroft.

The organization had 20,000 patrons in 2024. The staff grew from seven in 2023 to nine in 2024 and include Tim Porter, the Artistic Director and Emily Mewett, the General Manager. The charity is governed by a nine-member board of directors.
