= Ontario Federation of Snowmobile Clubs =

Canadian non-profit organization

The Ontario Federation of Snowmobile Clubs is a volunteer-based, non-profit organization responsible for the majority of all groomed snowmobile trails in the province of Ontario, Canada.

Based in Barrie, Ontario, the OFSC represents 231 member snowmobile clubs who operate the world's largest recreational trail system—39,000 kilometres of snowmobile trails that link most snowbelt communities in Canada's largest province. Ontario law requires that recreational and touring sledders purchase a Snowmobile Trail Permit from the OFSC to access or ride OFSC trails during the winter.
