= Bancroft Airport =

Coordinates: 45°04′23″N 77°52′50″W

- IATA: none; ICAO: none

Summary
- Airport type: Public
- Owner/Operator: Bancroft Flying Club
- Serves: North Hastings
- Location: 522 Chemaushgon Road, Bancroft, Ontario, Canada
- Opened: 1963-1983, 1985-Present
- Focus city for: Bancroft, Ontario
- Built: 1963
- Time zone: EST (UTC−05:00)
  - Summer (DST): EDT (UTC−04:00)
- Elevation AMSL: 1,085 ft (331 m)
- Website: bancroftflyingclub.ca
- Interactive map of Bancroft Airport

Runways
| Direction | Length | | Surface |
| Direction | ft | m | Surface |
|---|---|---|---|
| 12/30 | 2,400 | 732 | Gravel |

Bancroft Airport, also known as Jack Brown Airport (Transport Canada: CNW3) is an airport near Bancroft, Ontario, Canada, operated by the Bancroft Flying Club.

== Description ==
Bancroft Airport, also known as Jack Brown airport is a community airport located three kilometres from Bancroft, Ontario. It had the Transport Canada identifier of CNW3.

The airport located at 1,085 feet above mean sea level. It has the helipad for the North Hastings Hospital. The airpot has a small terminal building and sits on a parcel of land that is 78 acres, within the municipality of the Town of Bancroft.

In 2016, the airport saw around 300 flights per year, with half being government agency helicopters.

The airport has one gravel airstrip that is 2,400 feet long and 40 feet wide.

== Management ==
The airport is operated by the non profit organization Bancroft Flying Club.

Pat Murdock was the airport manager in 2016.

== Operational history ==
The location of Bancroft Airpot was previously a farm owned by George Clark, the Hawyley family, George Selkirk's company Southern Securities, before Jack Brown bought the land. The airport is also known as Jack Brown Airport, name after Bancroft Reeve Jack Brown.

The airport was granted an operational license around early October 1963. The license allowed for flying lessons and airport traffic. The first instructor was John Strickland. The airport was opened on 6 October 1963.

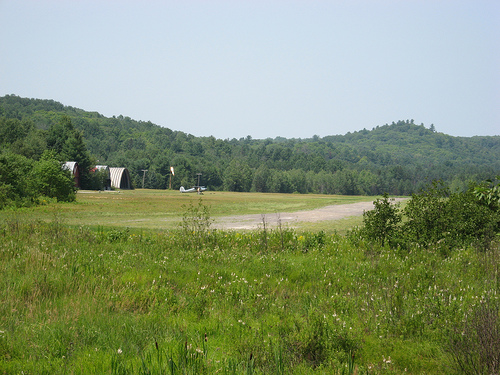
Bancroft Airport, 2007

The gravel airstrip was resurfaced in 1973.

In 1983, residents protested the loss of the airport's license. Transport Canada had revoked the airport's license, stating that the airport was unsafe due to the presence of two nearby hills. In 1985, Bill Vaknoughnet presented the club with a new licence, after the revocation was reversed.

== Safety incidents ==
In 1963, Ronald Tyron escaped from his burning plane immediately after landing in Bancroft Airport.

In 1989 a pilot escaped with a sprained finger after flipping his plane, while landing in the snow-covered airport.

On 8 August 2003, two people were injured when a biplane that took off from the airport crashed 350 metres from the end of the runway.

== See also ==
- List of airports in Ontario
