= North Hastings Heritage Museum =

Bancroft, Ontario museum

Coordinates: 45°03′35″N 77°51′31″W

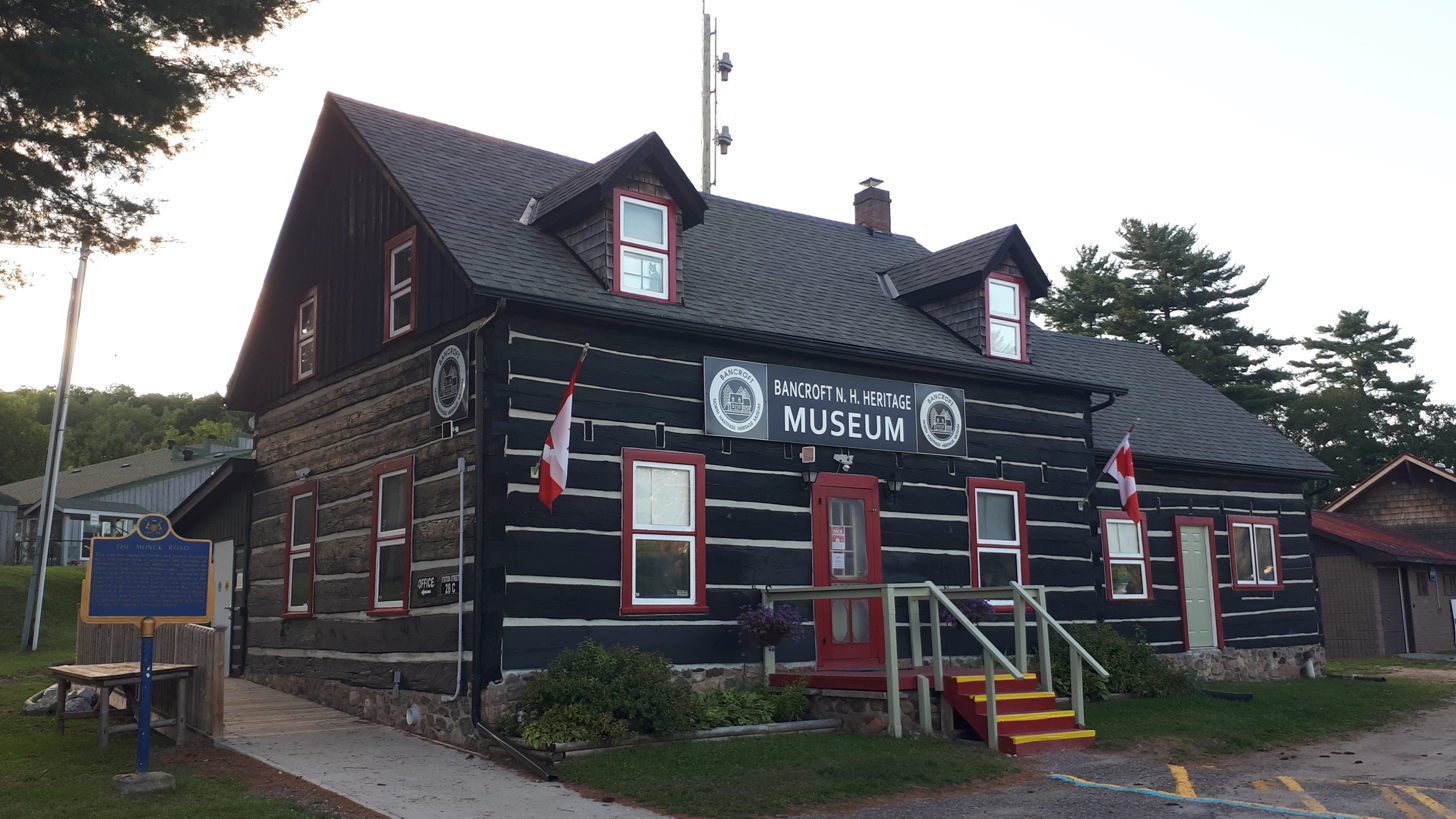
- Founded: 1967
- Location: Bancroft, Ontario
- Director: Mary Kavanagh
- Chair of the Board: Alan Woodcox
- Website: https://bancroftnhheritagemuseum.ca/

North Hastings Heritage Museum is a community museum of history, located in Bancroft, Ontario.

The museum was opened by John Churcher 1967, as part of the Canadian Centennial celebrations.

The museum's building was moved to its current location in 1966 after previously being the private home of the Dysert family, before being the office of the Bronson-Weston Lumber company.

In 2018, as part of the 150th anniversary of Canada, the museum was awarded $85,000 of renovations for funding.

In 2018, the museum launched its School Program. The program was supported by a $73,700 from the Government of Ontario.

The museum has published the books Seniors of North Hastings Childhood Memories and Honouring the Woman of North Hastings.

The museum is managed by Mary Kavanagh. The chair of the museum's board of directors is Alan Woodcox. It is located on Station Street, near the York River, in Riverside Park. The museum building also houses Hastings North Tourism Service.
