= Red Cross Hospital, Bancroft =

Former hospital in Ontario, Canada

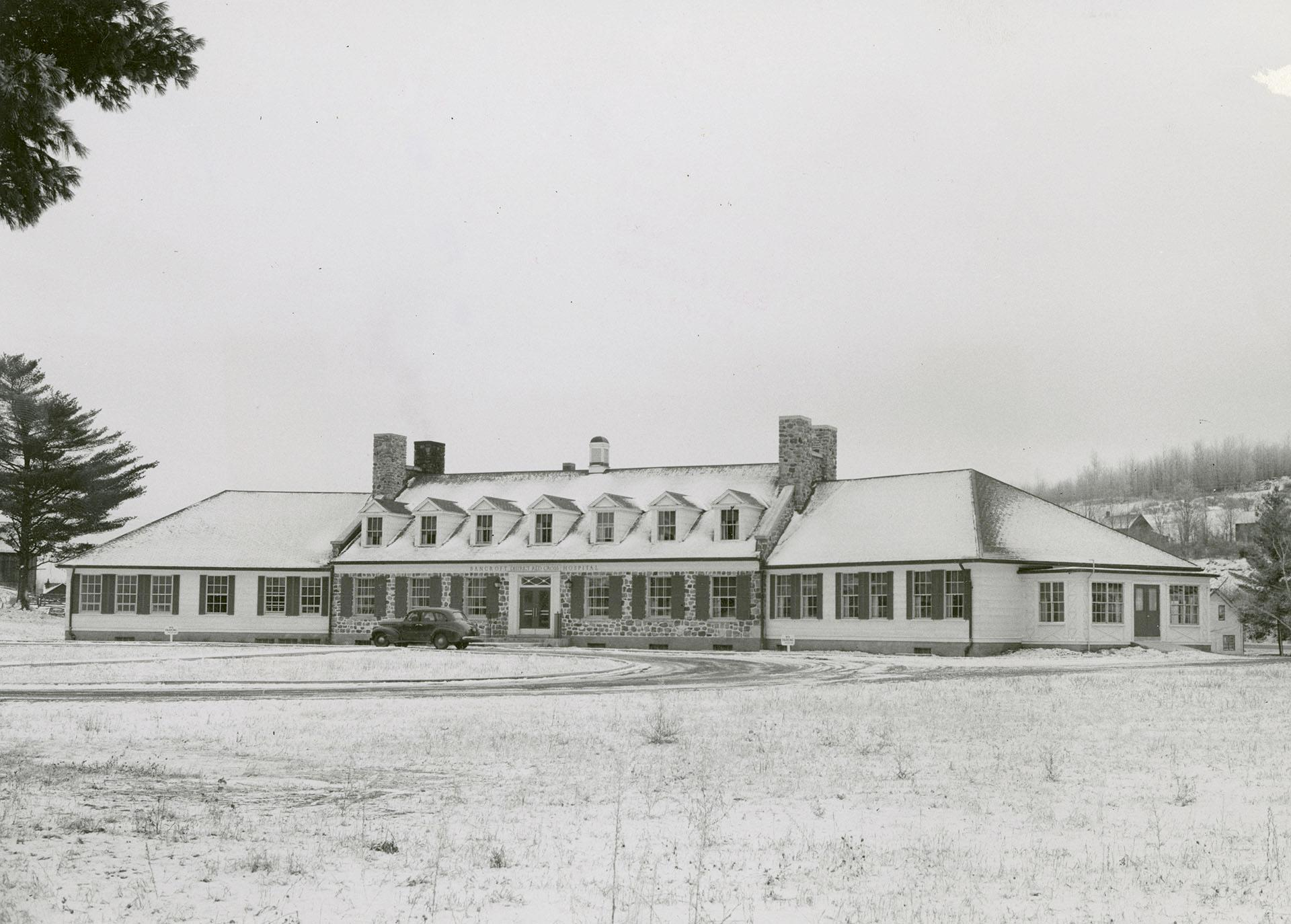
The hospital in 1951

The Red Cross Hospital in Bancroft (later known as Bancroft Hospital) opened in 1949 and was one of the first custom designed and built Red Cross hospitals in Ontario. It took over responsibilities from the previous Red Cross health post in Bancroft.

Belleville General Hospital took over the hospital in 1983 and the hospital was closed in 2002 when a new one was built on Manor Lane, Bancroft.

== History ==
Around 1919, in the aftermath of World War I, the Red Cross was pivoting away from only international health work in conflict zones and started providing health care in Canada. In 1922, the Ontario division of the Canadian Red Cross opened their first health post Wilberforce Red Cross Outpost. Following 1922, more healthcare facilities were created, always in pre-existing structures. The first health post was opened in Bancroft in 1927 when the population of the town was 911 people. In the 1947, the Canadian Red Cross changed towards building its own hospitals and started constructing Wiarton Hospital which opened in 1949. As of 2022, Wiarton hospital is operated by Grey Bruce Health Services. Also in 1949, it started building three identical hospitals, replicating Wiarton hospital's design in Bancroft, Burk's Falls and Nipigon, as well as a larger 27-bed hospital in Huntsville.

Prior to the hospital, Bancroft only had a health post, which was dealing with many serious injuries from the nearby uranium mines. Injuries from the mines included crushed chests, broken limbs and abdominal penetrations. While the health post was able to stabilise and send patients to Peterborough for treatment, there was a perceived need for a full hospital in Bancroft. The hospital's construction was two-thirds funded by the provincial and federal governments.

Consistently through the 1950s', 60's, and 70's, the Red Cross was finding it difficult to employ nurses in rural hospitals, as the rural Canadian workforce relocated to Toronto. The cost of running hospitals also increased, both factors combined prompted the Red Cross national leadership to pressure their Ontario division to divest from running hospitals. Bellville General Hospital took over Bancroft hospital in 1983 and the hospital was closed in 2002 when a new hospital was opened on Manor Lane in Bancroft, operated by Quinte Health Care. The former hospital was initially used by Ontario Provincial Police before being turned into Riverstone retirement home.
