= McKenzie Lake (Nipissing District) =

Lake in Ontario, Canada

- lac McKenzie
- Location in Ontario
- Location: Nipissing District and Hastings County, Ontario
- Coordinates: 45°21′51″N 78°01′22″W
- Part of: Saint Lawrence River drainage basin
- Primary inflows: Moore Creek
- Primary outflows: Moore Creek
- Basin countries: Canada
- Max. length: 3.5 km (2.2 mi)
- Max. width: 1.1 m (3 ft 7 in)
- Surface elevation: 395 m (1,296 ft)
- Settlements: McKenzie Lake

McKenzie Lake (French: lac McKenzie) is a lake in South Algonquin, Nipissing District and Hastings Highlands, Hastings County in Ontario, Canada. It is in the Saint Lawrence River drainage basin, is part of the Madawaska River river system, and lies about 14 kilometres (9 mi) south of the community of Madawaska and a similar distance north of the small town of Maynooth. The settlement of McKenzie Lake is on the north shore of the lake.

McKenzie Lake is about 3.5 kilometres (2.2 mi) long and 1.1 kilometres (0.7 mi) wide and lies at an elevation of 395 metres (1,296 ft). It is roughly L-shaped, with the long axis running south-southwest to north-northeast, and the smaller extension running to about 1.5 kilometres (0.93 mi) to the south off the western end. The lake is almost entirely in South Algonquin, Nipissing District, except for the southwestern tip, which is in Hastings Highlands, Hastings County, and thus straddles the traditional boundary between northern and southern Ontario, more specifically Nipissing District in Northeastern Ontario and Hastings County in Central Ontario.

The primary inflow is Moore Creek at the east, arriving from the direction of Cross Lake, with another unnamed inflow at the west; there are several other secondary unnamed inflows, including one at the south arriving from North Chainy Lake, one at the extreme southern tip of the lake from the direction of Lake St. Peter, and another arriving at the northeast from Turf Lake. The primary outflow, at the northern tip of the lake, is also Moore Creek, which heads north towards Moore Lake, and then flows via the Madawaska River and the Ottawa River to the Saint Lawrence River.

The shore of the southwestern tip of the lake is part of Lake St. Peter Provincial Park, but none of the lake itself.

== See also ==
- List of lakes in Ontario
