= Ontario Highway 60 =

Ontario provincial highway

Highway 60
- Frank A. McDougall Parkway

Route information
- Maintained by the Ministry of Transportation of Ontario
- Length: 255.8 km (158.9 mi)
- Existed: September 22, 1937–present

Major junctions
- West end: Highway 11 – Huntsville
- Highway 127 – Whitney; Highway 41 – Eganville
- East end: Highway 17 – Renfrew

Location
- Country: Canada
- Province: Ontario

Highway system
- Ontario provincial highways; Current; Former; 400-series
← Highway 58A	→ Highway 61
Former provincial highways
← Highway 59

King's Highway 60, commonly referred to as Highway 60, is a provincially maintained highway in the Canadian province of Ontario. The 255.8-kilometre (158.9 mi) highway serves as the primary corridor through Algonquin Provincial Park, where it is dedicated as the Frank McDougall Parkway. East of Algonquin Park, the route serves east–west traffic in the highlands of central Ontario. It begins at Highway 11 in Huntsville and ends at Highway 17 near Renfrew.

Highway 60 was designated in 1937 between Huntsville and Lake Dore, near where it met Highway 41. During the 1940s, the route shared a common termini with Highway 41 at Golden Lake. When Highway 41 was extended north to Pembroke in 1957, Highway 60 was routed along it between Golden Lake and Eganville. It was extended east to Highway 17 in downtown Renfrew circa 1961. It was extended further east when Highway 17 was rerouted around Renfrew in 1977, establishing the current route.

== Route description ==
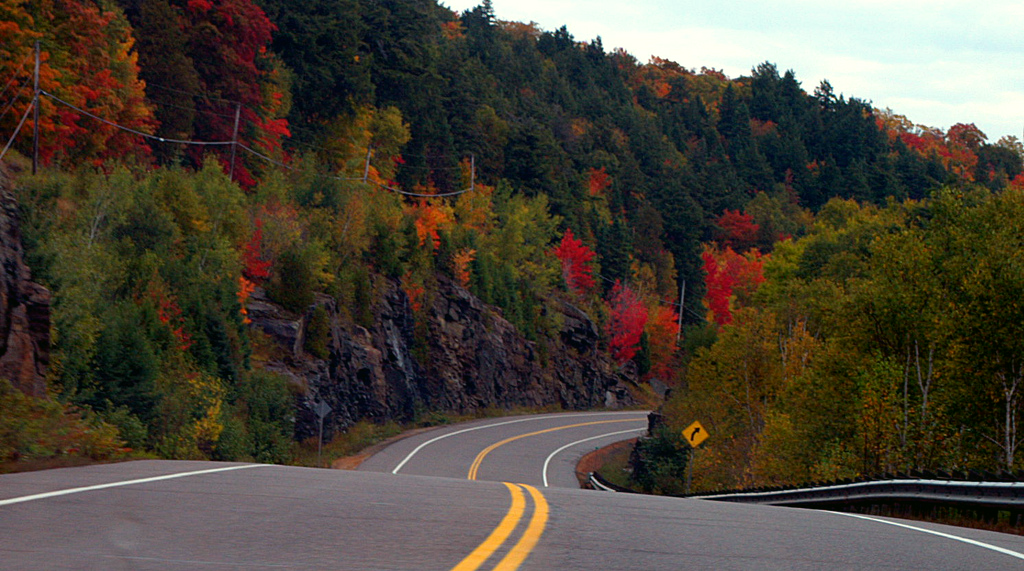
Highway 60 and Algonquin Park are renowned for their autumn displays.

Highway 60 begins at an interchange with Highway 11 in Huntsville. It crosses through central Ontario in a generally east–west orientation. The triangle-shaped area bounded by Highways 11, 17 and 60 is largely uninhabited wilderness dotted with lakes and muskeg.

East of Huntsville, Highway 60 meanders east then south through the northeastern corner of Muskoka District, meeting Highway 35 at Dwight. It travels northeast from there, briefly passing through Haliburton County before crossing into Nipissing District and entering Algonquin Park. An Ontario Parks visitor's permit is not required to drive through Algonquin Park. However, one is required for the use of any trails, campgrounds, the Visitor Centre, or similar facilities within the park boundary. Moose and deer are very common through Algonquin, especially at night and in the morning, and present a major driving hazard. The 56-kilometre (35 mi) journey through Algonquin Park offers some of the most famous scenery in Canada, including vistas of numerous lakes and geological formations that have been captured in the arts of Group of Seven painter Tom Thomson among others. The park is considered the most important place in Canada for biological and environmental research.

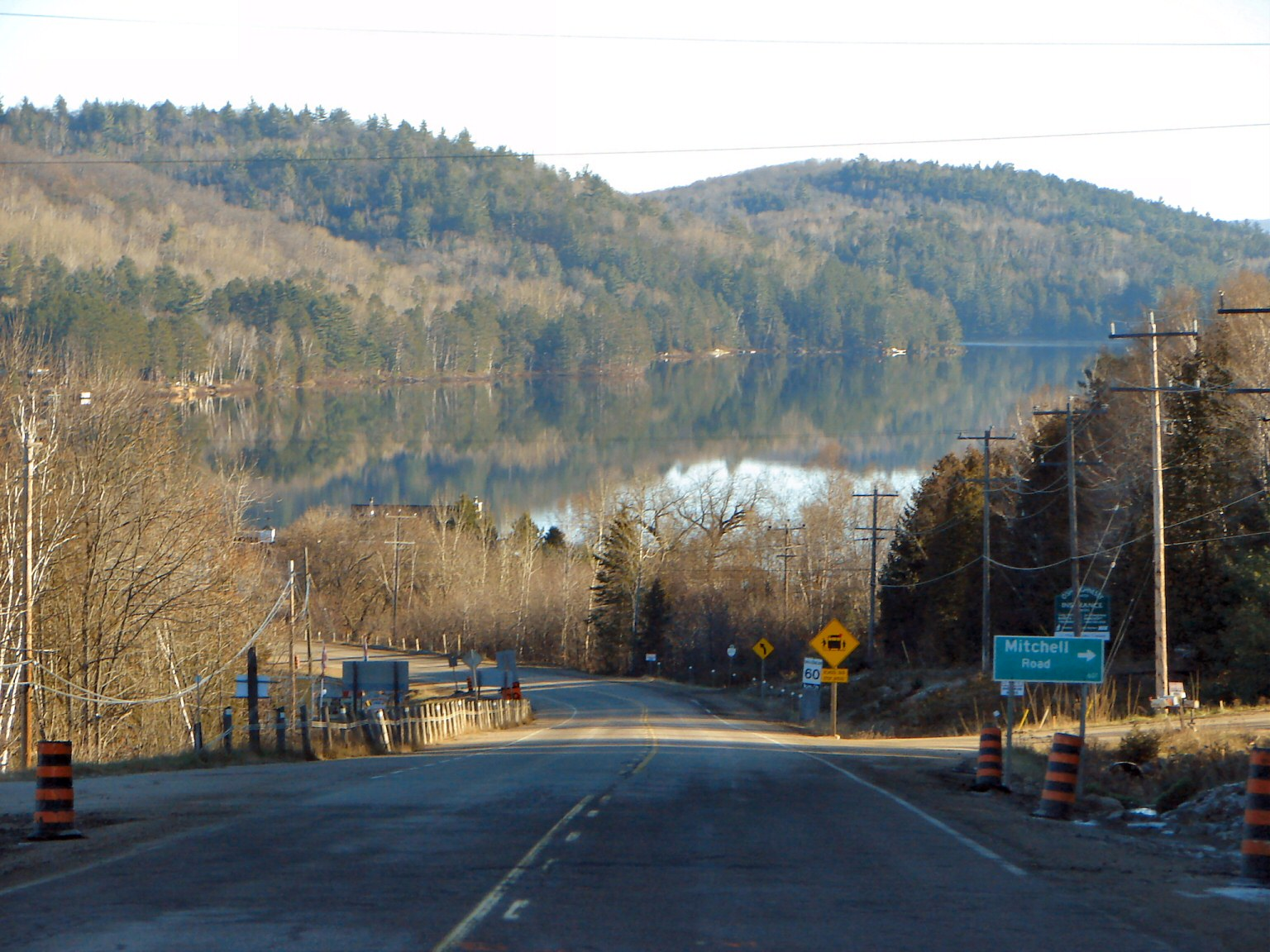
Highway 60 between Barry's Bay and Whitney.

Highway 60 exits the park in the Township of South Algonquin travelling south into Whitney, curving east and intersecting Highway 127. Beyond Highway 127, it passes through the Madawaska Highlands, following the historic Opeongo Line. It passes through Madawaska, encountering Secondary Highway 523, then curves southeast into Renfrew County. The route enters Barry's Bay, where it turns east and meets the southern leg of former Highway 62, where a concurrency with it began prior to 1998. After passing through Wilno, the route curves northeast around Killaloe, intersecting the northern leg of former Highway 62 and Highway 512.

Continuing around Golden Lake and through the village of the same name, Highway 60 travels southeast into the Ottawa Valley towards Eganville, where it has a 3.9 kilometres (2.4 mi) concurrency with Highway 41. For the remainder of the route, the highway travels near the Bonnechere River. It continues east then south to Douglas, where drivers must turn northeast to continue along the highway. Highway 60 slowly curves southeast before entering the town of Renfrew, where it is known as Stewart Street, Bridge Street, Raglan Street South, Veterans Memorial Boulevard and O'Brien Road. It encounters the eastern terminus of Highway 132 before curving east to end at Highway 17 on the outskirts of the town.

== History ==
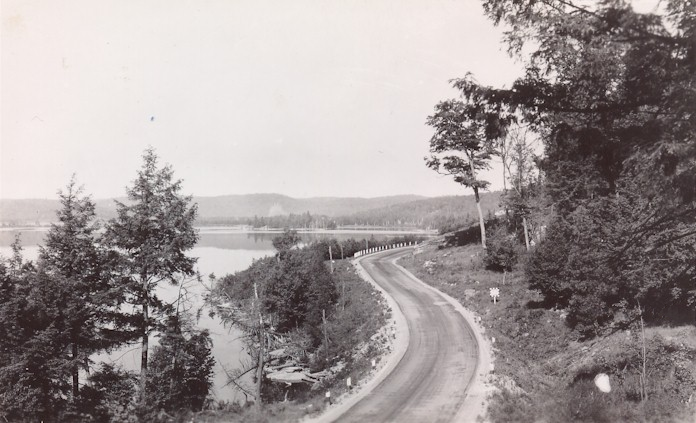
Highway 60 through Algonquin Park circa 1950

Highway 60 was established in 1937, when the Department of Northern Development was amalgamated by the Department of Highways (DHO). The section of the route through Nipissing District (through Algonquin Park) was assumed by the DHO on September 22, followed by the section through Renfrew County on September 29, and finally the section through Muskoka District on October 6. At that time, the highway ended in Lake Dore, north of Eganville and was 218.2 km (135.6 mi) long. Highway 41 travelled along the portion of what is now Highway 60 between Eganville and Golden Lake. The route was shortened by 16.9 kilometres (10.5 mi) to create a shared terminus with Highway 41 between 1942 and 1949.

On April 11, 1957, the Eganville–Pembroke Road was assumed as an extension of Highway 41, with the former portion of the route between Eganville and Golden Lake being renumbered as part of Highway 60. Highway 60 was extended to Highway 17 near Rosebank, north of Renfrew, circa 1961. With the construction of the Renfrew Bypass, which began in June 1974, and was completed in 1977, the section of Highway 17 between O'Brien Road east of Renfrew and Haley Road north of Haley Station was renumbered as an extension of Highway 60, establishing the current route of the highway.

In 1976, the section through Algonquin Park was dedicated in honour of the 35 years of service by Frank Archibald MacDougall: ten years as park superintendent and 25 as Deputy Minister of Lands and Forests. It is signed as the Frank MacDougall Parkway.

== Major intersections ==
The following table lists the major junctions along Highway 60, as noted by the Ministry of Transportation of Ontario.

Division	Location	km	mi	Destinations	Notes
Muskoka	Huntsville	0.0	0.0	Highway 11 – Toronto, North Bay	Highway 11 exit 223
Muskoka	Huntsville	2.5	1.6	District Road 3 (Main Street)	
Muskoka	Huntsville	6.7	4.2	District Road 23 (Canal Road)	
Muskoka	Lake of Bays	12.7	7.9	District Road 8 east (Limberlost Road)	
Muskoka	Lake of Bays	18.4	11.4	District Road 9 south (South Portage Road)	
Muskoka	Lake of Bays	23.6	14.7	Highway 35 – Dorset, Minden	Dwight
Haliburton	No major junctions				
Nipissing	Algonquin Provincial Park	43.6	27.1	Algonquin Park West Gate	
Nipissing	Algonquin Provincial Park	58.4	36.3	Smoke Lake Road	
Nipissing	Algonquin Provincial Park	91.7	57.0	Opeongo Lake Road	
Nipissing	Algonquin Provincial Park	99.4	61.8	Algonquin Park East Gate	
Nipissing	South Algonquin	109.6	68.1	Highway 127 south – Maynooth	Whitney
Nipissing	South Algonquin	128.5	79.8	Highway 523 south	Madawaska
Renfrew	Madawaska Valley	156.3	97.1		Beginning of Barry's Bay Connecting Link Agreement
Renfrew	Madawaska Valley	156.8	97.4	County Road 62 – Maynooth	Formerly Highway 62 south; former western end of Highway 62 concurrency
Renfrew	Madawaska Valley	157.6	97.9	Old Barry's Bay Road	End of Barry's Bay Connecting Link Agreement
Renfrew	Madawaska Valley–Killaloe, Hagarty and Richards boundary	166.9	103.7	County Road 66 south (Wilno Road South)	Wilno
Renfrew	Killaloe, Hagarty and Richards	173.0	107.5	County Road 67 north (Simpson Pit Road)	
Renfrew	Killaloe, Hagarty and Richards	180.9	112.4	County Road 58 north (Round Lake Road) – Pembroke, Round Lake; County Road 512 south (Queen Street) – Killaloe, Brudenell	Killaloe; formerly Highway 62 north / Highway 512 south; former eastern end of Highway 62 concurrency
Renfrew	North Algona Wilberforce	199.6	124.0	County Road 30 east (Lake Dore Road) – Germanicus; County Road 70 west (Kokomis Inamo)	Golden Lake
Renfrew	North Algona Wilberforce	209.7	130.3	Highway 41 north – Pembroke	Western end of Highway 41 concurrency
Renfrew	Bonnechere Valley	212.8	132.2		Beginning of Eganville Connecting Link Agreement
Renfrew	Bonnechere Valley	213.6	132.7	Highway 41 south (Bridge Street) – Denbigh, Kaladar	Eastern end of Highway 41 concurrency
Renfrew	Bonnechere Valley	214.9	133.5		End of Eganville Connecting Link Agreement
Renfrew	North Algona Wilberforce–Admaston/Bromley boundary	222.2	138.1	County Road 8 east (Cobden Road) – Cobden County Road 9 north (Bulger Road) – Lake Dore	Kellys Corner
Renfrew	Admaston/Bromley	229.7	142.7	County Road 5 south (Stone Road)	Douglas
Renfrew	Admaston/Bromley	242.6	150.7	County Road 61 south (Haley Road)	Rosebank; former Highway 17 alignment
Renfrew	Renfrew	250.0	155.3		Beginning of Renfrew Connecting Link Agreement
Renfrew	Renfrew	250.8	155.8	County Road 20 east (Bruce Street)	
Renfrew	Renfrew	251.8	156.5	Highway 132 west (Munroe Avenue)	
Renfrew	Renfrew	252.6	157.0	County Road 52 south (Raglan Street)	
Renfrew	Renfrew	254.2	158.0	County Road 6 east (Gillan Road)	
Renfrew	Renfrew	255.1	158.5		End of Renfrew Connecting Link Agreement
Renfrew	Horton	255.8	158.9	Highway 17 / TCH – Ottawa, Pembroke	
1.000 mi = 1.609 km; 1.000 km = 0.621 mi: Concurrency terminus
