= Lake St. Peter =

Lake St. Peter may refer to:

- Lac Saint-Pierre, part of the St. Lawrence River in Quebec, Canada
- Lake St. Peter (Ontario), a lake in Ontario, Canada
- Lake St. Peter, Ontario, or Hastings Highlands a hamlet in Ontario, Canada
- Lake St. Peter Provincial Park, Ontario
