= Moore Creek (Nipissing District) =

Moore Creek ruisseau Moore
- Location of the mouth of Moore Creek in Ontario

Location
- Country: Canada
- Province: Ontario
- Region: Northeastern Ontario
- District: Nipissing
- Municipality: South Algonquin

Physical characteristics
- Source: Cross Lake
  - coordinates: 45°23′17″N 77°57′26″W
  - elevation: 441 m (1,447 ft)
- Mouth: Madawaska River
  - coordinates: 45°29′19″N 77°58′25″W
  - elevation: 314 m (1,030 ft)

Basin features
- River system: Saint Lawrence River drainage basin
- Tributaries
  - left: Pastwa Creek
  - right: Coghlan Creek

Moore Creek (French: ruisseau Moore) is a creek in South Algonquin, Nipissing District in Northeastern Ontario, Canada. It is in the Saint Lawrence River drainage basin and is a left tributary of the Madawaska River.

== Hydrology ==
Moore Creek begins at Cross Lake at an elevation of 441 metres (1,447 ft) and travels 5 kilometres (3.1 mi) southwest to McKenzie Lake at an elevation of 395 metres (1,296 ft). The creek then flows north 6.5 kilometres (4.0 mi) towards Moore Lake at an elevation of 380 metres (1,247 ft), taking in the right tributary Coghlan Creek from Coghlan Lake along the way. Pastwa Creek from Pastwa Lake enters as a left tributary at Moore Lake itself. Finally, the Moore Creek heads 7 kilometres (4.3 mi) north, passing under Ontario Highway 523, to its mouth at the Madawaska River, at an elevation of 314 metres (1,030 ft). The Madawaska River flows via the Ottawa River to the Saint Lawrence River.

The creek is entirely in South Algonquin, Nipissing District, but part of the drainage basin, like the southern end of McKenzie Lake and some other tributaries flowing from the south, is in Hastings Highlands, Hastings County.

== Tributaries ==
- Pastwa Creek (left)
- Coghlan Creek (right)

== See also ==
- List of rivers of Ontario

== Sources ==
- "Toporama - Topographic Map Sheet 31F5". Atlas of Canada. Natural Resources Canada. Archived from the original on 2010-02-10.
