= Cross Lake (South Algonquin) =

Lake in South Algonquin, Ontario, Canada

- lac Cross
- Location in Ontario
- Location: Nipissing District, Ontario
- Coordinates: 45°23′48″N 77°56′36″W
- Part of: Saint Lawrence River drainage basin
- Primary inflows: Four unnamed creeks
- Primary outflows: Moore Creek
- Basin countries: Canada
- Max. length: 3.6 km (2.2 mi)
- Max. width: 2.3 km (1.4 mi)
- Surface elevation: 441 m (1,447 ft)
- Settlements: Cross Lake

Cross Lake (French: lac Cross) is a lake in South Algonquin, Nipissing District, Ontario, Canada, about 12 kilometres (7 mi) south of the community of Madawaska. Ontario Highway 523 runs just east of the lake, and the settlement of Cross Lake lies between the highway and the lake.

== Hydrology ==
Cross Lake is in the Saint Lawrence River drainage basin, is about 3.6 kilometres (2.2 mi) long and 2.3 kilometres (1.4 mi) wide and lies at an elevation of 441 metres (1,447 ft). The name refers to its roughly cross-like shape, with one line running from the northwest to southeast, and the other from west-southwest to east-northeast.

There are four unnamed creek inflows, one at the west, one at the south, one at the north from Lyell Long Lake and one at the southeast from Hawk Lake. The primary outflow, at the southwest, is Moore Creek towards McKenzie Lake, which flows into the Madawaska River, and via the Ottawa River into the St. Lawrence River.

== See also ==
- List of lakes in Ontario
