= Ontario Highway 523 =

Ontario provincial highway

Highway 523

Route information
- Maintained by the Ministry of Transportation of Ontario
- Length: 20.0 km (12.4 mi)

Major junctions
- South end: Nipissing–Hastings boundary
- North end: Highway 60 in Madawaska

Location
- Country: Canada
- Province: Ontario
- Districts: Nipissing

Highway system
- Ontario provincial highways; Current; Former; 400-series
← Highway 522B	→ Highway 524

Secondary Highway 523, commonly referred to as Highway 523, is a provincially maintained highway in the Canadian province of Ontario. The highway is a 20.0-kilometre (12.4 mi) north–south route in Nipissing District which follows the historic Madawaska Colonization Road. The highway begins at the Nipissing–Hastings boundary, where it continues south to Highway 127. It ends at Highway 60 in the village of Madawaska. The route was assumed as a provincial highway in 1956.

== Route description ==
Highway 523 begins at the boundary between the Hastings County and Nipissing District, east of Algonquin Provincial Park. From here the road continues south as the Madawaska Road to Maynooth, where it meets the Peterson Road and Hastings Road, all former Colonization Roads which served to open the northern frontier to settlement in the 1850s. North of the boundary, the Highway begins and is known as Cross Lake Road. It passes through a sparsely populated region dotted with lakes and muskeg, generally remaining straight, though curving sporadically to avoid the many obstacles presented by the Canadian Shield.

After passing through the village of Cross Lake, situated on the eastern shore of a lake with the same name, the highway abruptly curves to the east for 1 kilometre (0.62 mi). It turns back to the north and later approaches the northwestern tip of Bark Lake, on the opposite shore as Bell Bay Provincial Park. Here the highway curves to the west and follows the delta of the Madawaska River, curving north just short of entering the village of Madawaska. It ends at an intersection with Highway 60.

== History ==
Highway 523 was first designated along with many of the secondary highways in Ontario in 1956. The route was paved at the time of assumption, and has remained the same since.

== Major intersections ==
The following table lists the major junctions along Highway 523, as noted by the Ministry of Transportation of Ontario. The entirety of the highway is located within Nipissing District.

Division	Location	km	mi	Destinations	Notes
Hastings–Nipissing boundary	Hastings Highlands – South Algonquin boundary	0.0	0.0		Division boundary line; road continues south as Madawaska Colonization Road
Nipissing	South Algonquin	20.0	12.4	Highway 60 – Whitney, Barry's Bay	
1.000 mi = 1.609 km; 1.000 km = 0.621 mi
