= Big Mink Lake =

Fresh water lake in Hastings County, Ontario, Canada

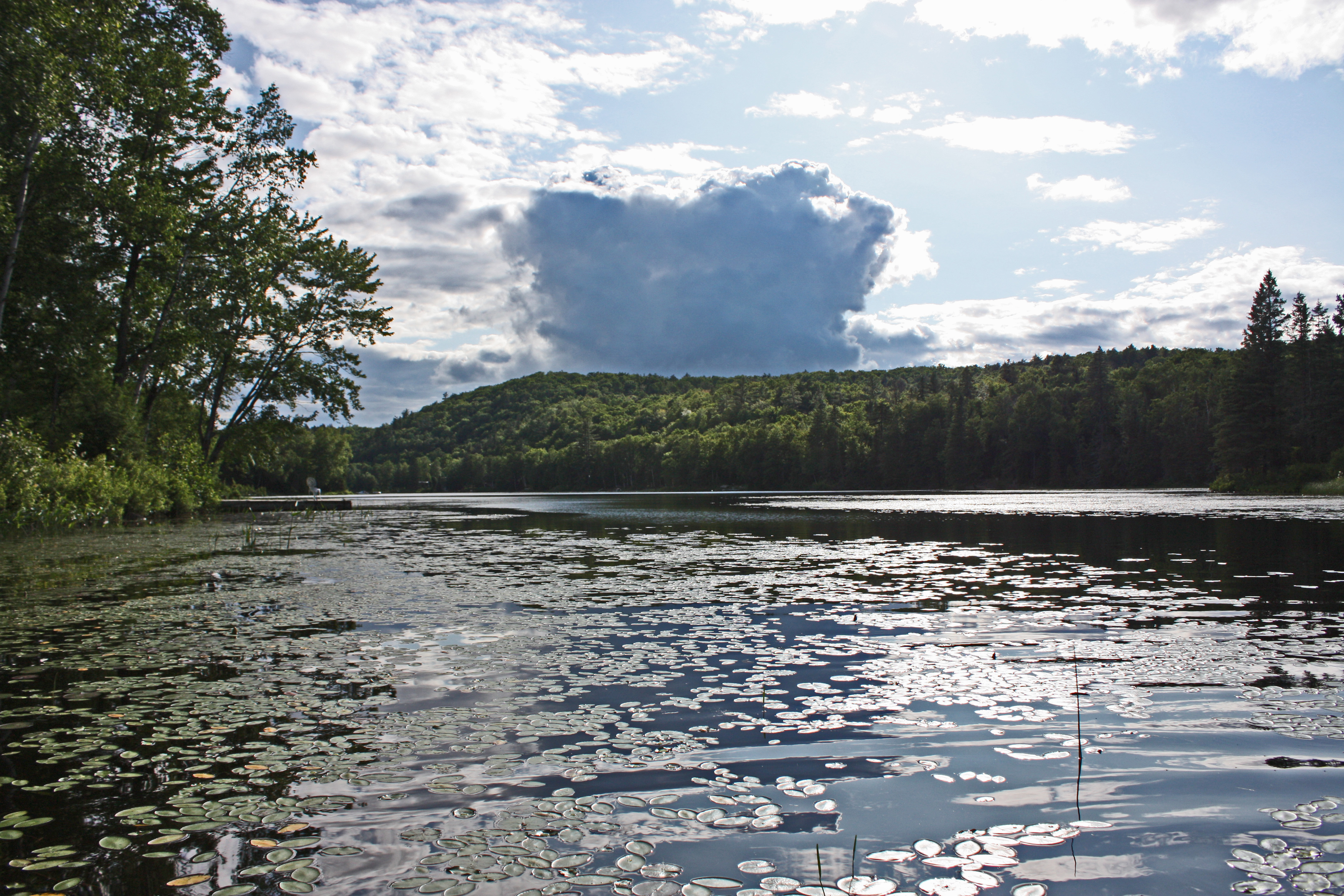
- View from the dock of a cottage of Big Mink Lake

- Location within Ontario
- Location: Hastings Highlands, Hastings County
- Coordinates: 45°15′09″N 78°04′41″W
- Primary inflows: Mink Creek; seven unnamed creeks
- Primary outflows: Mink Creek
- Basin countries: Canada
- Max. length: 7.2 km (4.5 mi)
- Max. width: 0.7 km (0.43 mi)
- Surface area: 1.96 km^{2} (0.76 sq mi)
- Max. depth: 24 m (79 ft)
- Surface elevation: 402 m (1,319 ft)
- Frozen: December–April

Big Mink Lake is a fresh water lake in the St. Lawrence River drainage basin in Hastings Highlands, Hastings County, Ontario, Canada. It is about 5 kilometres (3.1 mi) west of the community of Lake St. Peter on Highway 127 and 25 kilometres (16 mi) northwest of Bancroft.

== Hydrology ==
Big Mink Lake is a long narrow lake punctuated by several narrows and with a forked north end. Card Bay forms the northwest arm of the fork, and the three narrows from north to south are First Narrows, Red Pine Narrows and Crooked Narrows. The lake is about 7.2 kilometres (4.5 mi) long and 0.7 kilometres (0.4 mi) wide and lies at an elevation of 402 metres (1,319 ft). The primary inflow is Mink Creek from Upper Mink Lakes at the northeast. There are seven unnamed creeks as secondary inflows: at the northeast, east from Sud Lake, southeast, south, southwest, west, and northwest. The primary outflow, controlled by the Mink Lake Dam, is also Mink Creek, southwest to Moffat Pond, which eventually flows via the York River, Madawaska River and Ottawa River to the St. Lawrence River.

== See also ==
- List of lakes in Ontario
