= Lake St. Peter Provincial Park =

Provincial park in Ontario, Canada

- IUCN category II (national park)
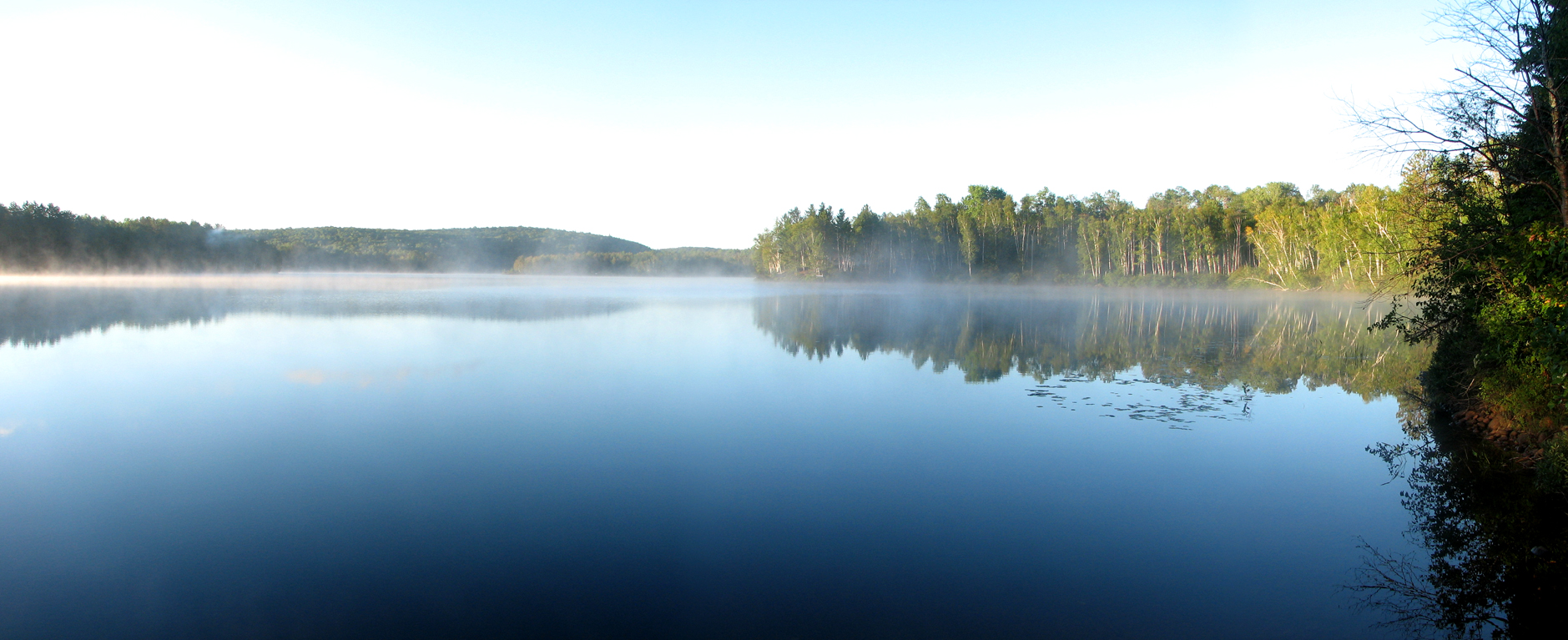
- Lake St. Peter

- Location within Southern Ontario
- Interactive map of Lake St. Peter Provincial Park
- Location: Hastings County, Ontario, Canada
- Nearest city: Lake St. Peter, Ontario
- Coordinates: 45°20′04″N 78°01′24″W
- Area: 478 ha (1,180 acres)
- Established: 1971
- Visitors: 21,431 (in 2022)
- Governing body: Ontario Parks
- Website: https://www.ontarioparks.ca/park/lakestpeter

Lake St. Peter Provincial Park is a recreation-class provincial park in the municipality of Hastings Highlands, Hastings County, Ontario, Canada. It is operated by the Ontario Parks branch of the Ontario Ministry of Natural Resources and Forestry.

The park is located on Lake St. Peter near the community of the same name, 2 km (1.2 mi) off Highway 127. It is 478 hectares (1,180 acres) in area with 65 campsites, two beaches and two hiking trails. The main access gatehouse also contains a small store supplying minimal camping equipment, firewood, ice and rental canoes.

The shore of the southwestern tip of McKenzie Lake is part of the park, at its northern edge, but none of the lake itself.
