= 2010 Hastings County municipal elections =

Local election in Ontario, Canada

Elections were held in Hastings County, Ontario on October 25, 2010, in conjunction with municipal elections across the province.

== Hastings County Council ==
Elected	Position
Bancroft Mayor	Bernice Jenkins
Centre Hastings Reeve	Owen Ketcheson
Carlow/Mayo Reeve	Bonnie Adams
Deseronto Mayor	Norman J. Clark
Faraday Reeve	Carl Tinney
Hastings Highlands Mayor	Ron Emond
Limerick Reeve	David Golem
Madoc Reeve	Robert Sager
Marmora and Lake Reeve	Terry Clemens
Stirling-Rawdon Mayor	Rodney Cooney
Tudor and Cashel Reeve	Wanda Donaldson
Tweed Reeve	Jo-Anne Albert
Tyendinaga Reeve	Rick Phillips
Wollaston Reeve	Dan McCaw

== Bancroft ==
Mayoral Candidate	Vote	%
Bernice Jenkins	1,708	
Larry McTaggart	374	

== Carlow/Mayo ==
Reeve Candidate	Vote	%
Bonnie Adams	283	
David Panabaker (X)	254	

== Centre Hastings ==
Reeve Candidate	Vote	%
Owen Ketcheson	1,305	
Tom Deline (X)	1,095	

== Deseronto ==
Mayoral Candidate	Vote	%
Norman J. Clark (X)	Acclaimed	

== Faraday ==
Reeve Candidate	Vote	%
Carl Tinney (X)	Acclaimed	

== Hastings Highlands ==
Mayoral Candidate	Vote	%
Ron Emond (X)	1,926	
Ted Jeffery	1,073	
Joe Campbell	478	

== Limerick ==
Reeve Candidate	Vote	%
David Golem (X)	Acclaimed	

== Madoc ==
Reeve Candidate	Vote	%
Roger Sager (X)	Acclaimed	

== Marmora and Lake ==
Reeve Candidate	Vote	%
Terry Clemens (X)	Acclaimed	

== Stirling-Rawdon ==
Mayoral Candidate	Vote	%
Rodney Cooney	1,062	
Vicky Adamson	678	
Rob Bastedo	578	

== Tudor and Cashel ==
Reeve Candidate	Vote	%
Wanda Donaldson (X)	384	
Terry Middleton	260	

== Tweed ==
Reeve Candidate	Vote	%
Jo-Anne Albert (X)	1,979	
Lynda Akey	981	
Tony Singarajah	91	

== Tyendinaga ==
Reeve Candidate	Vote	%
Rick Phillips	934	
Fred Lang	459	

== Wollaston ==
Reeve Candidate	Vote	%
Dan McCaw (X)	503	
Bob Ireland	422	
