= 2014 Hastings County municipal elections =

Local election in Ontario, Canada

Elections were held in Hastings County, Ontario, Canada, on October 27, 2014, in conjunction with municipal elections across the province.

== Hastings County Council ==
Hastings County Council consists of the mayors and reeves of the 14 constituent municipalities.

Elected	Position
Bancroft Mayor	Bernice Jenkins
Carlow/Mayo Reeve	Bonnie Adams
Centre Hastings Mayor	Tom Deline
Deseronto Mayor	Norman Clark
Faraday Reeve	Carl Tinney (acclaimed)
Hastings Highlands Mayor	Vivian Bloom
Limerick Reeve	Sharon Carson
Madoc Reeve	Robert Sager
Marmora and Lake Reeve	Terry Clemens
Stirling-Rawdon Mayor	Rodney Cooney
Tudor and Cashel Reeve	Wanda Donaldson
Tweed Mayor	Jo-Anne Albert (acclaimed)
Tyendinaga Reeve	Rick Phillips (acclaimed)
Wollaston Reeve	Graham Blair

== Bancroft ==
Mayoral Candidate	Vote	%
Bernice Jenkins (X)	1,043	56.44
Scott Munro	805	43.56

== Carlow/Mayo ==
Reeve Candidate	Vote	%
Bonnie Adams (X)	413	53.57
Jim Clayton	358	46.43

== Centre Hastings ==
Mayoral Candidate	Vote	%
Thomas Deline	1,445	60.16
Owen Ketcheson (X)	957	39.84

== Deseronto ==
Mayoral Candidate	Vote	%
Norman Clark (X)	410	58.57
Dennis Tompkins	290	41.43

== Faraday ==
Reeve Candidate	Vote	%
Carl Tinney (X)	Acclaimed	

== Hastings Highlands ==
Mayoral Candidate	Vote	%
Vivian Bloom (X)	1,655	51.46
Brent K. Dalgeish	1,150	35.76
Joe Campbell	411	12.78

== Limerick ==
Reeve Candidate	Vote	%
Sharon Carson	359	80
Tim Ried	~90	20

== Madoc ==
Reeve Candidate	Vote	%
Robert Sager (X)	464	54.78
John Kirkland	383	45.22

== Marmora and Lake ==
Reeve Candidate	Vote	%
Terry Clemens (X)	1,553	76.69
Kathy Hamilton	472	23.31

== Stirling-Rawdon ==
Mayoral Candidate	Vote	%
Rodney Cooney (X)	1,264	54.27
Brian T. Foley	881	37.83
Steven Spencer	184	7.90

== Tudor and Cashel ==
Reeve Candidate	Vote	%
Wanda Donaldson (X)	348	63.62
Tom Forsyth	199	36.38

== Tweed ==
Mayoral Candidate	Vote	%
Jo-Anne Albert (X)	Acclaimed	

== Tyendinaga ==
Reeve Candidate	Vote	%
Rick Phillips (X)	Acclaimed	

== Wollaston ==
Reeve Candidate	Vote	%
Graham Blair	435	46.98
Dan McCaw (X)	312	33.69
Maryann Post	179	19.33
