= Lake St. Peter (Ontario) =

Lake in Ontario, Canada

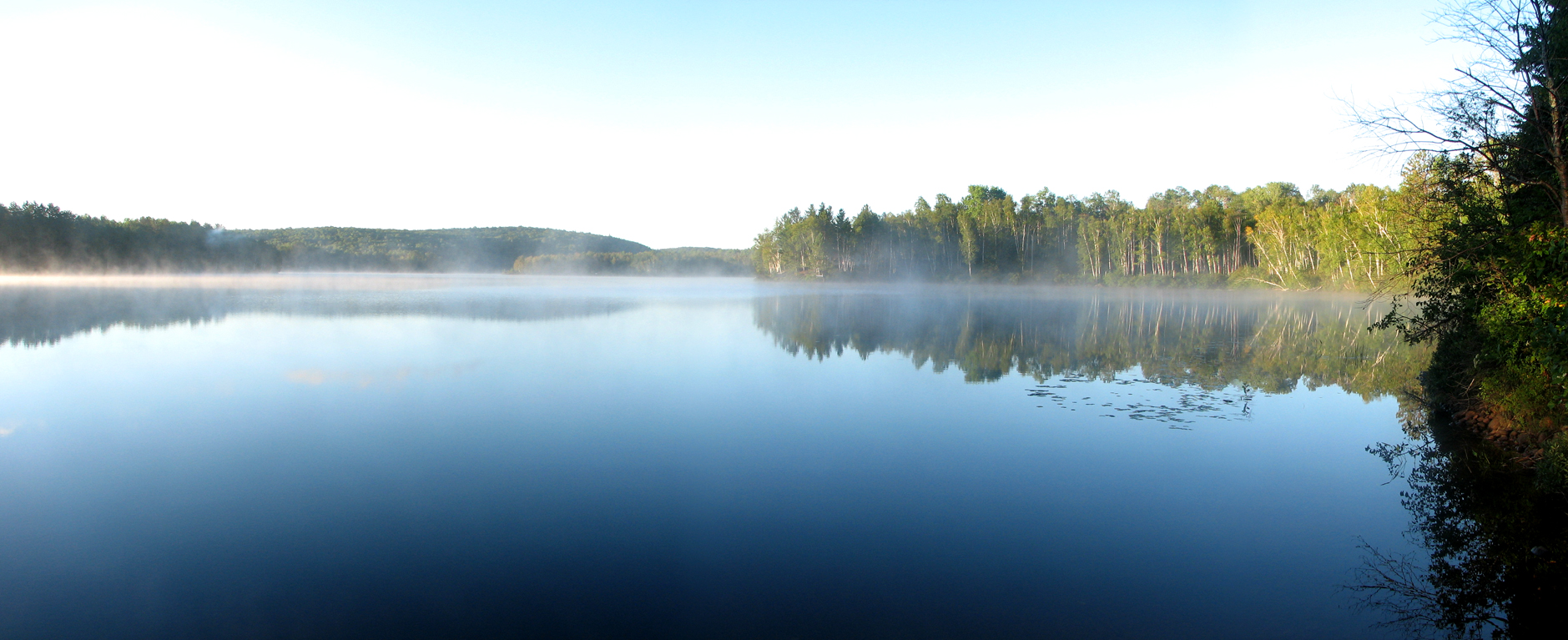
- Lake St. Peter

- Location within Ontario
- Location: Ontario, Canada
- Coordinates: 45.311°N 78.025°W
- Type: lake

Lake St. Peter is a small lake in the Canadian province of Ontario, located in Hastings Highlands near the village of the same name.

Lake St. Peter Provincial Park is located on Lake St. Peter, 2 km (1.2 mi) off Highway 127.

== See also ==
- List of lakes in Ontario
