= Vankoughnet =

Vankoughnet is a surname. Notable people with the surname include:

- Bill Vankoughnet (born 1943), Canadian politician
- Philip Michael Matthew Scott VanKoughnet (1822–1869), Canadian politician and judge
- Philip VanKoughnet (1790–1873), Canadian politician and businessman
- Gertrude Agnes VanKoughnet (c.1860–1940), Canadian socialite and second wife of Hugh John Macdonald
