= Ontario Highway 127 =

Ontario provincial highway

Highway 127
- Highway 127 highlighted in red

Route information
- Maintained by the Ministry of Transportation
- Length: 38.6 km (24.0 mi)
- Existed: October 19, 1955–present

Major junctions
- South end: Highway 62 at Maynooth
- North end: Highway 60 near Whitney

Location
- Country: Canada
- Province: Ontario

Highway system
- Ontario provincial highways; Current; Former; 400-series
| ← Highway 125 | → Highway 129 |
Former provincial highways
| ← Highway 126 | Highway 128 → |

King's Highway 127, commonly referred to as Highway 127, is a provincially maintained highway in the Canadian province of Ontario. The route begins in Maynooth, connecting Highway 62 north of Bancroft with Highway 60 in the township of South Algonquin, east of Whitney and Algonquin Provincial Park. The entire route is patrolled by the Ontario Provincial Police (OPP).

Highway 127 was designated in late 1955, generally following the same route as today, with the exception of the northern terminus. During the early 1960s, a new road was constructed east of Whitney, bypassing the old highway for several kilometres. By 1963, the bypass was complete and Highway 127 was rerouted onto it.

== Route description ==
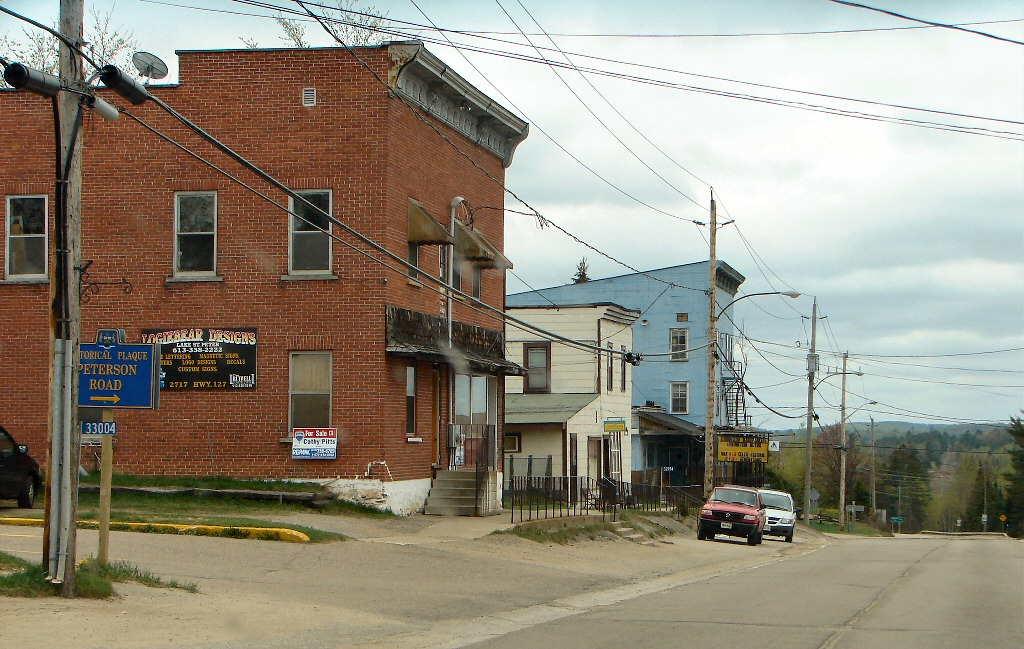
Highway 127 through Maynooth

Highway 127 is a remote connector highway that lies east of Algonquin Park, the oldest provincial park in Ontario and one of the most frequented camping grounds in the world. It connects the northern end of Highway 62 in Maynooth with Highway 60 east of Whitney. The only community Highway 127 passes through is Lake St. Peter. It passes through large swaths of undeveloped forest on its 39 km (24 mi) journey, and is rather remote; aside from the towns at the northern and southern terminuses, the only named community on Highway 127 is Lake St. Peter.

Like most routes which pass through the Canadian Shield, Highway 127 travels through rock cuts and muskeg-ridden terrain in the midst of dense coniferous forests. There is little agricultural activity along the route. Within Maynooth, Highway 127 serves nearly three times as many vehicles as the rest of the route; while a daily average of 1800 vehicles use Highway 127 in Maynooth, only 650 travel the length of the route. As with other provincial highways in Ontario, Highway 127 is patrolled by the OPP.

== History ==
Highway 127 was first designated in 1955 along an existing road between Maynooth and Whitney. The section within the Hastings County was designated on October 19 and the section within Nipissing District on November 16. The highway was 44.3 km (27.5 mi) long when it was designated. It was paved as far north as Lake St. Peter, after which it was a gravel road. Over the next several years, the highway was paved north towards Whitney. In the early 1960s, it was decided to bypass to the east of the northernmost section of the highway. Construction began in 1961 and was completed by 1963, cutting 5 km (3.1 mi) off the length of the route. Aside from minor realignments, the route of Highway 127 has not changed since then.

== Major intersections ==
The following table lists the major junctions along Highway 127, as noted by the Ministry of Transportation of Ontario.

| Division | Location | km | mi | Destinations | Notes |
|---|---|---|---|---|---|
| Hastings | Hastings Highlands | 0.0 | 0.0 | Highway 62 south – Bancroft; County Road 62 east – Barry's Bay | Maynooth; meeting point of the Hastings, Madawaska and Peterson Colonization Roads |
| Hastings | Hastings Highlands | 4.5 | 2.8 | Madawaska Road | To Highway 523 |
| Nipissing | South Algonquin | 38.6 | 24.0 | Highway 60 – Huntsville, Madawaska, Barry's Bay | Whitney |
1.000 mi = 1.609 km; 1.000 km = 0.621 mi
