= Boguslaw Mosielski =

Polish-Canadian artist

- Born: Bogusław Mosielski Stanisław; 1939; Poland
- Died: 28 November 2004 (aged 65); Barry's Bay, Ontario
- Resting place: St. Hedwig's Church cemetery, Barry's Bay
- Education: University of Warsaw; University of Toronto; George Brown College
- Known for: Art jewelry, watercolor painting
- Awards: Knight's Cross of the Order of Merit of the Republic of Poland (posthumously, 2009)

Bogusław Mosielski Stanisław (1939 – 28 November 2004) was a Polish-born Canadian painter and jewellery artist. He was one of Canada's best known costume jewellers.

In 2009, he was posthumously awarded the Knight's Cross of the Order of Merit of the Republic of Poland.

== Early life and education ==
Mosielski was born in Poland in 1939 and studied architecture at the University of Warsaw from 1956 to 1964. While studying, he received private tutoring at the university's faculty of fine arts.

Mosielski married Elżbieta (Elizabeth), a gemologist, from Kashubia. The couple moved to Toronto in 1964.

In Canada, Boguslaw Mosielski studied architecture at the University of Toronto and took classes in jewellery and gemmology at George Brown College. In Toronto, he was tutored by Guttron Otte, Jack Pollock and Mary Schneider.

== Career ==
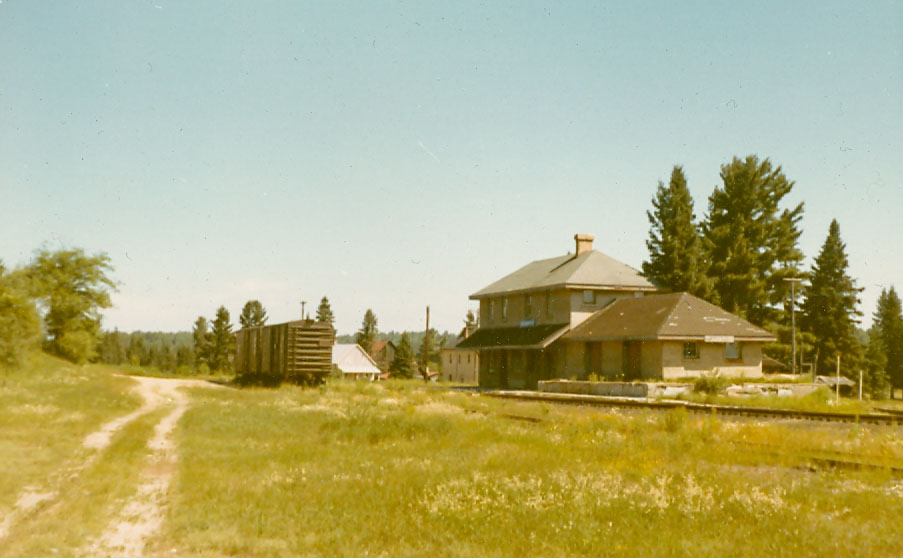
Maynooth Station, 1971

Mosielski sold unisex jewellery in Canada and Europe. In 1973, the couple opened the Silver Owl craft shop, below his boarding house at Maynooth Station. Boguslaw Mosielski favoured working repetitive forms and used glass, silver and gold. He often made custom designs for the buyers of his jewellery, and refused to work on gifts without first discussing the work with the intended recipient.

His jewellery was displayed in Ottawa at Ottawa City Hall, the Wells Gallery and the National Gallery of Canada. In 1981, he won awards in the silver and gold jewellery categories at the Canadian Jewellery Design Awards.

Around 1980, the focus of Mosielski's art shifted from jewellery to painting. An allergy to solvents forced him to abandon oil painting and focus on watercolours. He sold his paintings from his Studio BM location in Richmond, Ontario. His paintings were exhibited at the Cornwall Regional Art Gallery. Len Hooper of the Standard-Freeholder described his watercolours as having "deep intensive colours saturated with light."

Mosielski work is featured in the 2003 book The Watercolor Landscape Techniques of 23 International Artists (ISBN 978-1929834266.)

== Family life and death ==
Boguslaw Mosielski and Elizabeth had a daughter. After Toronto, the couple lived near Maynooth, before moving to Richmond near Ottawa and then Barry's Bay.

Mosielski died at the age of 65, his home in Barry's Bay on 28 November 2004. He was buried in St. Hedwig's Catholic Church cemetery in Barry's Bay.

== Legacy ==
Elizabeth donated part of Boguslaw Mosielski's estate to Nicolaus Copernicus University.

In 2006, South of 60 Arts Centre in Killaloe featured his work in the exhibit Boguslaw Mosielski: A Retrospective.

In 2009, Polish president Lech Kaczyński posthumously awarded Mosielski the Knight's Cross of the Order of Merit, recognizing his contributions to the promotion of Polish culture and art.

In 2011, Elizabeth Mosielski published a book featuring her poetry and Boguslaw Mosielski's art. The book was titled Zbliżając się do światła (English "Approaching the Light".)
