= Brudenell =

- Community
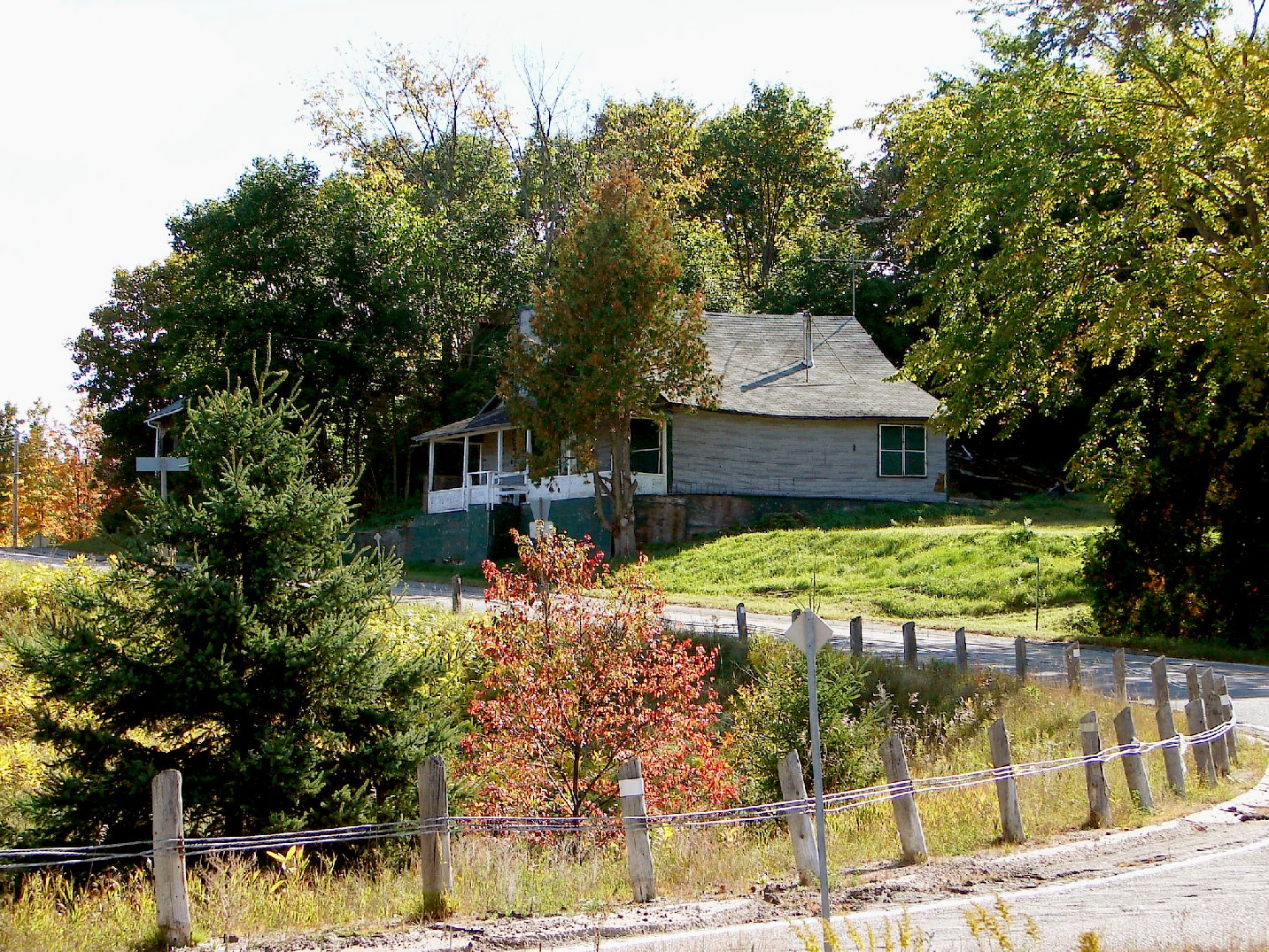

- Location in southern Ontario
- Coordinates: 45°26′41″N 77°23′48″W
- Country: Canada
- Province: Ontario
- County: Renfrew
- Established: 1850s
- Named for: James Thomas Brudenell
- Time zone: UTC−5 (EST)
  - Summer (DST): UTC−4 (EDT)
- Area codes: 613, 343

Brudenell is a community in the township of Brudenell, Lyndoch and Raglan in Renfrew County, Ontario, Canada.

== History ==
The history of Brudenell is most often presented as a "boom and bust" narrative in which the village experience a period of rapid-paced development, peaking in the 1880s, followed by a period of steep economic decline and eventual abandonment. The village is now commonly referred to as a "ghost town" though this characterization does little justice to the history of the settlement, nor to current residents, many of whom are descendants of the original settlers.

The community was established in the 1850s at the intersection of the Opeongo Line and the Addington Colonization Road with the completion of the latter road. During the 1880s, Brudenell became known as the 'sin-bucket' of the Opeongo Line due to its three hotels, offering gambling, alcohol and other vices.

In 1893, the local portion of the Canada Atlantic Railway was built, bypassing Brudenell in favour of nearby Killaloe, Ontario, as decided by then-Prime Minister Wilfrid Laurier. This led to a permanent economic decline for Brudenell.

== Today ==
Brudenell is now home to a fire station and Our Lady of the Angels Catholic Church, which hosts an annual supper to raise funds for the maintenance of parish buildings. The supper is famous for its traditional sand-baked beans.

The church hall was also for a time the home of Stone Fence Theatre, now performing mainly out of Eganville. Performances were held there from 2003 to 2006, including a rendition of "Al Capone's Hideout," a musical comedy about the notorious gangster's brief stay in the area in the 1940s. The production was directed and co-authored by Barry Goldie in association with the Upper Madawaska Theatre Group, Stone Fence Theatre's predecessor company.
