= List of Ontario colonization roads =

Historic Ontario settlement roads

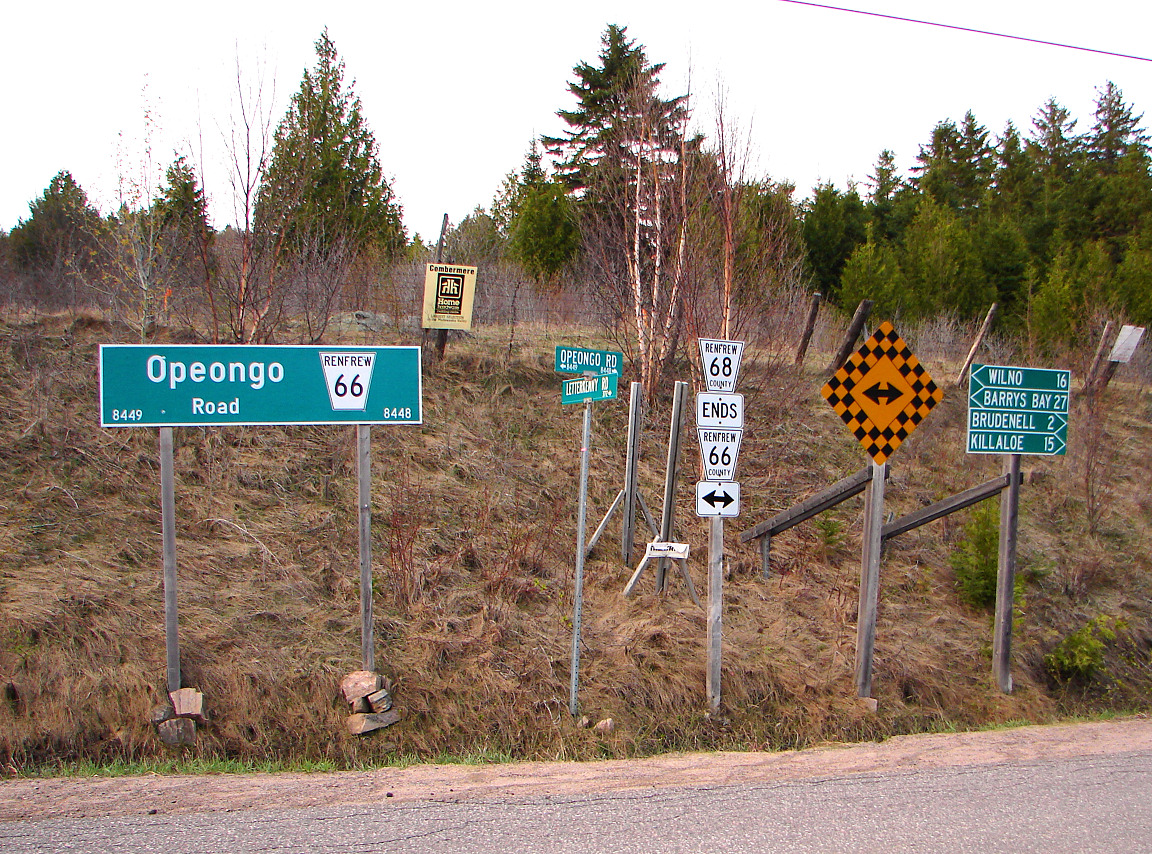
Road signs marking the Opeongo Road

The colonization roads were created during the 1840s and 1850s to open up or provide access to areas in Central and Eastern Ontario for settlement and agricultural development. The colonization roads were used by settlers to lead them toward areas for settlement, much like modern-day highways.

== History ==
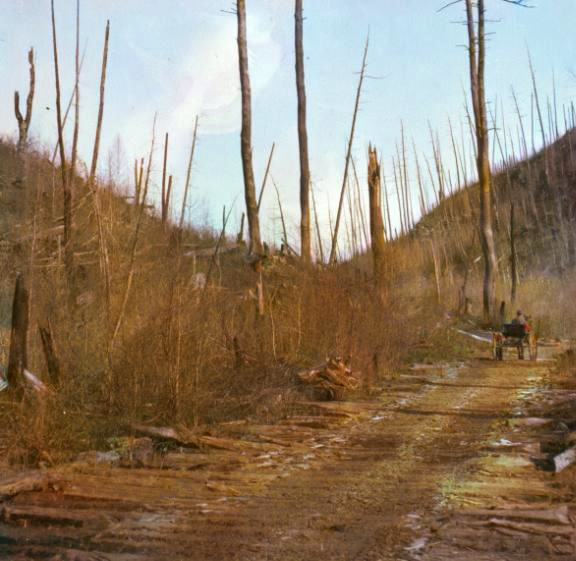
A corduroy road in 1901, winding through a stripped forest in Brudenell Township, is representative of the appearance of colonization roads in central Ontario after logging razed the forests by the early 1900s.

The colonization roads of the 1840s and 1850s were preceded by other government-sponsored road programmes going back to the period immediately after the American Revolutionary War. One early road was cut through the geographic Beverley Township from Ancaster westward toward the Grand River by two Englishmen named Ward and Smith in 1799–1800. This allowed European settlers to access the northern part of the Grand River Valley. During and after the War of 1812, government spending on roads in Upper Canada (present-day Ontario) increased significantly, leading to the improvement and extension of a number of roads. Roads into the interior were still not plentiful, however. By this time, a number of townships had been established along the northern shores of Lake Erie and Lake Ontario, which contained generally fertile land composed of glacial till and clay-rich loam; at this time, Upper Canada was "essentially one long, thin strip of settlement" along these shores, according to historian Andrew Burghardt. As these townships filled up, development pressure increased toward the interior, but the colonial government struggled to maintain Upper Canada's principal roads and bridges. The government pursued private toll roads, empowering corporations to borrow money to finance roadway improvements, which would then theoretically be paid for from toll income. London, which during the 1820s and 1830s was one of the few major settlements in Upper Canada that was not situated on a lake or canal, relied heavily on road connections. Numerous road companies suffered from financial problems; Burghardt notes that "[i]t is clear that before the advent of the railway it was difficult to supply adequate means of land transportation at a bearable cost."

By this time, the focus of development had shifted toward Western Ontario, and new roads to the interior were laid out under the auspices of colonization companies. One of the most prominent of these was the Canada Company, which subdivided the Huron Tract into lots, and which was based inland at Guelph. It opened the western part of Upper Canada to settlement by building routes such as the Huron Road and the Toronto–Sydenham Road during the 1830s and 1840s. As these areas also filled, the government came under pressure to open up the unforgiving terrain of the Canadian Shield to settlement and sought to establish a network of east–west and north–south roads between the Ottawa Valley and Georgian Bay. This area was known as the Ottawa–Huron Tract.

In 1847, an exploration survey was carried out by Robert Bell to lay out the lines that would become the Opeongo, Hastings, and Addington Roads. The Public Lands Act, passed in 1853, permitted the granting of land to settlers who were at least 18. Those settlers who cleared at least 12 acres (4.9 ha) within four years, built a house within a year, and resided on the grant for at least five years would receive the title to that land. The government subsequently built over 1,600 kilometres (1,000 mi) of roads over the following 20 years to provide access to these grants.

However, the promises of fertile land in this new northern tract of wilderness proved false. Beneath thin layers of sparsely spread soil was solid granite. Where this granite descended deeper, valleys formed and filled with muskeg. Despite an early influx of settlers, the vast majority of grants were abandoned by the turn of the century; only 40% remained. During the first half of the 1900s, many of these colonization roads were incorporated into the growing provincial highway network. Some sections were improved to modern highway standards, while others were subsequently bypassed or abandoned. The roads that were not incorporated as highways either became local roads or were consumed by nature.

Though many other roads in the province can be considered "colonization roads", such as Yonge Street, Hurontario Street, Provincial Road (later Highway 2), Talbot Trail, and the Penetanguishene Road, they were either constructed for military purposes or by private investment.

In October 2016, the imagineNATIVE Film + Media Arts Festival premiered a documentary titled Colonization Road at the TIFF Bell Lightbox in Toronto. The documentary explores these roads within various treaty territories of Canada and the relationships which surround them. The film has toured throughout Canada, and in January 2017, the Firsthand program on CBC Television aired a broadcast version of Colonization Road.

== Description ==
The terrain these roads pass through is interlaced with many hills, lakes, forests, swamps and bedrock outcroppings. The location of many of these roads is in the Canadian Shield, among the most rugged terrain in Ontario. The soil is generally thin and unsuitable for the agricultural development that these roads were built to spur.

Most of the colonization roads are not provincially maintained highways. Instead, they follow county roads and local town/township roads. A few have even been converted into hiking trails and bike trails.

== List of colonization roads ==
Below is a list of all the colonization roads.

=== Addington Road ===
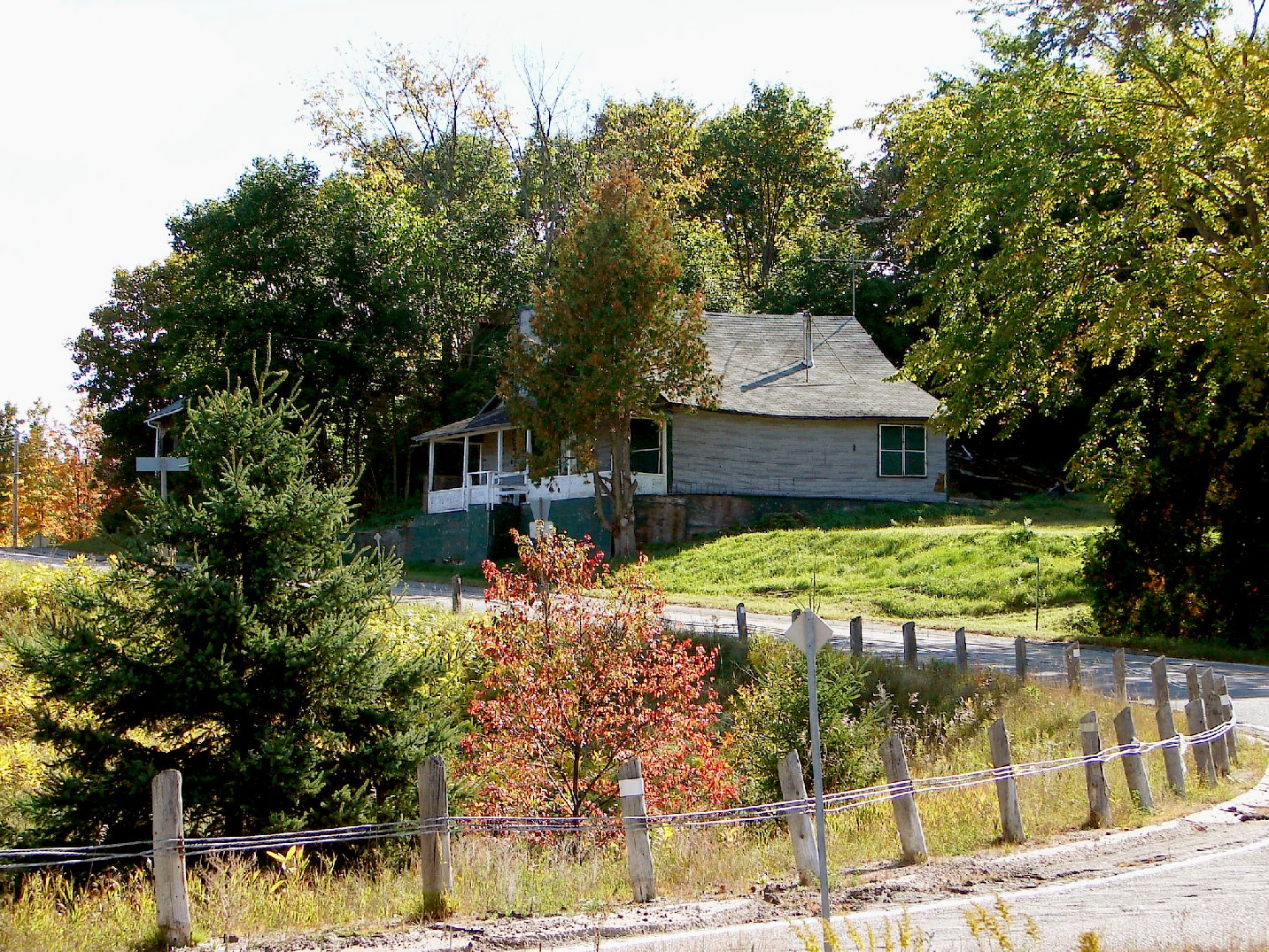
The Addington Road was surveyed as far north as the Opeongo Line in Brudenell

The Addington Road
- Location: Clareview–Brudenell
- Length: 113 km (70 mi)
- Formed: 1855–1865

The Addington Colonization Road was one of the initial routes surveyed in 1847. The contract to construct the road was awarded to A. B. Perry, who completed more than half of the length from the Clare River to the Opeongo Line by 1856. In the south, it began in the village of Clareview and travelled north to the Opeongo Line, where the village of Brudenell was established. From north of Clareview to the community of Ferguson Corners (southwest of Denbigh), Highway 41 follows the old road, though in many places bypasses have been constructed and the old road named the Addington Road followed by a number from one to eight. North of Ferguson Corners, the old road has been overtaken by the forest, though short spurs are evident west of Denbigh and north and south of Quadeville.

=== Bobcaygeon Road ===
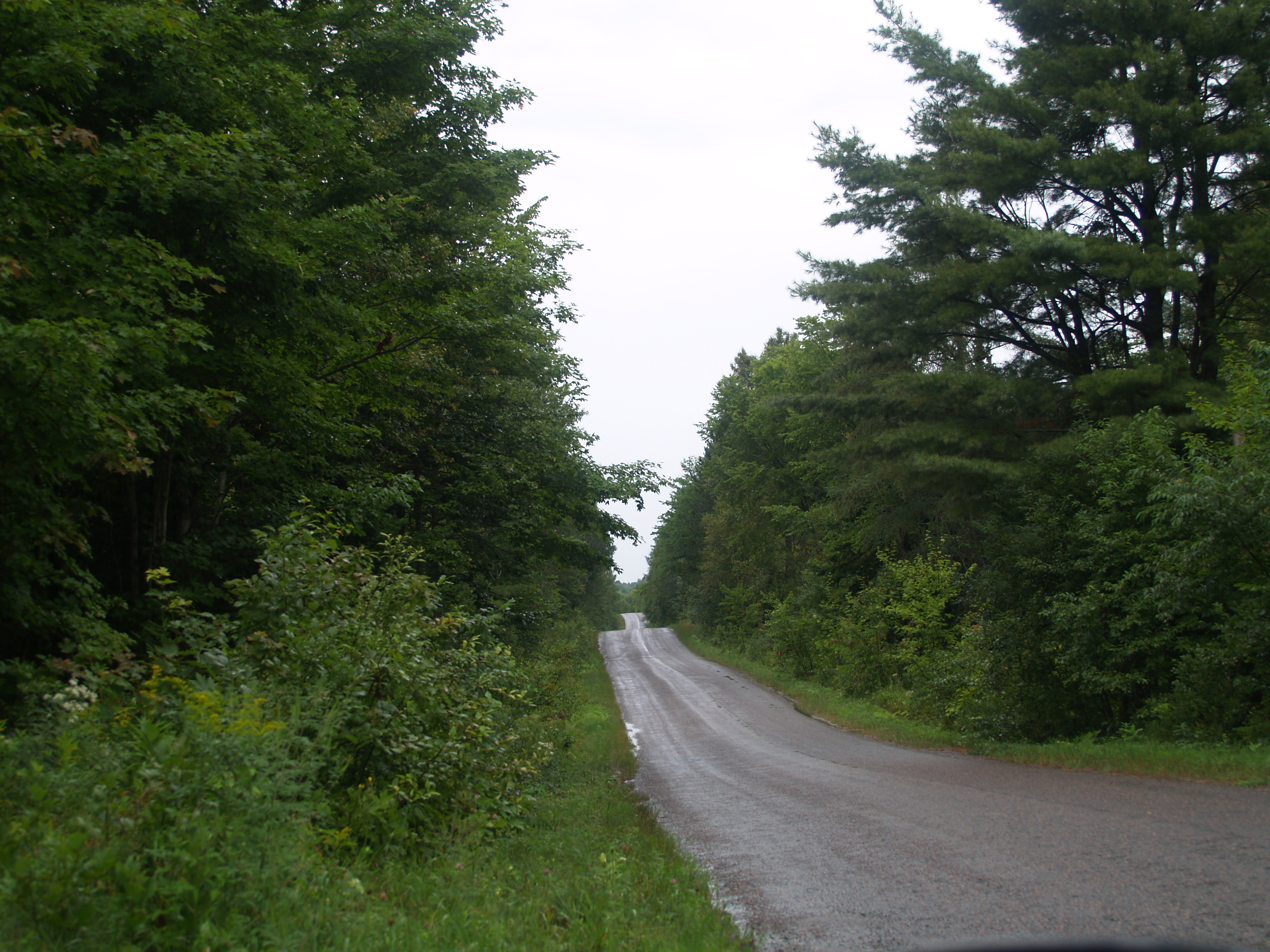
The Bobcaygeon Road near the old Peterson Road, west of Carnarvon

The Bobcaygeon Road
- Location: Bobcaygeon–Dorset
- Length: 89 km (55 mi)
- Formed: 1856–1863

The Bobcaygeon Colonization Road opened up the northern half of Peterborough and Victoria counties and much of Haliburton County. The road begins in the village of Bobcaygeon and travels north through Minden, ending north of the Peterson Road (Highway 118). The old road was surveyed as far north as the Oxtongue River but never continued beyond that. It now forms the boundary between Minden Hills and Algonquin Highlands and the boundary between Muskoka and Haliburton further north. The former Highway 649 and Highway 121 were eventually routed the majority of the southern half of this road. From Minden north to Highway 118, the road is a paved township road. Between Ox Narrows and Dorset, Highway 35 generally follows the original survey line.

=== Buckhorn Road ===
The Buckhorn Road
- Location: Buckhorn–Gooderham
- Length: 48 km (30 mi)
- Formed: 1855–1865

The Buckhorn Road begins just north of Peterborough at Lakefield Road. From Peterborough to the town of Buckhorn, the Buckhorn Road is referred to as Peterborough County Road 23 and is still labelled as the Buckhorn Road at many intersections. North of Buckhorn, the road is listed as Peterborough County Road 36 until Flynn's Turn. From there, Peterborough County Road 507 is renamed the Buckhorn Road until it reaches the town of Gooderham. Slightly west of Gooderham, the old colonization road continues via Haliburton County Road 3, also known as Glamorgan Road, until it reaches Highway 118 just outside Haliburton.

=== Burleigh Road ===
The Burleigh Road
- Location: Burleigh Falls–The Peterson Road
- Length: 32 km (20 mi)
- Formed: 1850s

The old Burleigh Road began in Burleigh Falls and continued north along Ontario Highway 28. Along the way, Burleigh Street in the town of Apsley echoes the name of the colonization road. In Haliburton County, the route turned northwest at Kidd's Corners and followed Dyno Road (Haliburton County Road 48) past the Dyno Mine site. At the town of Cheddar, the road briefly jogged west following Highway 118 to the former community of Cope Falls. The Burleigh Road then turned north, following present-day Loop Road (Haliburton County Road 648) to Wilberforce. Here, Burleigh Road still exists as Haliburton County Road 15, running roughly north on the eastern side of Clement Lake and the western side of Grace Lake until it meets the Kennaway Road. Part of this stretch is now a recreational trail. The remainder of the northbound tract is an unpaved road running to Fourcorner Lake, where the intersection of the Burleigh and Peterson roads was located.

=== Cameron Road ===
The Cameron Road
- Location: Rosedale–Minden
- Formed: 1850s

The Cameron Road ran north from Rosedale to Minden and is now the route of Highway 35.

=== Frontenac Road ===
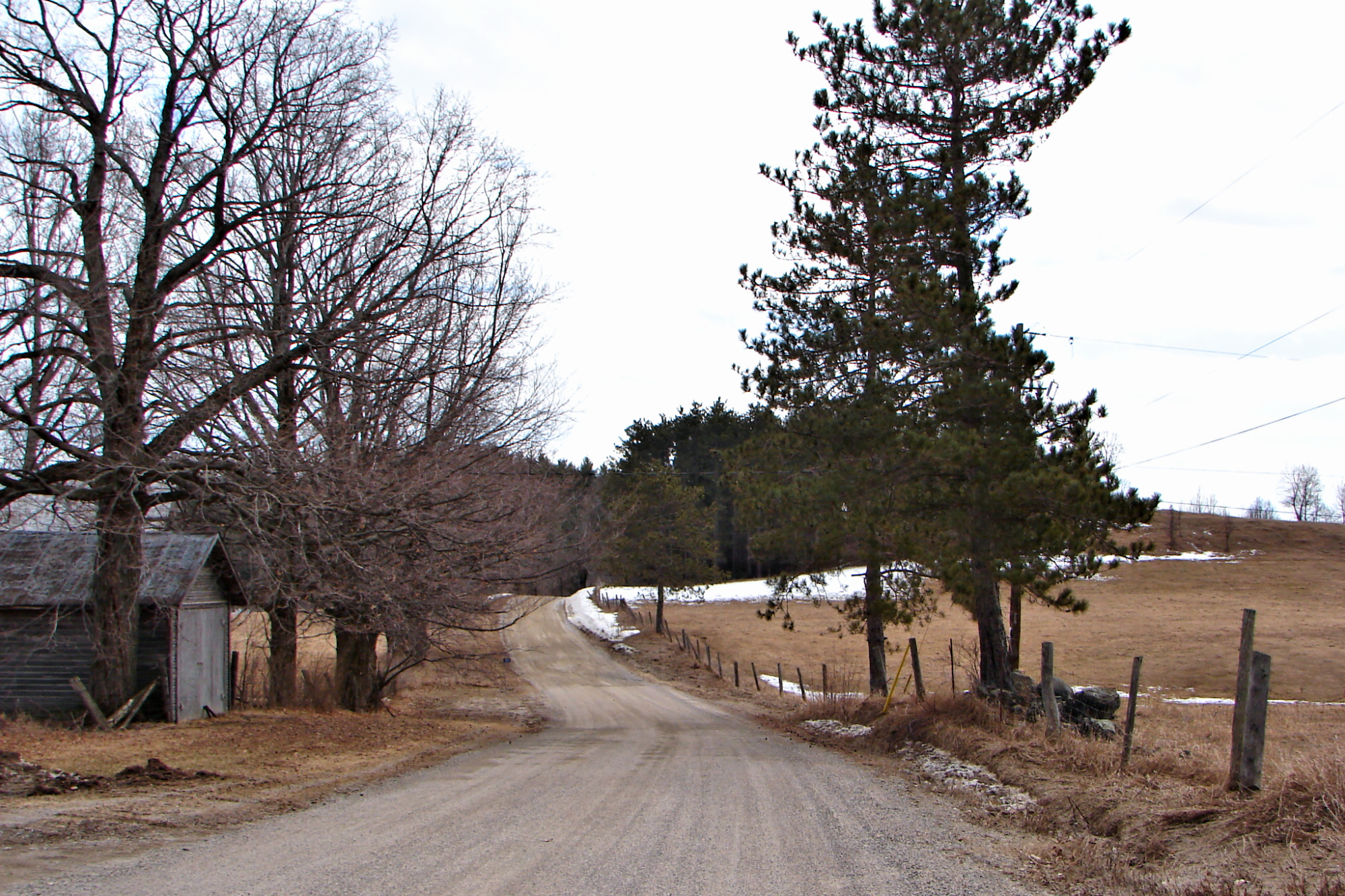
Frontenac Road near Mountain Grove

The Frontenac Road
- Location: Kingston – Matawatchan
- Length: 66 km (41 mi)
- Formed: 1852–1862

The Frontenac Road travelled north from Kingston to the Madawaska River at Matawatchan.

The road was first surveyed in 1852 and 1853 by Provincial Land Surveyor Thomas Fraser Gibbs. Warren Godfrey (for whom a town along the road is named) oversaw construction, completing the road as far north as the Mississippi Road at Plevna via Parham, Mountain Grove and Ardoch. This task was finished by 1862. An extension northwest to the Madawaska River at Matawatchan was completed by 1869. However, much of this section has been lost to the forest.

=== Garafraxa Road ===
The Garafraxa Road
- Location: Guelph – Owen Sound
- Formed: 1837–1848

The Garafraxa Road was built to extend Brock Road north from Guelph to the new settlement of Sydenham, renamed Owen Sound in 1851, on Georgian Bay. An Order in Council was passed that called for the building of this road on April 13, 1837. Deputy Surveyor Charles Rankin was allowed to lay a line between Oakville and Sydenham. Rankin surveyed the line north of Arthur before the 1837 Upper Canada Rebellion broke out in Toronto. In 1839, John McDonald was hired to resurvey the line. He completed the survey between Guelph and Fergus that year, and to Arthur by October 1842. Construction of the line between Arthur and Sydenham began at both ends in 1843. The entire route was navigable by 1848. By 1861, the majority had been gravelled, and tollgates were briefly established between Fergus and Owen Sound. The entire route became part of Highway 6 in 1920.

=== Great North Road ===
The Great North Road
- Location: Parry Sound – Commanda
- Length: 97 km (60 mi)
- Formed: 1867–1871

The Great North Road connected Parry Sound Road in Parry Sound with the Nipissing Road in Commanda. Today, Highway 124 largely follows the old road.

=== Hastings Road ===
The Hastings Road
- Location: Madoc – Whitney
- Length: 113 km (70 mi)
- Formed: 1854–1858

The Hastings Road was surveyed and built to the northern boundary of Hastings county, north of the hamlet of Lake St. Peter. It was continued north into the district of Nipissing as the North Road, and at one time could be driven to an intersection with the current Highway 60 between Whitney and Madawaska. It previously intersected with the Snow, Monck and Peterson roads.

=== Lavant Road ===
The Lavant Road
- Location: The Snow Road – former Ontario Highway 511

=== Mississippi Road ===
The Mississippi Road
- Location: Plevna–Bancroft
- Length: 98 km (61 mi)
- Formed: 1856–1866

The Mississippi Road began at a junction with the Frontenac Road and the Snow Road in the village of Plevna and travelled northwest, bisecting the Addington Road near Denbigh. It ended at the Hastings Road in Bancroft, where the Monck Road continued west. Today, Brule Lake Road and Buckshot Lake Road (Lennox and Addington County Road 30) follow a majority of the southwest portion of the road. Between Denbigh and Bancroft, Highway 28 travels adjacent to the old road, which has generally been overrun by trees.

=== Monck Road ===
The Monck Road
- Location: Atherley–Bancroft
- Length: 172 km (107 mi)
- Formed: 1866–1873

The Monck Road was a dual-purpose road that established colonization and military routes east from Lake Couchiching to the junction of the Hastings and Mississippi colonization roads at what is now Bancroft. In the words of the Peterborough Review, "The Monck Road is intended to traverse the entire back country from East to West, and to be adapted to military purposes." The Monck Road was surveyed through 1864 and 1865. Construction began the following year under Chief Engineer and was completed seven years later in 1873. It was named in honour of Charles Stanley Monck, who was Governor General of Canada at that time. It is one of the oldest provincial roads north of Toronto.

The Monck Road starts at Atherley and runs beside Simcoe County Road 44 (Rama Road) and Simcoe County Road 45 (Monck Road) into the City of Kawartha Lakes. It crosses Highway 35 at Norland and carries on to Kinmount, where it turns right and crosses over the Burnt River. The Monck Road then turns left up the hill and continues along Haliburton County Road 503, which runs via Furnace Falls to Tory Hill and then along Highway 118 and Highway 28 until Bancroft. From Lake Couchiching, it extends 150 kilometres east to the Hastings Road at Bancroft.

Present-day road names have been preserved along the route in Orillia, Norland, Kinmount, Cardiff and Bancroft.

=== Muskoka Road ===
The Muskoka Road
- Location: Lake Couchiching – Sundridge
- Length: 203 km (126 mi)
- Formed: 1858–1875

The Muskoka Road, most of which now forms Highway 11, was constructed in the late 1850s and early 1860s, quickly becoming the primary trunk road to Lake Nipissing. A series of towns eventually would flourish along its length, the first of which was Bracebridge. East of Muskoka Falls, Thomas J. McMurray established a 400-acre (1,600,000 m^{2}) townsite in the spring of 1861 at the intersection of the Muskoka Road and the Peterson Road.

Construction on the Muskoka Road began in 1858. At the time of Bracebridge's founding, the road did not extend beyond the Muskoka River. It was opened as far as Sundridge by 1875. Today Highway 11 follows a majority of the route but bypasses it in several locations, notably between Bracebridge and Huntsville.

=== Old Dawson Trail ===
Old Dawson Trail
- Length: 530 mi (850 km)
- Existed: 1871–present

The Old Dawson Trail is the remnant of the first all-Canadian route that linked the Great Lakes with the Canadian prairies. It was a water and land route that began at Port Arthur, Ontario (now Thunder Bay) and ended at St. Boniface, Manitoba (now Winnipeg). The land portions of the trail are usually referred to as Dawson Road.

==== Route ====
The Dawson Trail started as a road heading northwest from Port Arthur along the Shebandowan River, up to Shebandowan Lake. From there, the trail followed a series of lakes and rivers heading west, eventually ending up at the Rainy River and Lake of the Woods along the International Boundary. After crossing Lake of the Woods, the road continued for approximately 10 miles (16 kilometres) through the U.S. at Northwest Angle, overland back into Canada to Richer, Manitoba and then to its end at St. Boniface. The total distance of the trail was approximately 530 miles (850 kilometres). Travelers were required to load and unload their freight as many as 70 times throughout the journey. Segments of the Old Dawson Trail are still in use today in both provinces. Ontario Highways 102 and 11 follow Dawson Road from Thunder Bay to Shebandowan. From there, Highway 11 generally follows the original water route west to Rainy River. In Manitoba, Dawson Road formed the original course of Manitoba Highway 12 from St. Boniface to Ste. Anne. This route is now part of Provincial Road 207 between the communities of Richer and Lorette. The abandoned road between Northwest Angle and Richer has mostly fallen into disrepair, except for segments that are now part of Provincial Roads 503 and 505, accessible via the Trans-Canada Highway from the north and Provincial Road 308 from the east. Segments of Dawson Road in and around Winnipeg remain in use, but are disconnected by the Red River Floodway, the Perimeter Highway, and Lagimodiere Boulevard.

MOM's Way is a network of highways that serve as a modern day successor to Dawson Road between Winnipeg and Thunder Bay. Highways 102 and 11 in Ontario and Highway 12 south of Ste. Anne in Manitoba are part of this network. A cairn and plaque commemorating the Dawson Road was erected by the Historic Sites and Monuments Board of Canada in 1933. The landmark is located next to the local municipal office in Ste. Anne, Manitoba.

==== History ====
In 1857, the Government of Canada commissioned engineer Simon J. Dawson to survey a route from Lake Superior to the Red River Colony, thereby allowing travel from the east without having to take the existing routes through the United States. Dawson surveyed the route in 1858 and construction began in 1868. The entire trail, including the roads, was completed in 1871 and afterwards named after Dawson.

The Wolseley Expedition used the trail before the route was completed to reach the Red River Colony and quell the Red River Rebellion of 1870. This rebellion led to the establishment of the Province of Manitoba later that year. In 1873, the Dawson route was used by some 1,600 people, however, most travelers still preferred to use the much less arduous southern route through Duluth and Emerson. Much of the Dawson Trail was abandoned after the completion of the railroad between Fort William and Winnipeg in the 1880s, although local residents continued to make use of the roads.

==== Gallery ====
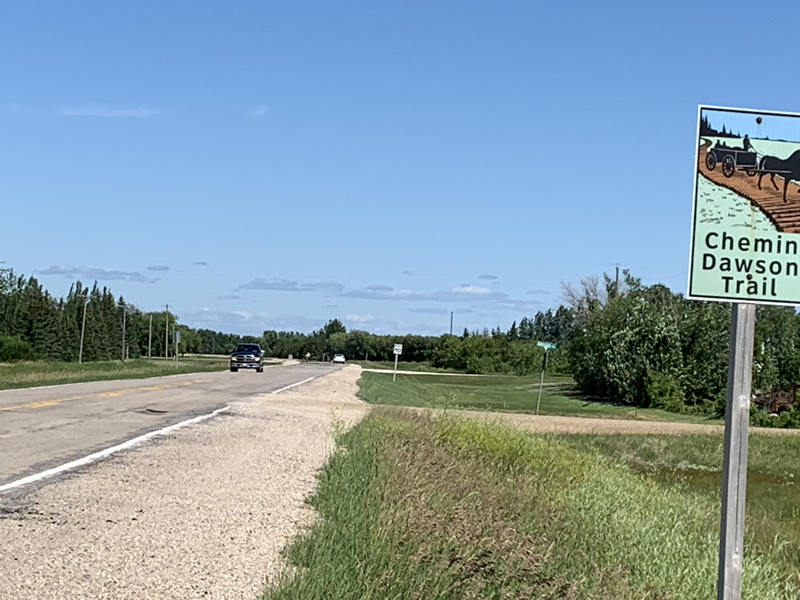
Dawson Trail marker on Provincial Road 207 in the Rural Municipality of Taché, Manitoba

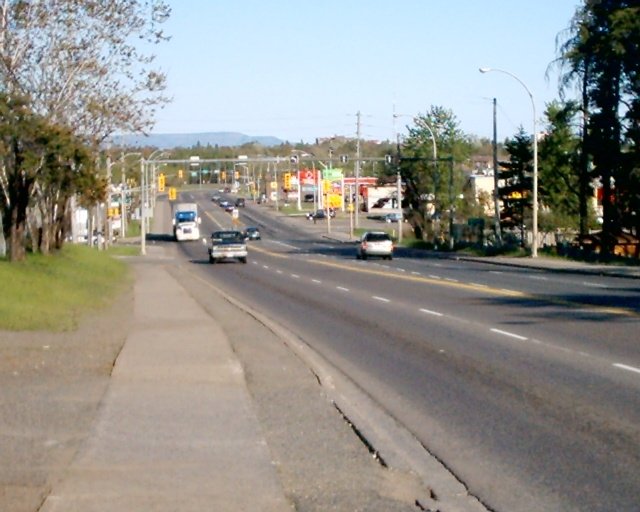
Dawson Road in Thunder Bay, Ontario (2008)

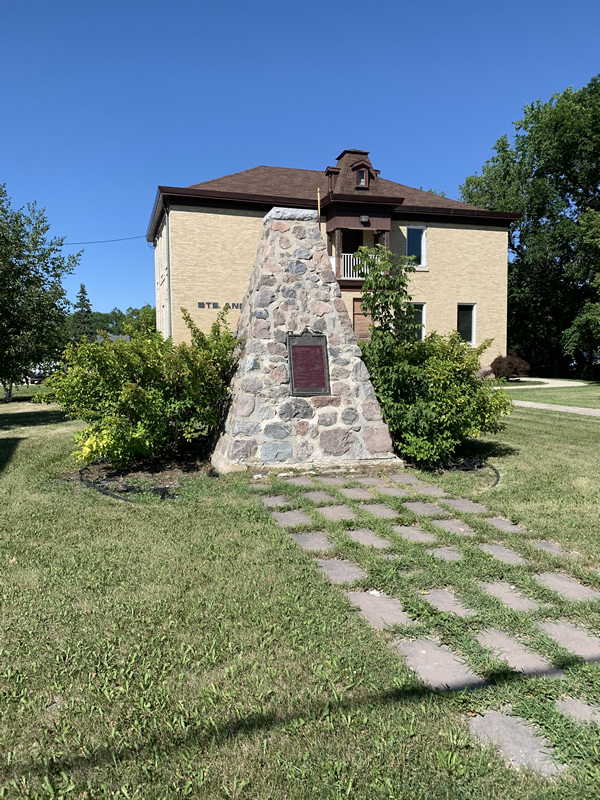
Dawson Road monument in Ste. Anne, Manitoba

Inscription on Dawson Road monument in Ste. Anne, Manitoba

=== Ottawa and Opeongo Road ===
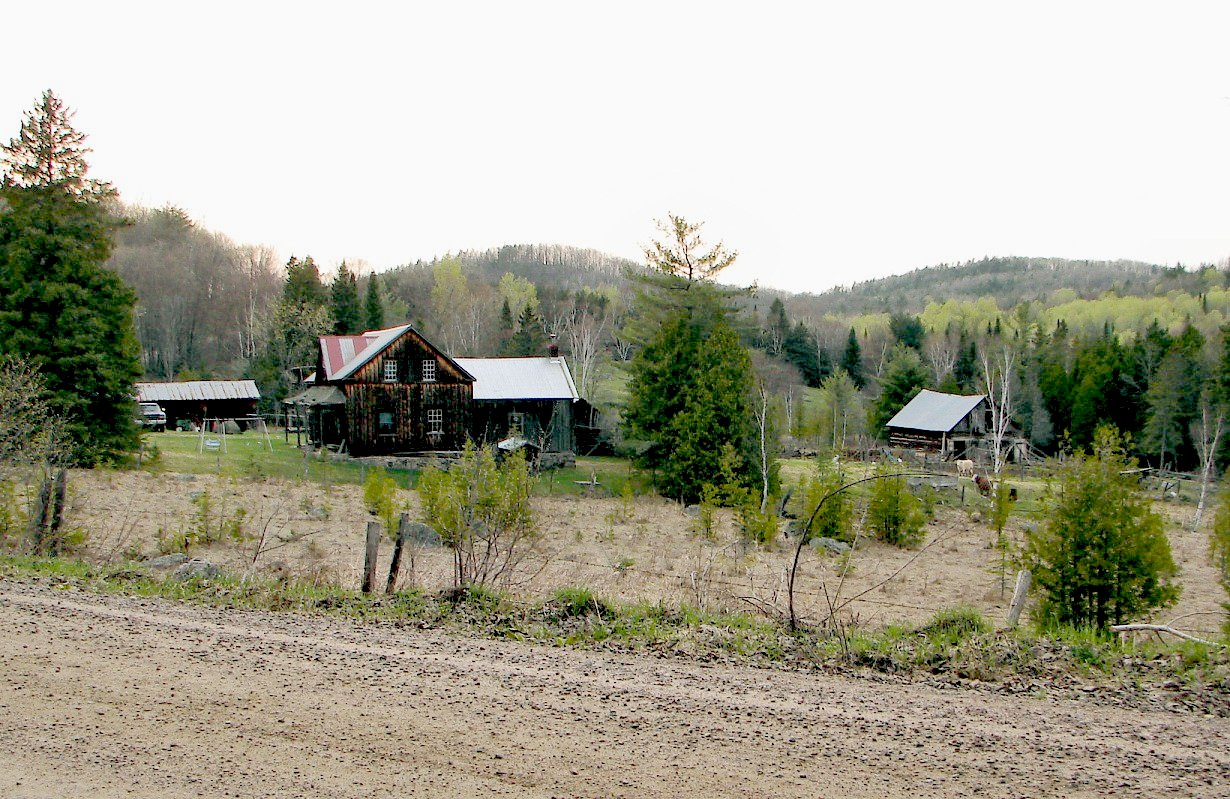
Old farm along the Opeongo Line

The Ottawa and Opeongo Road
- Location: Opeongo Lake – Renfrew
- Length: 106 km (66 mi)
- Formed: 1854–1865

The Ottawa and Opeongo Road, also known as the Opeongo Line, was one of the initial colonization roads surveyed by Hamlet Burritt and A. H. Sims under the supervision of Robert Bell in 1851–52. It was constructed westward from Renfrew beginning in 1854, reaching as far as the Hastings Road in Whitney by 1865; thereafter the survey line continued to Opeongo Lake. Today, Highway 60 follows the old road between Algonquin Park and east of Barry's Bay. At that point, the road branches out to the southeast, following portions of Renfrew County Road 66, 512 and 64. Approximately 5 kilometres (3.1 mi) west of Dacre, it encounters Highway 41. From there to Renfrew, Highway 132 follows the old road. Several songs have been written about the Opeongo Line, one of the most recent by Canadian singer-songwriter Terry McLeish. His song, "The Opeongo Line", has been included in several musicals and a tourist CD production of this historic road.

The now-abandoned settlement of Newfoundout was created as a result of the Opeongo Road and Public Land Act. Thirteen pioneer families took up occupation on the land they had been granted up a mountainside 6 kilometres (3.7 mi) off the main road. These families struggled to farm the rocky soil for thirty years, from the 1860s to the 1890s, while their settlement failed to attract institutions or other settlers. It was officially declared abandoned by 1948. More recently, the ruined log cabins have occasionally attracted photographers due to their high level of preservation.

=== Parry Sound Road ===
The Parry Sound Road
- Location: North of Bracebridge — Parry Sound
- Length: 72 km (45 mi)
- Formed: 1862—1867

The Parry Sound Road ran between Bracebridge and Parry Sound. The communities of Rosseau and Horseshoe Lake were developed along the route.

The road began 15 km north of Bracebridge on the Muskoka Road and proceeded in a northerly and later northwesterly direction.

The route follows present-day Muskoka District Road 4 (Manitoba Street, Raymond Road), Muskoka District Road 35, Highway 141, and Highway 400/Highway 69.

A portion of the old tract exists as Old Parry Sound Road east of Ullswater, Ontario.

=== Pembroke and Mattawan Road ===
The Pembroke and Mattawan Road
- Location: Pembroke–Mattawa
- Length: 158 km (98 mi)
- Formed: 1856–1866

The Pembroke and Mattawan Road was proposed by the Minister of Agriculture Allan McNab in 1852. A survey was conducted in 1853 and construction began in 1854. By 1875, the road was officially open in the summer months. The original road went through what is now Canadian Forces Base Petawawa and the Atomic Energy lands north of the town of Chalk River. It followed what is now the Balmer Bay road east of the town of Deep River. West of Deep River, the old road winds back and forth across Highway 17, which was built in the 1930s.

=== Peterson Road ===
The Peterson Road
- Location: Bracebridge – Barry's Bay
- Length: 164 km (102 mi)
- Formed: 1858–1863

The Peterson Road began at Muskoka Falls near Bracebridge and travelled east to Maynooth, where it met the Hastings Road. From Maynooth, it snaked its way northeast to Barry's Bay to meet the Opeongo Line. It was surveyed by Joseph Peterson and built between 1858 and 1863 at a cost of around $39,000. Poor soil led to little settlement in the area and some sections were already overgrown by the 1870s, but the Maynooth-Combermere section proved to be a useful logging route.

Today, the section from Bracebridge to Maynooth has mostly been consumed by the forest, though Highway 118 follows adjacent to the old road as far as Haliburton. Two small sections remain as local township roads near Carnarvon named Peterson Road and Tulip Road. The old road that runs from Haliburton to the north end of Benoir Lake, on the Elephant Lake Road is now untraceable. This part runs through the south end of Algonquin Park.

The section from Maynooth to Combermere to Barry's Bay is now the route of Highway 62.

=== Rosseau-Nipissing Road ===
The Nipissing Road
- Location: Rosseau–Nipissing
- Length: 111 km (69 mi)
- Formed: 1864–1875

The Rosseau-Nipissing Road, also called the Nipissing Road, encouraged settlement in what is now Parry Sound. The project was authorized in 1864, with surveying done from 1864 to 1865. Construction began in 1866, and the road was open by 1873. The Northern and Pacific Junction Railway built between Gravenhurst and Callander rendered the Rosseau-Nipissing road obsolete by 1886, yet much of it is still often used.

=== Snow Road ===
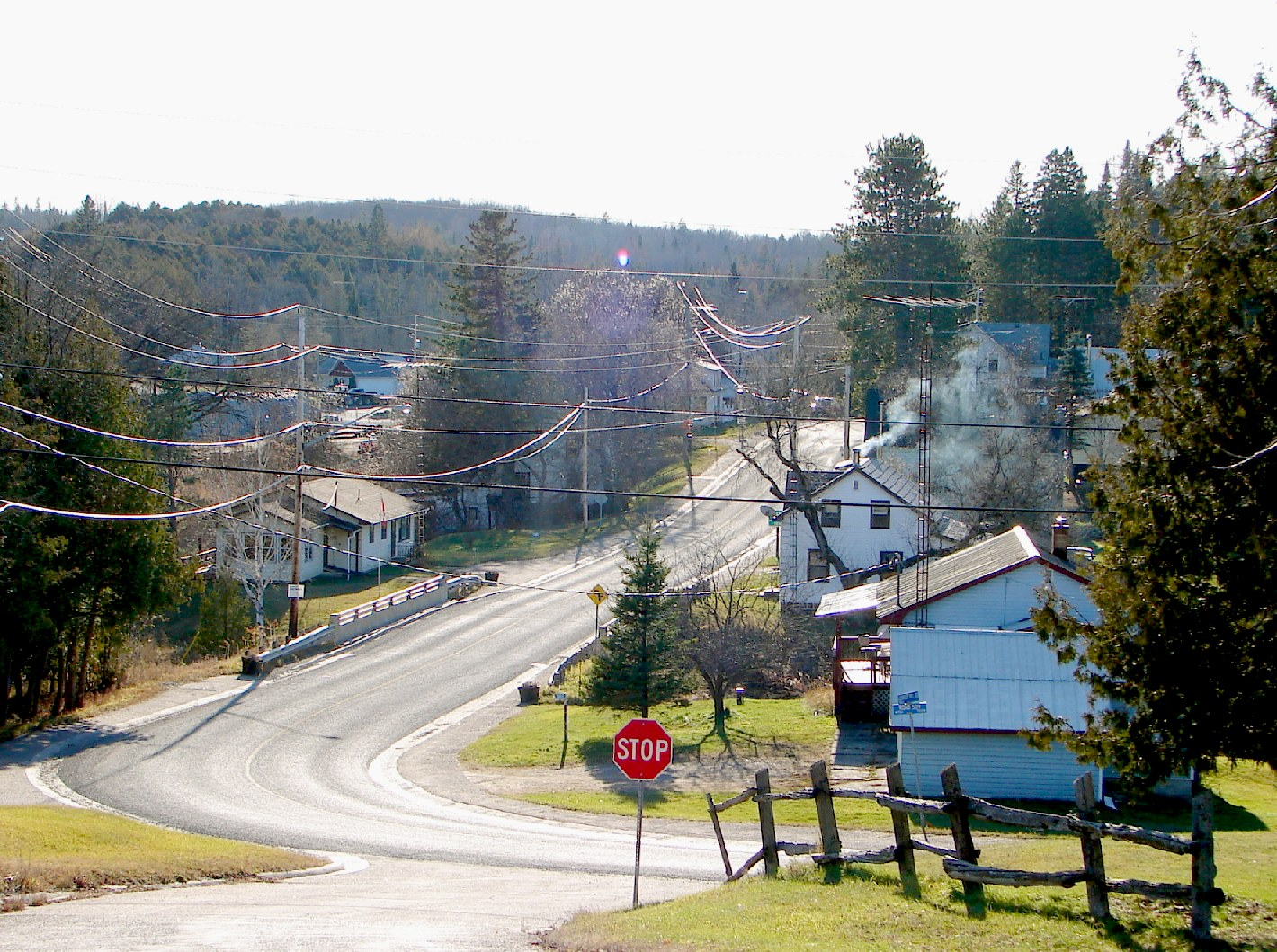
Township Road 506 in Plevna, the junction of the Mississippi, Frontenac and Snow Roads

The Snow Road
- Location: Maberly–Plevna

The Snow Road is a short, minor branch of the colonization road network that connected the northern end of the agricultural settlement in Maberly with the southeastern end of the Mississippi Road in Plevna. The Lavant Road branches off to the east at the midpoint of the road. Today, County Road 36 follows the Snow Road through Lanark County, while part of Highway 7 follows the portion lying within Frontenac County.

=== Victoria Road ===
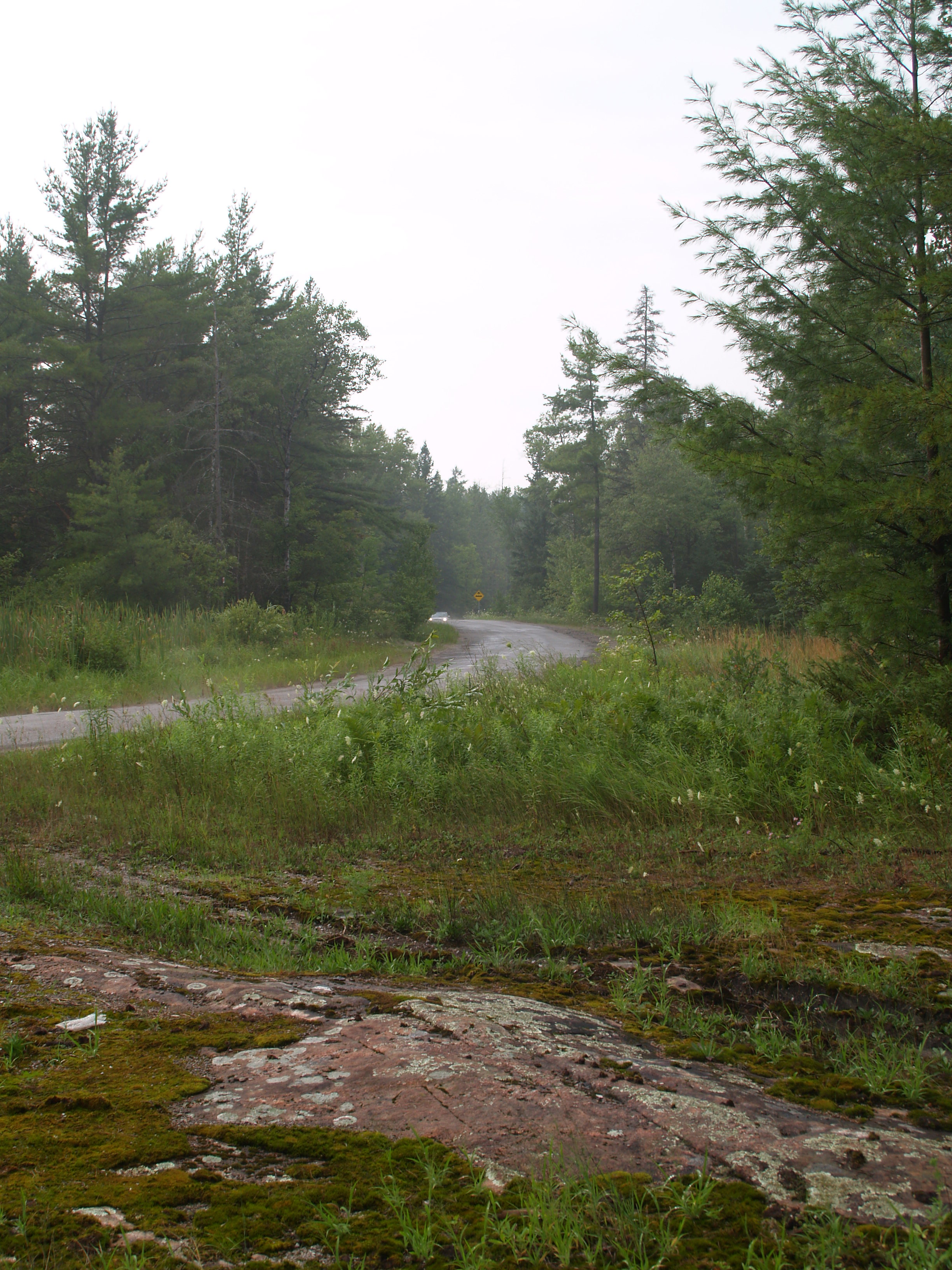
North of the Head River, Kawartha Lakes 35 enters the Canadian Shield

The Victoria Road
- Location: Glenarm–Vankoughnet

The Victoria Road continued north of its current terminus in Uphill into what is now the Queen Elizabeth II Wildlands Provincial Park. It then followed the Black River north-east to the Peterson Road in Vankoughnet; this part of the road fell into disuse in the late 1800s. Between 1956 and 1998, the portion of The Victoria Road between Highway 46 (Highway 48 after 1975) and Highway 503 was designated as Secondary Highway 505. On January 1, 1998, the entire road south of Uphill was designated as Victoria County Road 35. Victoria County was restructured as the city of Kawartha Lakes on January 1, 2001. At the same time, the Victoria Road was renamed as Kawartha Lakes Road 35.

== See also ==
- Highways in Ontario
- List of Ontario Tourist Routes
