= Maynooth, Ontario =

Maynooth
- Community
- Maynooth, 1960
- Interactive map of Maynooth
- Coordinates: 45.23°N 77.93°W
- Settled: 1861
- Founder: Michael Patrick (M.P.) Doyle
- Named for: Maynooth, County Kildare, Ireland

Government
  - Body: Hastings Highlands Township

Maynooth is a community in the Canadian province of Ontario, located in the municipality of Hastings Highlands at the intersection of Highway 62 and Highway 127, 23 km (14 miles) north of the town of Bancroft.

== Location ==
Maynooth is located at the intersection of the Peterson and Hastings Colonial Roads. Before settlement, the location was located at the crossroads of four established settlements of Monteagle, Herschel, Wicklow and McClure.

Papineau Brook passes the edge of Maynooth.

== History ==
=== Settlement (1850s - 1890s) ===
Government surveyor Joseph S. Peterson explored the area in 1856 and divided 26,200 acres into lots, identifying the area that would become Maynooth as having some of the best land due to the presence of white and red pine trees, which he identified as being valuable lumbar.

Settlers arrived from other parts of Canada and from Europe, and especially Ireland.

The first community leader was Michael Patrick (M.P.) Doyle, the son of Patrick O’Neill Doyle (born 1802) and Ann Aylward (born 1800). Both M.P. Doyles parents were born in County Carlow, Ireland and leaving Ireland during economic hard to, relocated to Puslinch, Ontario in 1831. M.P. Doyle was born in Guelph on 27 September 1837, and his father died 11 years later. In 1858, Michael Bolger of Guelph declared that he had transferred ownership of his land to M.P. Doyle. M.P. Doyle became the first postmaster in 1861, when the location was known as Doyle’s Corner and then Tara, named after the ancient Irish burial grounds at the Hill of Tara.

The Peterson Road colonisation road, named after the government survey, was built between 1858 and 1863. It connected Maynooth to the area that became Algonquin Park.

In 1862, local residents Richard (the nephew of M.P. Doyle) and Mary Aylward were hanged in Bellville for the murder of Scottish settler William Munro. William Munro was killed after an altercation with the Aylwards about killing hens that Munro accused of eating his grain. He died a week later, after refusing care from a local Indigenous doctor.

In January 1863, the town was renamed as Oxenden. Four months later it was renamed as Maynooth, named after Maynooth, Ireland.

The 114-miles Peterson Road, which was described by surveyor James William Bridgland as "a very inferior affair" was partially closed in 1870.

M.P. Doyle was the post master until 1873, then William Fitzgerald took over.

The first school in Monteagle Township, Maynooth, c 1900

By 1889, Maynooth became one of the more populous areas in the area.

=== 20th Century ===
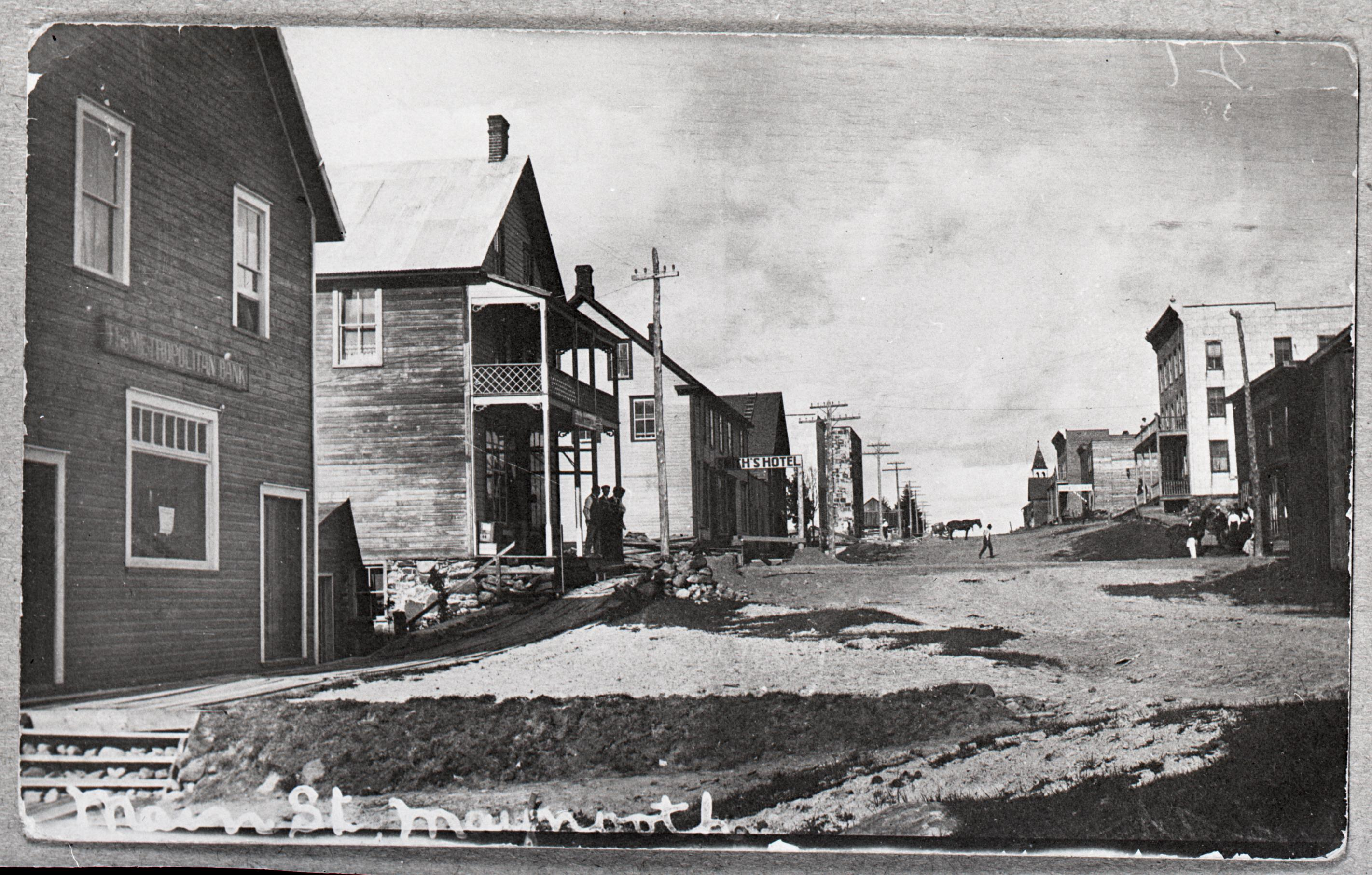
Maynooth in 1910 with Smith's hotel on the left

A fire on 27 January 1906 destroyed eight building on the north side of the main street, including Smith's Hotel (owned by Sam and Philip Green) and Wootton's Store. 200 Bulgarian residents fought the fire and prevented further damage. Doyle's hotel had a narrow escape.

A fire on starting in the barbershop and pool hall owned by Mr Flynn destroyed eight buildings on 14 July 1907 P. Rody built a hotel around 1907.

Maynooth Station, c. 1910

William Jarman, the owner of a grist mill, also operated a stage coach that connected Madoc to Bancroft and in 1907 the Central Ontario Railway was extended up from Bancroft to Maynooth.

In 1947, Maynooth had an outdoor skating rink and the village's railway station was one of the nation's largest lumber shipping points.

In 1952, Maynooth station residents reported seeing a 10-feet long "monster" while fishing at 4am in Conway's Marsh, near Palmer Rapids.

Maynooth General Store, 2026

The lumber industry attracted seasonal residents. By 1958, the village's population was 300, growing from the Uranium industry in nearby Bancroft. The Bank of Nova Scotia opened in 1959.

In 1967, parts of the Peterson Road were being reopened and turned into a snowmobile trail.

==== Back to the land movement ====
In the 1970s, it was possible to buy 100 acres of land for $5,000. During the Vietnam War, there was significant flow of American draft dodgers to the area, including to nearby intentional communities, including Dragonfly and Black Fly.

== Businesses ==
Doyle's Hotel, established in 1899, became known as the Arlington Hotel, and still operates. Notable music performers at the hotel have included Jane Bunnett.

Other businesses include Wildewood Art Gallery and the General Store, which has been operating since the early 1900s.

== Events ==
Since 1989, Maynooth has hosted the 'Maynooth Madness' festival on the Labour Day weekend which includes the loggers games featuring local talents such as log-slicing with chainsaws and skidder operating competition.

=== List of events ===
- The Christmas parade Brighten the Night (former event).
- The Southern Ontario Ice Climbing Festival (SOIceFest)
- The weekly farmers market was restarted in 2024.

== Communities ==
=== Maynooth Railway Station ===
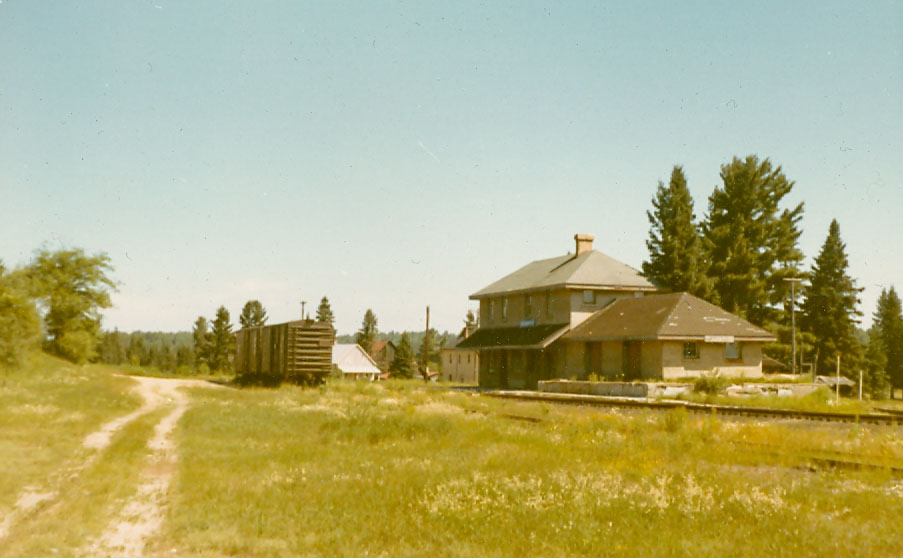
Maynooth railway Station 1971

Maynooth Station was a community located 2 kilometers east of Maynooth and about 50 meters south of Highway 62. Maynooth Station was a railway station on the Canadian National Railways, originally established in 1907 by the Central Ontario Railway to serve the Maynooth area, later acquired by Canadian Northern Railway and CNR.The section of railway was abandoned in 1984.

A few residences and a bed-and-breakfast were located around the station, but were in a state of disrepair by 2022. Residents included artists Roman Bartkiw and Boguslaw Mosielski, who operated the Silver Owl shop and studio below their boarding house.

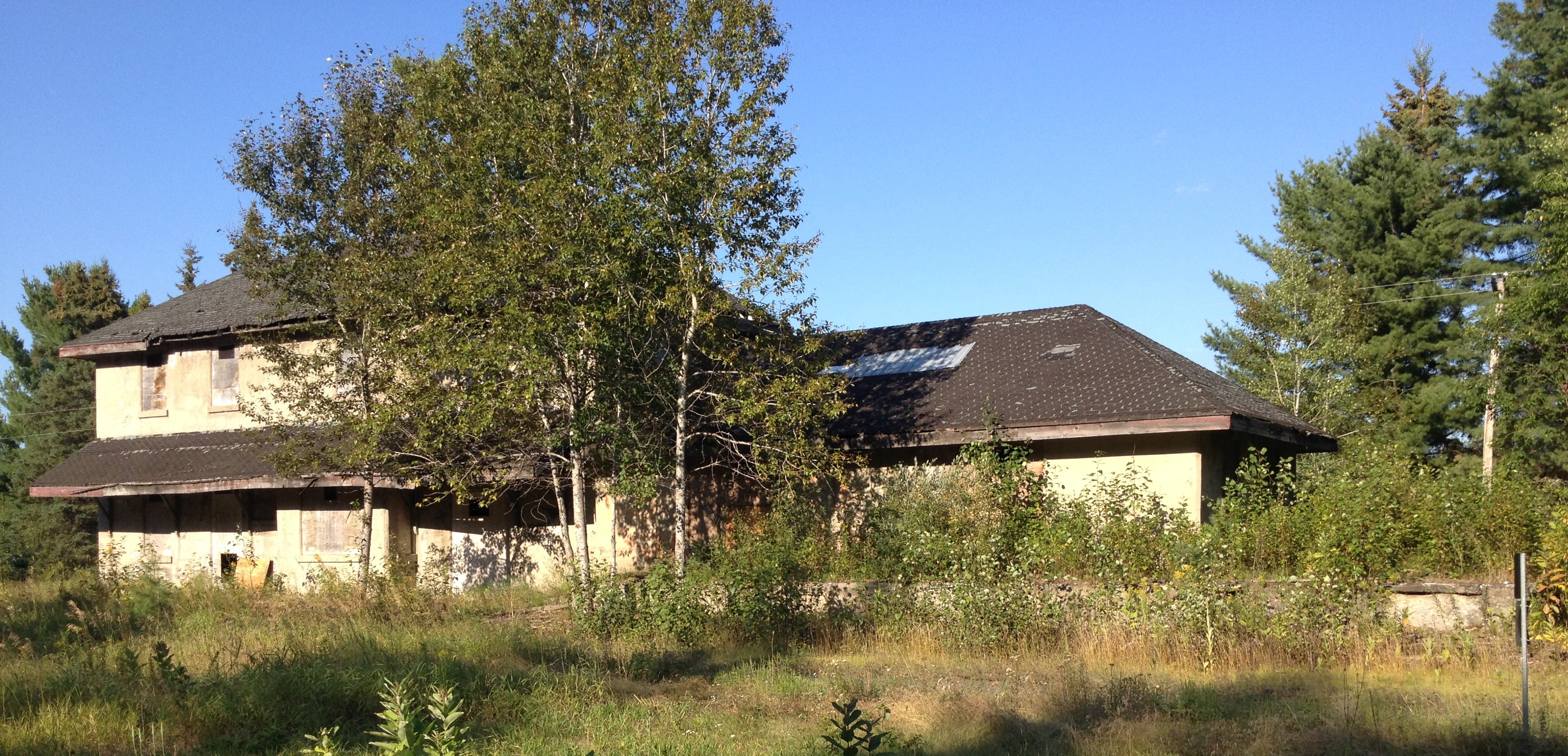
Maynooth Railway Station, 2013

In 2008, a group formed with the intent of restoring the Maynooth Station and creating an interpretive centre. The group had the support of MP Daryl Kramp, and MPP Todd Smith. Hastings County staff warned the group about liability risks at the property. In 2014, the Save the Maynooth Station group sought access to the property. In 2017, the group published a letter reporting on their efforts to learn about the planned future for the former station.

Hastings Highlands township sold their part-share of the land to Hastings County in 2022.

== Notable residents ==
- Boguslaw Mosielski
