= Hastings Highlands =

- Municipality (lower-tier)
- Municipality of Hastings Highlands
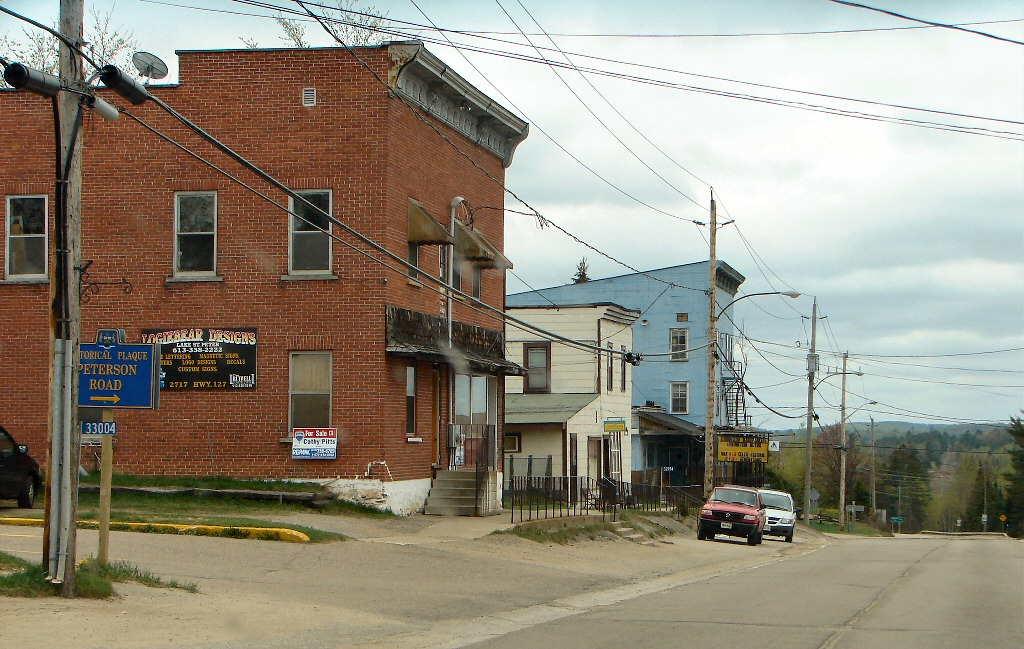
- Maynooth

- Location within Southern Ontario
- Coordinates: 45°14′N 77°56′W
- Country: Canada
- Province: Ontario
- County: Hastings
- Established: January 1, 2001

Government
  - Type: Township
  - Mayor: Tony Fitzgerald
  - Fed. riding: Hastings—Lennox and Addington—Tyendinaga
  - Prov. riding: Hastings—Lennox and Addington

Area
  - Land: 966.58 km^{2} (373.20 sq mi)

Population (2021)
  - Total: 4,385
  - Density: 4.5/km^{2} (12/sq mi)
- Time zone: UTC-5 (EST)
  - Summer (DST): UTC-4 (EDT)
- Postal code: K0L 2S0
- Area codes: 613 and 343
- Website: www.hastingshighlands.ca

Hastings Highlands is a township municipality in the Canadian province of Ontario.

Located in the northernmost portion of Hastings County, the municipality had a population of 4,385 in the 2021 Canadian census. Big Mink Lake is one of many lakes located in Hastings Highlands.

Hastings Highlands covers around 967 square kilometres between Bancroft, Ontario and Algonquin Park.

== Communities ==
The municipality's administrative and commercial centre is the community of Maynooth, located at the junction of Highway 62 and Highway 127 north of Bancroft.

The municipality also comprises the communities of Baptiste, Bell Rapids, Birds Creek, Centreview, Graphite, Greenview, Hickey Settlement, Hybla, Lake St. Peter, Maple Leaf, Maynooth Station, McAlpine Corners, McGarry Flats, Monteagle Valley, Musclow, Purdy, Scotch Bush, Scott Settlement, and York River.

=== Local community economics ===
==== Lake St. Peter ====
The community of Lake St. Peter's economy is primarily based on tourism. One of the OFSC snowmobile trails passes through the community.

==== Maynooth ====
Maynooth has one restaurant, two churches a general store and a post office.

== History ==
Mine Michael, Charles Michael, Fred Krugar and Vina Krugar the first settlers in Monteagle in 1817. Monteagle was named after William Parker, 4th Baron Monteagle. The German settlers moved to Canada after dissatisfaction with conditions in their home nation. The families cut logs, and sold eggs and butter to lumber camps.

Michael Patrick (M.P.) Doyle founded Maynooth in 1861.

The Peterson Road colonisation road, was built between 1858 and 1863. It connected Maynooth to the area that became Algonquin Park.

Maynooth Station was a railway station built in 1907 by the Central Ontario Railway to serve the Maynooth area. The railway was acquired by Canadian Northern Railway which later became part of the Canadian National Railway. There are a few residences near the station. This section of railway was abandoned in 1984. Maynooth Station was 15.83 rail miles north of Bancroft and 7.91 miles by rail, northward to Lake St. Peter, and 15.87 miles to end of track. The abandoned station is boarded up and fenced off. The track bed is now used as a hiking trail

School, Musclow Settlement, Monteagle township, 1908

Graphite was mined at the National Graphite Mine, located at Graphite, Monteagle Township from 1912 to 1919.

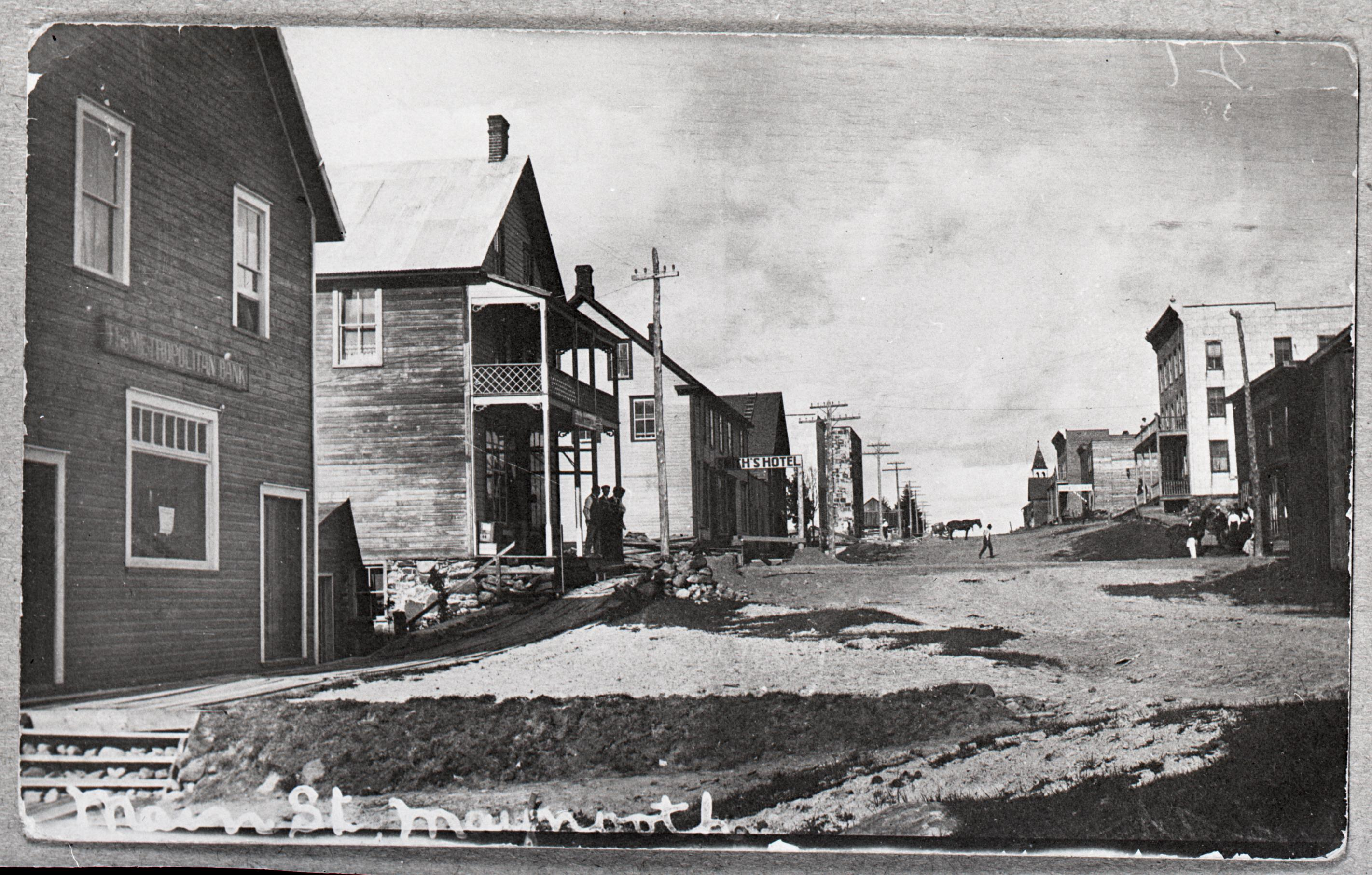
Main Street, Maynooth (c. 1910)

In the 2000s, as part of Operation Longarm, local police arrested a marijuana grower and confiscated $10m of illegal drugs.

National Graphite Mine, 1913

=== Post-2001 amalgamation political history ===
The current municipality of Hastings Highlands was incorporated on January 1, 2001, when the Township of Bangor, Wicklow and McClure, Township of Herschel, and Township of Monteagle were amalgamated.

Brent Dalgleish, the reeve of Bangor, Wicklow and McClure was Hastings Highland's first mayor.

Ron Emond was elected as Mayor in the 2006 and 2010 municipal elections. Vivian Bloom was elected as mayor in the 2014 municipal election..

Vic A. Bodnar was elected in the 2018 elections. Bodnar abruptly resigned in March 2021 and Deputy Mayor Tracy Hagar filled the acting Mayor. In May 2021, Hagar was appointed as Mayor. Tony Fitzgerald was elected in the 2022 elections and re-elected in the 2026 elections.

== Demographics ==
In the 2021 Census of Population conducted by Statistics Canada, Hastings Highlands had a population of 4,385 living in 2,007 of its 3,529 total private dwellings, a change of 7.5% from its 2016 population of 4,078. With a land area of 966.58 km^{2} (373.20 sq mi), it had a population density of 4.5/km^{2} (11.7/sq mi) in 2021.

Canada census – Hastings Highlands community profile

	2021	2016	2011
Population	4,385 (+7.5% from 2016)	4,078 (-2.2% from 2011)	4,168 (3.3% from 2006)
Land area	966.58 km^{2} (373.20 sq mi)	972.35 km^{2} (375.43 sq mi)	972.54 km^{2} (375.50 sq mi)
Population density	4.5/km^{2} (12/sq mi)	4.2/km^{2} (11/sq mi)	4.3/km^{2} (11/sq mi)
Median age	57.6 (M: 57.6, F: 57.6)	54.9 (M: 55.0, F: 54.9)
Private dwellings	3,529 (total) 2,007 (occupied)	3,684 (total)	3,522 (total)
Median household income	$69,000	$55,552

References: 2021 2016 2011

Historical census populations – Hastings Highlands
Year	Pop.	±%
1996	3,829	—
2001	3,992	+4.3%
2006	4,033	+1.0%
2011	4,168	+3.3%
2016	4,078	−2.2%
2021	4,385	+7.5%
Source: Statistics Canada

Mother tongue (2021):

- English as first language: 93.3%
- French as first language: 1.3%
- English and French as first language: 0.3%
- Other as first language: 4.6%

== Notable residents ==
- Jane Bunnett (Lake St. Peter)
- Boguslaw Mosielski, (Maynooth Railway Station)

== See also ==
- List of townships in Ontario
