= Madawaska, Ontario =

Coordinates: 45.501960°N 77.986876°W

Madawaska is an unincorporated community in Ontario, Canada. It is recognized as a designated place by Statistics Canada.

== Demographics ==
In the 2021 Census of Population conducted by Statistics Canada, Madawaska had a population of 325 living in 156 of its 284 total private dwellings, a change of -6.3% from its 2016 population of 347. With a land area of 262.96 km^{2} (101.53 sq mi), it had a population density of 1.2/km^{2} (3.2/sq mi) in 2021.

== See also ==
- List of communities in Ontario
- List of designated places in Ontario
