= Balaclava, Renfrew County, Ontario =

Balaclava
- Dispersed rural community
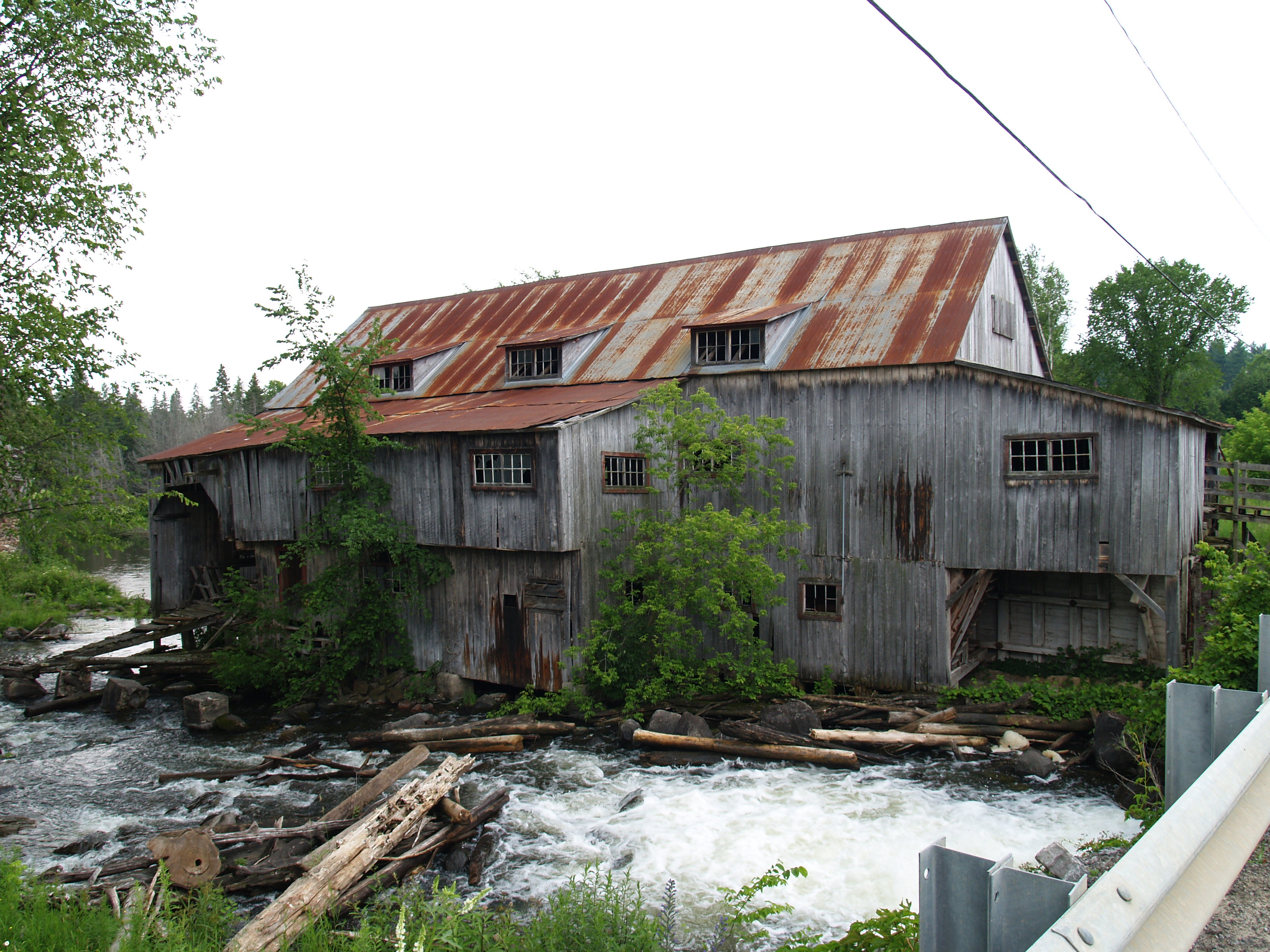
- Balaclava Mill, 2007
- Etymology: Named for the Battle of Balaclava
- Location in Southern Ontario
- Coordinates: 45°23′26″N 76°56′56″W
- Country: Canada
- Province: Ontario
- County: Renfrew
- Municipality: Bonnechere Valley
- Established: 1859
- Dissolved: 1960s
- Rebuilt: 2016
- Elevation: 196 m (643 ft)

Population (1987)
  - Total: 2
- Time zone: UTC-5 (Eastern Time Zone)
  - Summer (DST): UTC-4 (Eastern Time Zone)
- Forward Sortation Area: K0J
- Area codes: 613, 343

Balaclava is a dispersed rural community in the township municipality of Bonnechere Valley, Renfrew County, in Eastern Ontario, Canada. It is on the former Ontario Highway 513 (present day Scotch Bush Road) just off Ontario Highway 132 north of the community of Dacre, and at the outlet of Constant Creek, a tributary of the Madawaska River, from Constant Lake, approximately 30 minutes drive time from the town of Renfrew.

Balaclava known as a "ghost town" is a bustling cottage country today, a come-down from the bustling lumber town of its heyday. It started as a small community named for battle in the Crimean war. Shortly after its founding a dam and sawmill were built and by the 1860s the small hamlet had acquired a blacksmith shop and hotel to go with its permanent residents. In 1903 a sawdust burner was built so that sawdust from the mill would not be dumped in the local river, thereby polluting it. The water-powered sawmill was rebuilt in 1939 after a fire destroyed the mill that had previously occupied the space and continued to operate until 1959. At that time the depletion of available timber had reduced production to uneconomically small amounts. With the loss of the mill the viability of Balaclava as a residential town was also lost. The sawmill was the last water-powered mill to operate in the province of Ontario.

Balaclava was listed in a book on ghost towns by Ron Brown. Despite its depiction of Balaclava as a ghost town, it still maintains a population in the present-day.

== Early history ==
The place Balaclava was named in 1859 to commemorate a key victory of the British Commonwealth during the Crimean War. The Battle of Balaklava was fought on 25 October 1854 as part of the Siege of Sevastopol. and was commanded by Colonel Thomas Griffith.

In the mid-1800s, a dam was built out of timber towards the east outlet of Constant Lake along, a tributary of Madawaska River. Reports differ regarding the date of construction of the sawmill in Balaclava. The Ontario Law Reports, from 1911, indicate that the mill was erected in the year of 1855. However, an archeological assessment published in 2007, indicated the mill was constructed in 1861. Regardless, two men, named Duncan Ferguson and Donald Cameron, opened the sawmill in Balaclava, joining some of the nearly one-thousand saw mills in Upper Canada at that time. Before long, Cameron sold his portion of the mill to Ferguson. In addition to mill work, Ferguson sold goods in the area. The hamlet was rounded out with a blacksmith, two hotels and a general store, run by Joseph Lagree. As a result of the sawmill, and the timber industry in the Ottawa Valley in the 1800s, Balaclava became a rather busy settlement and bustling pioneer town. The Ottawa Valley was a natural place for a timber industry to develop. The pioneers found the land lush with coniferous trees, specifically spruce and hemlock, and red and white pine trees. European settlers were drawn to the area to cut the trees, create the square cut timber and pulp and the promises of lumber wealth.

The growing town of Balaclava attracted other businessmen, such as William Hunter who built a grist mill two kilometers downstream of the dam. Hunter built his gristmill where the gradient of Constant Creek flattens into an area of poorly drained glacial outwash.

=== Lawsuit ===
In 1868, the sawmill and dam were sold to William Richards. The Richards family would be owners and operators for the following 89 years. In 1911, a pollution-based lawsuit was brought against the sawmill, in the court of judge Latchford, Pembroke and Ottawa. This lawsuit was one of the first pollution-based lawsuits in the province of Ontario. William Hunter, plaintiff and owner of the local gristmill, complained that between 1904 and 1909, sawdust from the upstream sawmill was negatively affecting his gristmill operations, that Constant Creek was being fouled by the usage of the sawmill, that the flow of water in Constant Creek was impeded, that the defendant disposed of refuse in the creek and that, otherwise, the plaintiff suffered injury as a result. Hunter further complained that the pollution caused damage to his mill pond and that he could not properly run his gristmill, as a result. Richards, the defendant, claimed that he was within his rights based on three reasons: (1) by virtue of a grant from the Crown, (2) right of common law and (3) by easement rights under the Limitations Act.

Citing other law cases, the judge dismantled the Richards' arguments. Part of the rationale was that the original owners of Richards' mill started the operation with one saw. In 1911, the year of the suit, the mill had many saws, shingle and lath mills, an edger and other various appliances. The addition of the number of saws and other pieces of equipment enabled an obvious increase in pollution, which the court argued, surpassed Richards' rights. Further damages had already been paid from 1896 to 1903, for damages and to cover the expense of disposing of the refuse, termed "driftwood" by witnesses consulted in the case. This provided an indication of guilt. Hunter won the suit, Richards was ordered to pay $200 in retribution and was required by order of an injunction to refrain from depositing refuse into the stream. Richards' was given four months to alter his mill to address the refuse situation. This action resulted in the installation the first sawdust burner in the province of Ontario.

In 1913, an appeal was made in the Ontario Supreme Court, Appellate Division, in an attempt to overturn the verdict. It was summarily dismissed. The appellate magistrate, J.A. Meredith, seemed to side on behalf of the plaintiff in his closing remarks, indicating that sawmill operations create a "nuisance" on the plaintiff's land and the land of many other people and local waterways; causing injury. " The nuisance", he remarked " becomes more and more objectionable and injurious as the surrounding country becomes more settled and the lands affected more highly cultivated and more valuable." Regarding Richard's claim that the Crown grant from 1855 permitted his polluting of the stream, the court commented justice could not be retroactive. In other words, the needs of the early settlers were markedly different than the needs of society in 1913. Therefore, the land grant of 1855 could not also apply as if the case were being tried in an earlier time, as Richards' had requested. The court indicated that privileges were actively being withdrawn and "'trespassing is forbidden'" is becoming the rule rather than the exception." The appeal was dismissed "with costs".

And in an ironic twist of fate, in 1915, it was reported in the Contract Record and Engineering Review that Harry Richards' mill had been destroyed by fire and that he had plans to rebuild the mill.

=== Concrete Dam ===
In 1927, the dam, known as the Balaclava Dam, was rebuilt, this time out of concrete. The dam served both the lumbering and sawmill industries. The concrete dam measured 2.5m high by 53m long.

== Present day ==
Balaclava is now considered an abandoned or ghost town of Ontario. What remains is "a few houses, an abandoned general store and blacksmith shop, an old dam over which the main road passes and a marvelously intact 19th century sawmill".

In 1983, the Balaclava Dam was purchased by the Ministry of Government Services due to concerns raised about low lake levels and poor dam operations. The dam supported a bridge on Scotch Bush Road which therefore involved the County of Renfrew. In 2012 and 2013, modifications were made to the dam and bridge structure to separate the two. Cost for the project was shared between the Ministry of Natural Resources and the County of Renfrew. This project was undertaken because the aging nature of the structure of the dam. The freeze and thaw cycles could no longer be contained within the 90-year-old concrete. Concerns about the dam's ability to control floods were cited by the Ministry of Natural Resources (MNR), owner of the Balaclava Dam, and owner of over 300 other dams in the province of Ontario. Further, the MNR cited it needed to be in compliance with requirements of subsection 35(2) of the Fisheries Act. This involved decommissioning Balaclava dam and the roadway above it, removing old structures, building a new and larger dam which was accomplished in 2013. The Richards Family operated the Sawmill and owned the surrounding area until 1957. At that time ownership changed hands to Mr. David Dick & Mrs. Beulah Dick (Walsh). The sawmill continued to operate on water power until 1967. Mr and Mrs Dick owned and operated the general store until the 1970s. Presently, the remnants of the general store have been preserved and restored into a Cottage. Over the years Mr. Dick severed and sold off lots of property; leading to the development of many modern cottages and homes built along Constant lake.

Next to the original location of the dam are two heritage structures that "represent early 20th century architecture and economy". One of which is the sawmill, located on the west bank of Constant Creek. The other is a red framed building that fronts the mill pond on the east side of the creek.
