= Ontario Highway 513 =

Former Ontario provincial highway

Highway 513

Route information
- Maintained by the Ministry of Transportation and Communications
- Length: 15.8 km (9.8 mi)
- Existed: 1956–c. 1999

Major junctions
- South end: Highway 132 (Dacre, Ontario)
- North end: Southwest of Douglas, Ontario

Location
- Country: Canada
- Province: Ontario

Highway system
- Ontario provincial highways; Current; Former; 400-series
← Highway 512	→ Highway 514

Secondary Highway 513, commonly referred to as Highway 513, was a provincially maintained secondary highway in the Canadian province of Ontario. Located within Renfrew County, the highway travelled northward from Highway 132 at Dacre along Scotch Bush Road, turning eastward on what is now Renfrew County Road 22 (Hyndford Road), and ending a short distance to the east before reaching Douglas.

Highway 513 was established, along with many other secondary highways, in 1956. Although it originally extended along Scotch Bush Road, it was extended a short distance east along Hyndford Road c. 1963. By the late 1990s, Highway 513 had been downloaded to local authority and has since been known as Scotch Bush Road.

== Route description ==
The former routing of Highway 513 is today known as Scotch Bush Road and Hyndford Road. It travelled northeast from the middle of Dacre, meandering alongside Constant Creek until it crossed it at the hamlet of Balaclava. The route continued wandering north to the east of Constant Lake, eventually straightening out at Watson Road before encountering the hamlet of Scotch Bush. It continued straight until reaching what is now Renfrew County Road 22 (Hyndford Road) at the hamlet of Hyndford. There, the designation turned east onto that road and followed it for several kilometres, ending inconspicuously at the boundary of the former townships of Gratton and Admaston, a few kilometres southwest of Douglas. Although houses dot the former highway throughout its present length, the majority of the surroundings comprise thick forests south of Scotch Bank, and pastures north of there. Geographically, the route was within the Ottawa-Bonnechere Graben, and is situated just south of the Bonnechere River.

== History ==
The route of Highway 513 was first assumed by the Department of Highways in early 1956, along with several dozen other secondary highways. The route travelled north from Highway 132 at Dacre, and ended at what is now Renfrew County Road 22 (Hyndford Road) several kilometres west of Douglas. It was extended slightly eastward from this northern terminus, c. 1963. The route now ended at the Gratton–Admaston Township boundary, and remained like this until the 1990s. Although Highway 513 wasn't downloaded as part of the mass highway transfers performed in 1997 and 1998, the route was no longer part of the provincial highway network by 1999. It is now known simply as Scotch Bush Line between Dacre and Hyndford, while the segment along Hyndford Road now forms a portion of Renfrew County Road 22.

== Major intersections ==
The following table lists the major junctions along Highway 513, as noted by the Ontario Department of Highways. The entire route was located in Renfrew County.

Location	km	mi	Destinations	Notes
Dacre	0.0	0.0	Highway 132 – Renfrew	
Hyndford	13.6	8.5	County Road 22 (Hyndford Road) – Douglas	Highway 513 turned east onto Hyndford Road at this intersection
Hyndford	15.8	9.8		Former Gratton–Admaston Township boundary
1.000 mi = 1.609 km; 1.000 km = 0.621 mi
