= Scotch Bush, Ontario =

Scotch Bush may refer to:

- Scotch Bush, Hastings County, Ontario
- Scotch Bush, Renfrew County, Ontario
