= Bishop Smith Catholic High School =

Location
- Pembroke, Ontario; Canada
- Coordinates: 45.8176°N 77.1202°W

Information
- School type: Catholic High school
- Religious affiliation: Catholic
- Established: 1982
- School board: Renfrew County Catholic District School Board
- Principal: Julie Huckabone
- Grades: 7-12
- Enrollment: 860
- Language: English
- Website: www.rccdsb.edu.on.ca/bsch/

Bishop Smith Catholic High School is the largest school within the Renfrew County Catholic District School Board. It is located in Pembroke, Ontario.

== History ==
Bishop Smith Catholic High School was founded in 1982. Originally, it was located at 390 Bell Street, but was moved to 362 Carmody Street in the summer of 1992. It has had 7 principals, with the incumbent Principal Mrs. Julie Huckabone having taken office in 2021.

Bishop Smith is one of two catholic high schools in Renfrew County, with the other being St. Joseph's High School in Renfrew, Ontario.

List of Administrators 1982 - present
No.	Portrait	Name	Took office	Left office	Vice-Principal	Notes
1.		Robert Tate	1982	1998	Unknown	Namesake of the school's Robert Tate Library
2.		Jim Fogarty	1998	2001	Unknown	
3.		Peter Adam	2001	2011	Brennan Trainor (2001 - 2007)	
4.		Mark Searson	2011	2013	Derek Lennox (2012 - 2016)	
5.		Clint Young	2013	2019	Derek Lennox (2012 - 2016); Julie Huckabone (2014 - 2017); Sally Douglas (2017 - 2019)	
6.		Brennan Trainor	2019	2021	Chris Mulvihill; Erik Lemke	
7.		Julie Huckabone	2021		Past: Katie Scott (to 2024); Chris Mulvihill (to 2024); Julie Shreenan (2024-2025); Lauren Oattes (2024-2025); Present: Liam Young (2026 - present); Chris Silsmer (2025 - present); Sean Forndran (2025 - present)	Young is vice-principal for elementary students. Silmser and Forndran are for high school

== See also ==
- Education in Ontario
- List of secondary schools in Ontario
