= Ontario Highway 132 =

Ontario provincial highway

Highway 132
- Highway 132 highlighted in red

Route information
- Maintained by the Ministry of Transportation of Ontario
- Length: 30.3 km (18.8 mi)
- Existed: January 11, 1956–present

Major junctions
- West end: Highway 41 near Dacre
- East end: Highway 60 in Renfrew

Location
- Country: Canada
- Province: Ontario

Highway system
- Ontario provincial highways; Current; Former; 400-series
← Highway 130	→ Highway 137
Former provincial highways
← Highway 131	Highway 133 →

King's Highway 132, commonly referred to as Highway 132, is a provincially maintained highway the Canadian province of Ontario. Its western terminus is at Highway 41 near Dacre while its eastern terminus is at Highway 60 in Renfrew. The length of Highway 132 is 30.3 km (18.8 mi), situated entirely in Renfrew County. It travels through the communities of Shamrock, Dacre and Renfrew.

The highway was built in the 1850s as part of the Opeongo and Ottawa Colonization Road, providing access to Renfrew County for settlement in the Opeongo Hills. However, it did not become a provincial highway until 1956. Aside from the change in number of the highways at either end of the route, the route has remained the same since then.

== Route description ==
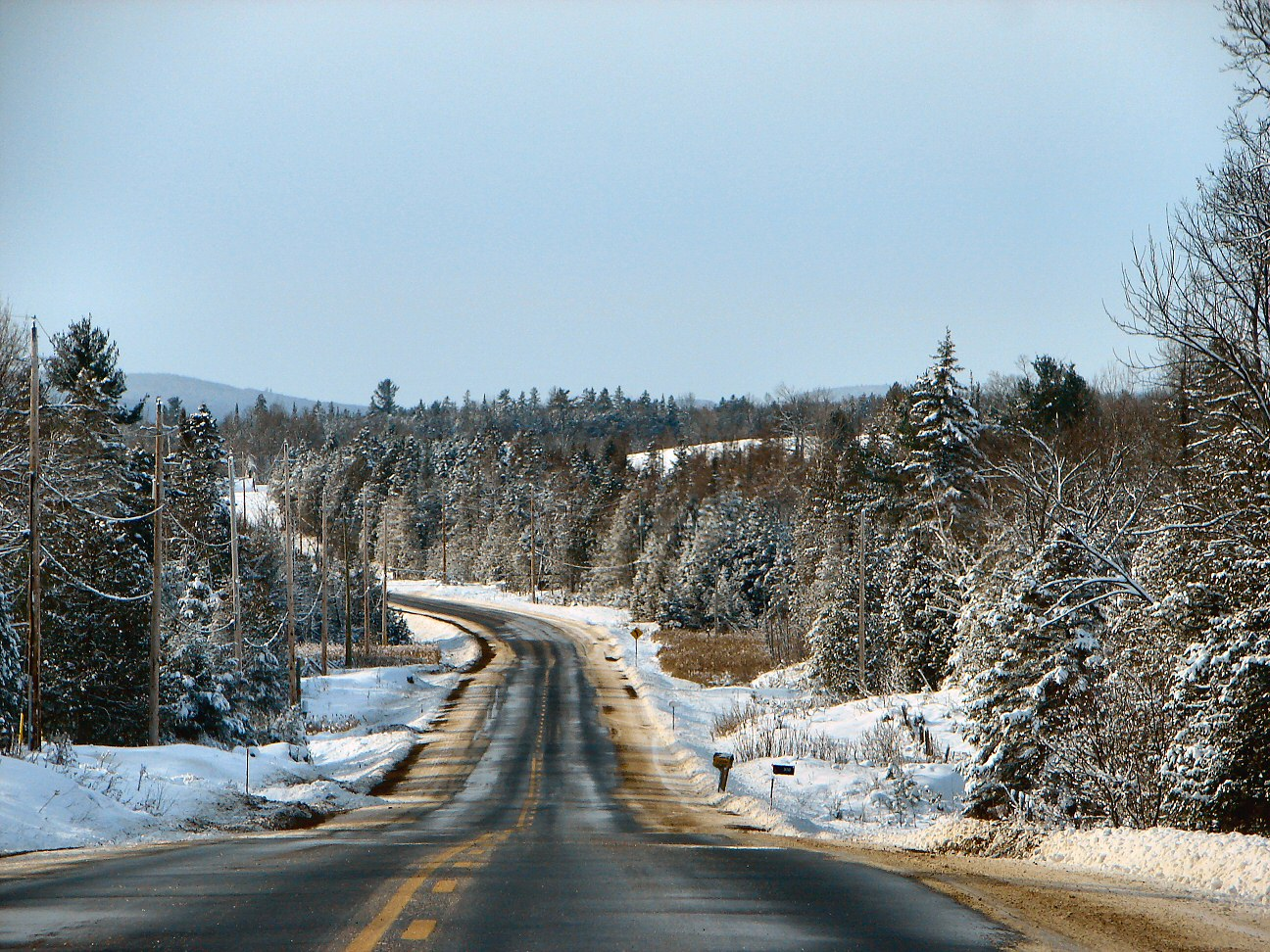
Highway 132 between Renfrew and Shamrock

Highway 132 entering Renfrew

Highway 132 is a short connector highway that travels between Dacre and Renfrew, connecting Highway 41 with Highway 17 via Highway 60. The majority of the route travels through the Canadian Shield, with the exception of the final few kilometres approaching Renfrew, where it descends into the Ottawa Valley. Because of its rugged surroundings, there is relatively little human habitation along the route outside of the communities of Dacre and Shamrock.

Beginning at a junction with Highway 41 just west of Dacre, Highway 132 progresses east as the mainline; drivers must turn to remain on Highway 41. After passing through forests for 2 kilometres (1.2 mi), the route enters the small community of Dacre, where it intersects former Highway 513 (Scotch Bush Road) north to Hyndford. Leaving Dacre, the highway passes by several farms as it dips south to cross Constant Creek, a tributary of the Madawaska River, before turning east-northeast. It meanders around several large swamps and small lakes that dot the Madawaska Highlands, otherwise passing through thick forests for the next 8.2 kilometres (5.1 mi) until it enters a clearing and the hamlet of Shamrock.

The next 10 kilometres (6.2 mi) of Highway 132 is predominantly surrounded by impervious forests, although it encounters Renfrew County Road 34 (Whelan Road) midway through this section, turning northeast at that junction. The route descends gradually into the Ottawa Valley immediately before intersecting Renfrew County Road 5 (Stone Road). Here the forests give way to agricultural fields for the next 4 kilometres (2.5 mi), before the highway enters Renfrew at Riverview Drive and become urban. Within Renfew, it follows Lisgar Avenue, Lochiel Street North and Munroe Avenue West before ending downtown at an intersection with Highway 60 (Raglan Avenue).

Like other provincial routes in Ontario, Highway 132 is maintained by the Ministry of Transportation of Ontario. In 2010, traffic surveys conducted by the ministry showed that on average, 2,500 vehicles used the highway daily along the section between Renfrew County Road 5 (Stone Road) and Highway 60, while 1,600 vehicles did so each day along the remainder of the route, the highest and lowest counts along the highway, respectively.

== History ==
Highway 132 was assumed by the Department of Highways on January 11, 1956. Prior to the designation of Highway 132, no other highways connected with Highway 17 between Pembroke, where it met Highway 62, and Arnprior, where it met Highway 29. When Highway 132 was assumed, Highway 60 did not extend beyond Highway 41 at Golden Lake, northwest of Eganville.

Highway 60 was extended to Highway 17 near Rosebank, north of Renfrew, circa 1961. With the construction of the Renfrew Bypass, which began in June 1974, and was completed in 1977, the section of Highway 17 between O'Brien Road east of Renfrew and Haley Road north of Haley Station was renumbered as an extension of Highway 60; this became the new eastern terminus of Highway 132. Although some minor realignments have occurred over the years, the route has more or less remained unchanged since its designation.

== Major intersections ==
The following table lists the major junctions along Highway 132, as noted by the Ministry of Transportation of Ontario. The entire route is located in Renfrew County.

Location	km	mi	Destinations	Notes
Renfrew	0.0	0.0	Highway 60 (Raglan Street) – Douglas, Huntsville	
Admaston Bromley	5.7	3.5	County Road 5 west (Stone Road)	
Admaston Bromley	11.9	7.4	County Road 34 south (Whelan Road)	
Greater Madawaska–Bonnechere Valley boundary	27.7	17.2	Scotch Bush Road	Dacre; formerly Highway 513 north
Bonnechere Valley	30.3	18.8	Highway 41 – Denbigh, Eganville	
1.000 mi = 1.609 km; 1.000 km = 0.621 mi
