= Smith High School =

Smith High School may refer to:

== Canada ==
- Bishop Smith Catholic High School, Pembroke, Ontario, Canada

== Israel ==
- Charles E. Smith High School, Jerusalem, Israel

== United States ==
- E. E. Smith High School, Fayetteville, North Carolina, U.S.
- E. O. Smith High School, Storrs, Connecticut, U.S.
- Newman Smith High School, Carrollton, Texas, U.S.
- Oscar F. Smith High School, Chesapeake, Virginia, U.S.
- Smith Vocational and Agricultural High School, Northampton, Massachusetts, U.S.
- Wanda R. Smith High School, Keene, Texas, U.S.
- A. Maceo Smith New Tech High School, Dallas, Texas, U.S
- Alfred E. Smith Career and Technical Education High School, Bronx, New York, U.S.
- Ben L. Smith High School, a Guilford county school, North Carolina, U.S.

== See also ==
- Smith Center High School, Smith Center, Kansas, U.S.
- Smith's Hill High School, Wollongong, New South Wales, Australia
- Smiths Station High School, Smiths Station, Alabama, U.S.
- Smith-Cotton High School, Sedalia, Missouri, U.S.
- Northside High School (Fort Smith, Arkansas), formerly Fort Smith High School
