= Andy O'Brien (journalist) =

Canadian sports journalist

- Born: February 11, 1910; Renfrew, Ontario
- Died: April 19, 1987 (aged 77)
- Education: Loyola College (BA)
- Occupation: Journalist

Andrew William O'Brien (February 11, 1910 – April 19, 1987) was a Canadian sports journalist. O'Brien spent 42 years covering sports for the Montreal Standard, the Montreal Star, and Weekend Magazine, during which he covered 12 Olympic Games, six Commonwealth Games, 45 Stanley Cups, and 31 Grey Cups.

== Early life ==
O'Brien was born in Renfrew, Ontario, on February 11, 1910, to a major league hockey trainer father. When his family moved to Montreal for his father's job, he worked as a stick boy for the Montreal Maroons during their 1926 Stanley Cup run and the Montreal Maroons Professional Lacrosse Club. O'Brien attended Loyola College, where he played on the football and heavyweight boxing teams. When he graduated with a Bachelor of Arts degree in 1931, Canada was in the midst of the Great Depression and the only work he could find was at Eaton's selling hats.

== Career ==
While working at Eaton's department store, O'Brien came in contact with sports editor Jimmy McDonagh, who hired him to cover amateur baseball games for the Montreal Standard. During his first game, a riot broke out over an umpire's call, and O'Brien's coverage of the event appeared on the front page of the paper the following day. As a result, the Montreal Standard hired O'Brien as one of their full-time reporters by the following week. As a sports editor for the Standard, covering hockey, O'Brien was sued by Detroit Red Wings defenceman Jack Stewart for libel after calling him a "ruffian".

While working for the Montreal Star, O'Brien was sent to cover the 1954 British Empire and Commonwealth Games, specifically the "Miracle Mile" between Roger Bannister and John Landy. Prior to the event, Landy cut the sole of his right foot stepping on a broken beer bottle while showering, or stepping on and breaking a discarded photographer's glass flash bulb leaving the shower or while walking outdoors, but kept the injury hidden. O'Brien discovered the injury and subsequent stitches after the athlete admitted him to his guarded room, before he competed. O'Brien saw blood where Landy, lying covered with a blanket on a cot, had walked. Landy swore him to secrecy for fear of it coming off as an alibi, and then showed O'Brien the stitched wound. After Landy's loss to Bannister, O'Brien broke the story while also apologizing to Landy for spreading the news. His story was later confirmed by the doctor who had treated Landy, but the manager of the Australian team called the reports "pure bunk". Landy refused to communicate with O'Brien when the two met again at the Melbourne 1956 Olympic Games, although Landy later invited O'Brien and his wife to dinner in 1976 during the Montreal Olympic Games. Neither discussed the 1954 incident at the meal.

O'Brien spent 42 years covering sports for the Montreal Standard, the Montreal Star, and Weekend Magazine, during which he covered 12 Olympic Games, six Commonwealth Games, 45 Stanley Cups, and 31 Grey Cups. O'Brien was inducted into the Football Reporters of Canada section of the Canadian Football Hall of Fame in 1980. In 1985, he was awarded the Hockey Hall of Fame's Elmer Ferguson Memorial Award, given "in recognition of distinguished members of the newspaper profession whose words have brought honour to journalism and to hockey." He eventually died on April 19, 1987, due to illness.

== Selected publications ==
The following is a list of selected publications:

- Rocket Richard (1961)
- Headline hockey (1963)
- Les Canadiens. The story of the Montreal Canadiens (1967)
- Hockey wingman: a novel (1967)
- Fire-wagon hockey; the story of Montreal Canadiens (1967)
- Young hockey champions (1969)
- The Jacques Plante story (1972)
- Superstars; hockey's greatest players (1973)
