= Jack Fraser (ice hockey, born 1882) =

Canadian ice hockey player

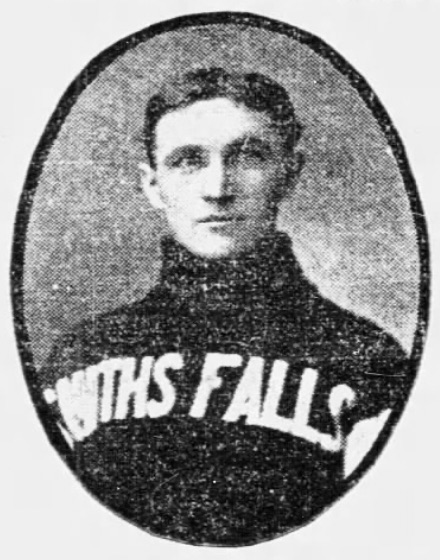
- Fraser with Smiths Falls HC in 1905–06
- Born: May 28, 1882; Renfrew, Ontario, Canada
- Died: April 22, 1942 (aged 59); Brandon, Manitoba, Canada
- Height: 5 ft 10 in (178 cm)
- Weight: 175 lb (79 kg; 12 st 7 lb)
- Position: Left wing
- Shot: Left
- Played for: Renfrew Creamery Kings
- Playing career: 1902–1915

John Thomas Fraser (May 28, 1882 – April 22, 1942) was a Canadian amateur and professional ice hockey winger from Renfrew, Ontario. He played with the Renfrew Creamery Kings of the National Hockey Association in the 1909–10 season.

Fraser was also a member of two Stanley Cup challenge series, with Smiths Falls Hockey Club in 1906 and with the Ottawa Victorias in 1908, ending up at the losing side both times (to the Ottawa Hockey Club and Montreal Wanderers respectively).
