= John Lorn McDougall Sr. =

Canadian politician and businessman

John Lorn McDougall (1800 – May 17, 1860) was a businessman and political figure in Canada West.

He was born on the Isle of Mull, Scotland in 1800, orphaned at a young age and raised by aunts from his mother's family. He joined the Hudson's Bay Company in Scotland as a clerk and came to Lower Canada in 1820. He worked in the fur trade in the Ottawa River and Timiskaming districts.

He later purchased farm land near Renfrew on the Bonnechere River. In 1840, he retired from the Hudson's Bay Company, settled in Renfrew and opened a general store there. McDougall also built the first gristmill at Renfrew. He served on the council for the Bathurst District and on the township council for Renfrew, including several terms as reeve.

He was elected to the Legislative Assembly of the Province of Canada in 1857 but resigned in 1858 to provide a seat in the assembly for William Cayley, who had been named to the Executive Council. Shortly afterwards, he was named coroner for the United Counties of Lanark and Renfrew. He died in Renfrew, Canada West in 1860 after an extended illness.

His son, also named John Lorn, became Auditor General of Canada in 1878.
