= Garnet Kearney =

Dr. Garnet Harvey Kearney (1884–1971) was a Canadian medical doctor, teacher, and pioneer. He practiced medicine in the North Peace region from 1935 until the early 1960s.

Born in Renfrew, Ontario, he received his Ph.D. in medicine from McGill University. During World War I, Kearney served as a ship's medical doctor for various freighters and troop convoys. Later in the war, he became a front-line first-aid medic until the end of the war. He married Marjorie Van Volkingburgh in 1944, and she died in 1954.

Kearney arrived in Fort St. John, British Columbia in 1935, replacing a Dr. Brown, the first medical doctor in Fort St. John. He served as the town's only medical doctor for some time. He was an early advocate of government funded medical care, and he did not charge for his services if the patient could not afford them.

In 1939, Kearney operated on a man via radio. Twenty-one-year-old Gordon Stock, in Watson Lake, was suffering from delirium and urgently need brain surgery. Jack Baker, the man's employer, radioed Kearney asking for instructions. Kearney correctly diagnosed Stock as having a cyst on his brain, and informed Baker that surgery to relieve pressure was necessary immediately, as the man would die without it. The remote surgery was a success, and Stock made a full recovery.

He died on 20 October 1971, in British Columbia, Canada, at the age of 87, and was buried in Fort Saint John, Peace River, British Columbia, Canada. A school in Fort St. John, Dr. Kearney Middle School (formerly Junior Secondary School), is named in his honour.
