= Renfrew County Catholic District School Board =

Location
- 499 Pembroke St. West, Pembroke, Ontario K8A 5P1 Canada

District information
- Chair of the board: Bob Schreader
- Director of education: Mark Searson
- Schools: 19 elementary schools 2 high schools 3 secondary alternative sites
- Budget: CA$62 million million

Students and staff
- Students: 5,000 approximately

Other information
- Elected trustees: 7
- Student trustees: 2
- Website: rccdsb.edu.on.ca

The Renfrew County Catholic District School Board (RCCDSB, known as English-language Separate District School Board No. 28 prior to 1999)is the administrative body that manages the operations of the Catholic primary and secondary schools in the County of Renfrew in Ontario, Canada.

== Organization ==
The Renfrew County Catholic District School Board runs 19 primary schools and 2 secondary schools, all of which are English, separate schools. Between the 22 schools the Renfrew County Catholic District School Board has 550 employees that provide education for over 5000 students in 16 different communities. The Renfrew County Catholic District School Board is 1 of 72 school boards in Ontario. The administrative office is located in Pembroke, Ontario. The current Director of Education is Michele Arbour and the Chairperson of the Board of Trustees is Bob Michaud.

== Secondary schools ==
School	Location	Principal	Vice Principal(s)	Grades	Number of Students	Link
Bishop Smith Catholic High School	Pembroke, Ontario	Clint Young	Julie Huckabone, Erik Lemke	8-12	900	
St. Joseph's Catholic High School	Renfrew, Ontario	Brennan Trainor	Tony Jacyno	8-12	400	

== Primary schools ==
School	Location	Principal	Vice Principal	Grades	Links
John XXIII Catholic School	Arnprior, Ontario	Heidi Fraser	N/A	K-8	
St. Joseph's Catholic School	Arnprior, Ontario	Mary-Lise Rowat	Ryan Kranz	K-8	
St. John Bosco Catholic School	Barry's Bay, Ontario	Elizabeth Burchat	Julia Graydon	K-8	
St. Joseph's Catholic School	Calabogie, Ontario	Rory Donohue	N/A	K-8	
St. Anthony's Catholic School	Chalk River, Ontario	Dave Noble	Sally Douglas	K-8	
George Vanier Catholic School	Combermere, Ontario	Ann Marie Landon	N/A	K-8	
St. Mary's Catholic School	Deep River, Ontario	Cheryl St-Élier	N/A	K-8	
St. Michael's Catholic School	Douglas, Ontario	Mary Catherine Brisco	N/A	K-7	
St. James Catholic School	Eganville, Ontario	Maureen Enright	N/A	K-8	
St. Andrew's Catholic School	Killaloe, Ontario	Scott Nichol	N/A	K-8	
Cathedral Catholic School	Pembroke, Ontario	Karen Kenny	N/A	K-7	
Holy Name Catholic School	Pembroke, Ontario	Amy Sicoli	N/A	K-7	
Our Lady of Lourdes Catholic School	Pembroke, Ontario	Derek Lennox	N/A	K-7	
Our Lady of Sorrows Catholic School	Petawawa, Ontario	Christina Brown	Karen Keels	K-7	
St. Francis of Assisi Catholic School	Petawawa, Ontario	John Leitch	Natalie Marchment	K-7	
Our Lady of Fatima Catholic School	Renfrew, Ontario	Jeannie Armstrong	N/A	K-7	
St. Thomas the Apostle Catholic School	Renfrew, Ontario	Connie Dick	N/A	K-7	
Our Lady of Grace Catholic School	Westmeath, Ontario	Melissa Carroll-Dubeau	N/A	K-7	
St. Mary's Catholic School	Wilno, Ontario	Ann Lepine	N/A	K-8	
Valleycrest Pembroke	Pembroke, Ontario	Myles Sabourin	N/A	N/A	
Valleycrest Renfrew	Renfrew, Ontario	Myles Sabourin	N/A	N/A	

- N/A denotes no vice principal is present in the school.

== Administration ==
Position	Incumbent	Appointed	Former Position
Director of Education	Michele Arbour	November 2007	Superintendent of Educational Services
Superintendent of Educational Services	Jaimie Perry	January 2008	Principal, St. Joseph's High School
Superintendent of Educational Services	Peter Adam	September 2011	Principal, Bishop Smith Catholic High School
Superintendent of Educational Services	Mark Searson	September 2013	Principal, Bishop Smith Catholic High School
Superintendent of Business Services	Mary Lynn Schauer		

== See also ==
- List of school districts in Ontario
- List of high schools in Ontario
