= Renfrew Fair =

Annual event in Ontario

Coordinates: 45.46859°N 76.6756°W

The Renfrew Fair is an annual event held in Renfrew, Ontario. The fair has been operating since 1852, when it was "organized by local Scotsmen with a government grant".

As of 1918, it was reportedly the "second largest county fair in Ontario".
