= Ottawa Valley English =

Canadian English of the Ottawa Valley

Ottawa Valley English is Canadian English of the Ottawa Valley, particularly in reference to the historical local varieties of the area, now largely in decline. The accents of such traditional varieties are commonly referred to as an Ottawa Valley twang or brogue. The Ottawa Valley historically extends along the Ottawa River from northwest of Montreal through the city of Ottawa and north of Algonquin Park. The Atlas of North American English identifies an Ottawa Valley traditional dialect enclave in Arnprior, which lacks the Canadian raising of /aʊ/ and strongly fronts /ɑ/ before /r/, but neither feature is documented in the City of Ottawa itself or in other nearby urban areas, which speak Standard Canadian English.

In the 1980s, linguist Ian Pringle and colleagues claimed that there was a huge variation in dialect features throughout the thinly-populated Ottawa Valley, notably with large Hiberno-English influence; however, the nature of such variation has never been thoroughly described. At a general phonetic level, the Ottawa Valley twang of Irish-descended people is characterized by raising of /aɪ/ and /aʊ/ in all contexts, as opposed to the Canadian English's more typical "Canadian raising", which is context-dependent. In terms of syntax, the twang features the use of "for to" in place of the "to" initiative. Additionally, various regions of the Ottawa Valley may possess their own vocabularies (lexical features) as well.

== History ==
While the French were among the first to settle in the Ottawa Valley during the early-19th-century fur trade, they were later joined by the Irish and Scottish and they became the major cultural groups in the region. Work and trade opportunities and access to cheap land all made settlement in the Ottawa Valley attractive. The valley's population peaked in the years following 1891.

Although joined by Belgian, Swiss, Italian, German, Polish, and Loyalist settlers, those cultures managed to remain fairly distinct from one another. Concentrating in certain areas and preserving heritage languages and religions, the cultural pockets were what eventually led to the formation of the valley's townships. While the characteristics of the Ottawa Valley twang are evident throughout the Glengarry, Lanark, Renfrew, Grenville, Dundas, Stormont, Prescott, and Russell Counties, for example, each area also has its unique vocabulary and phonological traits as well.

=== Irish influence ===
The Irish were undoubtedly the most significant group of settlers in the Ottawa Valley in terms of numbers, as such they had the largest influence on the accents spoken there. In some townships, as many as 95% of the population claimed to be of Irish ethnicity in 1941. While much of Irish immigration can be attributed to the 19th-century famines, the Irish were also drawn to the Ottawa Valley for work opportunities, examples being in the thriving timber industry at the time as well as infrastructure projects.

=== Scottish influence ===
Following the Napoleonic Wars, Scottish groups settled primarily in the Glengarry, Lanark, and Renfrew Counties. Soldiers who had served the British Crown during the wars were offered free land grants throughout Upper Canada, particularly in the area known today as the Ottawa Valley. Over-represented in the British armed forces, Scottish men and their families received grants and ended up settling in the valley. Those who settled in Glengarry County were mostly Gaelic-speakers arriving from the Scottish Highlands, who eventually learned English from the neighbouring Loyalists to the west and the south. Many of Lanark County's residents, however, originated from the Scottish Lowlands. While Renfrew County was also a Scottish Highland settlement, many of its original settlers seemed to have already known English upon their arrival.

== Phonological features ==
The fronting of /ɑ/ before /r/ and the consistent raising of /aɪ/ and /aʊ/ in any context, all of which is reminiscent of Irish and Scottish English, have been reported in traditional speakers of the Ottawa Valley. The north shore of the St. Lawrence Valley is home to Loyalist dialect pockets from the United States, including a dominant trend of the absence of the cot–caught merger, unlike most speakers of Standard Canadian English.

== Lexical features ==
English in Glengarry features occasional borrowing from Gaelic words, an example being "gruamach" to describe a gloomy and overcast day. Some phonological features are also transferred from Gaelic, such as the marked devoicing of final voiced consonants as well as the alteration of consonant clusters.

Many residents of Lanark County originated from the Scottish Lowlands, bringing vocabulary elements of their heritage dialects as well. The term "ben," for example, is used to refer to what most Canadians would call a "living room" or what Ottawa Valley inhabitants would call a "parlour." "Rones" is used in place of "eavestroughs" and "gutters."

Phonologically, the English of Renfrew County is influenced by Polish-speakers in the region but also by a greater contact with Irish populations.

One of the strongest Irish influences on Ottawa Valley twang and the English of the area, in general, is the introduction of "for to." That is a syntactic feature where "for" is added to the "to" infinitive before verbs. The use of "for to" is an important characteristic of Belfast English, a prominent dialect spoken in Northern Ireland. While that is Irish-influenced, there has also been evidence of its use in Early English. Until around the 1600s, citizens of the poorer and lower classes have been known to use "for to" in their speech and dialogues. The following are common uses of the phrase: It can be used in statements of purpose ("I went to the shop for to get the cheese"), in exclamations ("For to tell her like that!"), and sentences where the infinitive is featured as the subject ("For to stay here would just be as expensive"). This trait can also be found in another variety of Canadian English, namely Newfoundland English, as shown in popular Newfoundland folk songs such as Grey Foggy Day and The Prisoner of Newfoundland, with the former expressing that the singer would "come home for to stay" and the latter expressing that the singer was "consigned to Harvey's wharf a cargo for to land".

== Current state ==
Although home to a large, diverse collection of heritages and cultures, the distinctive traits of the Ottawa Valley Twang are arguably in decline. Years ago in 1975, Chambers observed, "Little of this twang can be found today as most of the surrounding area and all the city have assimilated to General English." As a result, there is also a lack of literature in this subject. The study by Ian Pringle and Enoch Padolsky is among the only research entirely focused on Ottawa Valley and its linguistic features and characteristics.

Even though it is one of the most recognizable traits of the Ottawa Valley twang, the data available in regards to the use of "for to" is limited and susceptible to skewing. While speakers have historically used that syntactic feature, many sentences containing it are considered grammatically incorrect in today's Standard Canadian English. As a result, the use of "for to" may be underreported or even further denounced by what is sometimes referred to as "negative over reporting."

== See also ==
- Canadian raising
- Canadian Shift
- Canadian English
- Scottish Canadian
- Irish Canadian
