= Weekend Magazine =

Australian television programme

Weekend Magazine was a long-running television show, shown by the Australian Broadcasting Corporation. Its original producer was Rex Clayton, with subsequent producers including Ivan Chapman. This short format show was typically filmed by the ABC's news correspondents in their spare time, the diversity of its subject matter reflecting the diversity of their interests. During the 1970s, Weekend Magazine was run after the Sunday evening news. "Sunspot", the distinctive theme music accompanying its credits, was written by Tony Osborne. The programme was terminated by ABC management during the 1980s, in the face of outcry from audience and journalists alike.
