= St. Joseph's High School (Renfrew, Ontario) =

Location
- 835 First Street; Renfew, Renfrew County, Ontario; Canada; 45.46473°N 76.67084°W

Information
- School type: High school
- Religious affiliation: Roman Catholic
- School board: Renfrew County Catholic District School Board
- Principal: Scott Nichol
- Grades: 8-12
- Enrollment: 650
- Language: English
- Colours: Burgundy & Grey
- Team name: Jaguars
- Website: jagpride.net

St. Joseph's Catholic High School is a Roman Catholic high school managed by the Renfrew County Catholic District School Board (RCCDSB), in Renfrew, Ontario, Canada.

== Organization ==
The school educates in grades 8–12 primarily in English. It has approximately 650 students as of the 2022-23 school year. That number is expected to double in 2025 with a new addition.

=== Principals ===
- 2008 - June 2011: Mark Searson
- September 2011 – June 2019: Brennan Trainor

Principal Derek Lennox September 2019 –

Pam Dickerson 2024–Present

== Academic standards ==
The Fraser Institute report card for 2011-12 placed the school as a joint third out of 725 high schools in the province of Ontario. The school achieved a score of 9.2 out of 10.

== Sport and extra-curricular activities ==
The school's sports teams are known as the "Jaguars." The midget girls' discus provincial championship at the 2011 Ontario high school track and field championships was won by St. Joseph's Sonya Bergin. The school were National Champions in the Reach for the Top televised quiz competition in 1992–93.

== Controversies ==
In February 2023, the school's administration suspended a student for publicly voicing opinions in class viewed to be transphobic by school officials. The student, Josh Alexander, was later arrested for breaching a subsequent exclusion order. The school's disciplinary actions were considered to be controversial by some, most notably right-wing Canadian media outlets, due to alleged conflict with the school's Catholic beliefs. Parents of transgender students attending the school have voiced disappointment in these negative responses to the school's stated attempts to protect transgender students from harassment.

== See also ==
- Education in Ontario
- List of secondary schools in Ontario
