= Ottawa Valley =

Valley in Ontario and Quebec in Canada

Coordinates: 45.5°N 76.1°W

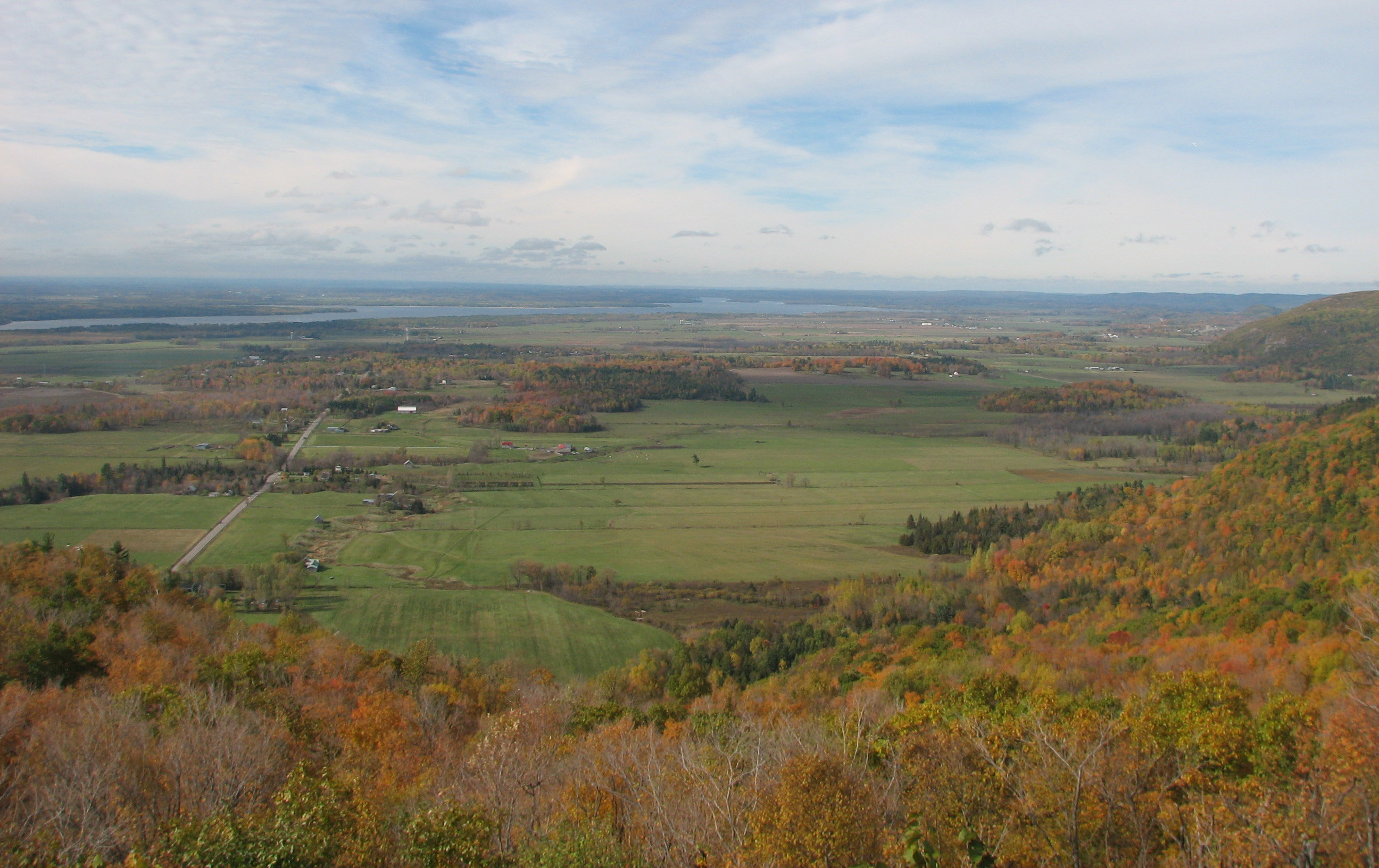
The Ottawa River crossing the Ottawa Valley near the City of Ottawa. In the foreground, skirts of the Gatineau Hills make up part of the southern tip of the Canadian Shield.

The Ottawa Valley (Vallée d'Outaouais) is a rift valley of the Ottawa River (Rivière des Outaouais), along the boundary between Eastern Ontario and the Outaouais, Quebec, Canada. The valley is the transition between the Saint Lawrence Lowlands and the Canadian Shield. Because of the surrounding shield, the valley is narrow at its western end and then becomes increasingly wide (mainly on the Ontario side of the river) as it progresses eastward. The underlying geophysical structure is the Ottawa-Bonnechere Graben. Approximately 1.3 million people reside in the valley (and along its tributaries), around 80% of whom reside in Ottawa. The total area of the Ottawa Valley is 2.4 million ha (6 million ac). The National Capital Region area has just over 1.4 million inhabitants in both provinces.

Near the City of Ottawa, the Ottawa Valley merges with the St. Lawrence Valley to the south to create a delta of flat farmland stretching unbroken from the Ottawa River to the Saint Lawrence River as far east as the island of Montreal, where the two rivers meet.

From west to east, communities in the Ottawa Valley include Deep River (with nearby Chalk River, the site of Canada's first nuclear reactor program), Mattawa, Petawawa (a major Canadian military base), Pembroke (where Samuel de Champlain landed briefly), Fort Coulonge, Shawville, Renfrew, Quyon, Arnprior, Ottawa (the nation's capital), Rockland, L'Orignal, Hawkesbury, and Rigaud and Almonte, Round Lake Centre, Dacre, Douglas, Hyndford, Scotch Bush, Osceola and Barr Line.

== History ==
The entire Ottawa Valley is claimed to be within Omàmiwininiwak (Algonquin Country traditional territory) and is presently under land claim.

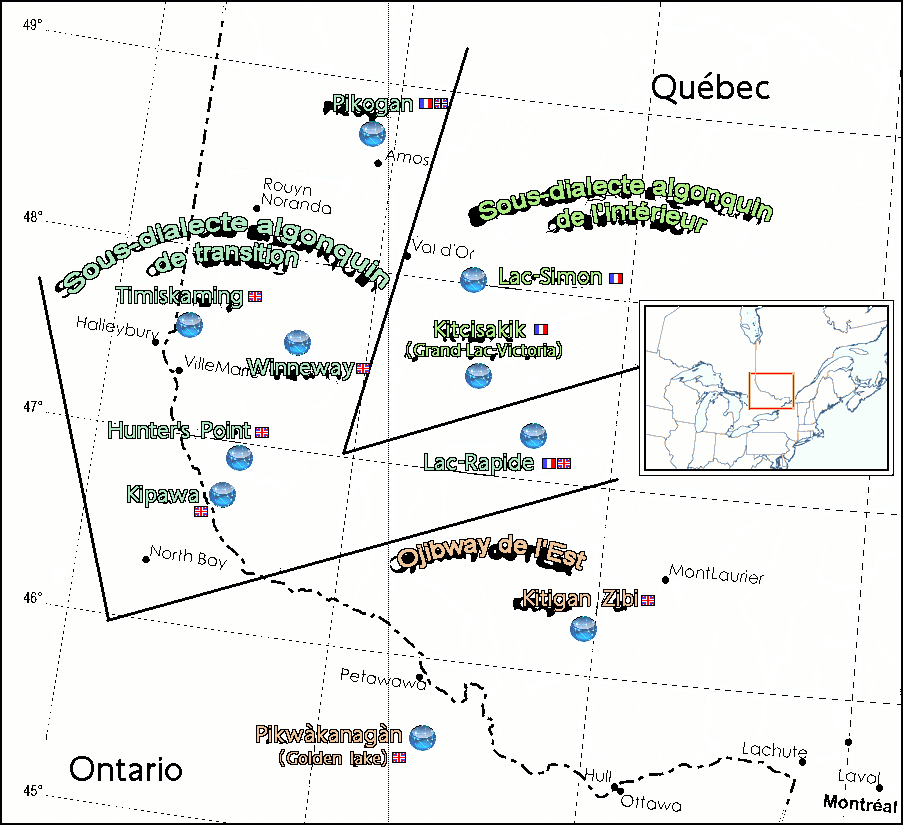
Federally Recognized Algonquin Communities and Dialect Isoglosses

The entire territory south of the Ottawa River was conquered by the Haudenosaunee during the French-Indian War/Seven Years' War, who then left it to the British Crown when they relocated to upstate New York. As a result the majority of Algonquins reside on the Quebec (north) side of the border, where all but two Algonquin communities are located. However, there are many Algonquin communities and individuals not recognized as such by the Government of Canada under the Indian Act. These individuals are referred to as "non-status Indians". Ardoch Algonquin First Nation is one such community located in the Ottawa Valley fighting for the return of the land they lost to the Haudenosaunee. As a relatively recent adaptation resulting from the economic pressures of the encroachment of non-native settling of the valley, the Algonquin First Nation is unevenly distributed within their territory.

After the arrival of European settlers in North America, the first major industry of the Ottawa Valley was fur trading. The valley was part of the major cross-country route for French-Canadian Voyageurs, who would paddle canoes up the Ottawa River as far as Mattawa and then portage west through various rivers and lakes to Georgian Bay on Lake Huron. Later, lumber became the valley's major industry, and it is still important in the far western part where the valley is narrow and little farmland is available. Today, the vast majority of the valley's residents live at its eastern end in Ottawa and its suburbs, where government and technology are major industries.

In the areas of Morrison's Island and Allumette Island there were many archaeological sites found from the earlier years of the Algonquin First Nations tribes. Many of these sites were found by the late Clyde C. Kennedy, who was a student of history; he was very interested in history and worked hard while researching the sites. The items found on the different sites are dated from about five thousand years ago to about two thousand years ago, and are a range of different things from native copper, to spear heads.

=== Major settlements in the Upper Ottawa Valley ===
Petawawa is a town located in Renfrew County, in the Ottawa Valley. It was thought to have been first settled by the Algonquian peoples and the name comes from their language meaning "where one hears the noise of the water". Samuel de Champlain passed through the area and it was used as an important location for the Hudson's Bay Company. Many of the first settlers were of Irish, Scottish, and later German origin. Today Petawawa is the home of one of the largest Canadian Forces Land Force Command bases in Canada CFB Petawawa.

Pembroke is located in Renfrew County on the Ottawa River. It is known as “the heart of the Ottawa Valley”. It was established in 1828 by pioneers and became a centre for the logging industry. Today, it is the largest regional service centre between Ottawa and North Bay.

=== Historical notes ===
Samuel de Champlain spent the years between 1613 and 1615 traveling the Ottawa River with Algonquin and Wendat guides. He was the first documented European to see the Ottawa Valley. When Champlain first arrived there the Wendat, Algonquin, Haudenosaunee, and Odawa tribes were living in the Valley. In charting the new land Champlain inaugurated the route that would be used by French fur traders for the next 200 years.*Between 1847 and 1879 a "horse railway" was used to portage passengers from the Ottawa River steamboat in a horse-drawn car for 5.5 kilometres along the wooded shore, around the Chats Falls, on the Quebec side of the river between the ghost villages of Pontiac Village and Union Village, near Quyon Quebec, to another steamboat to continue their journey upriver.

== Language ==
English and French are both commonly spoken throughout the Ottawa Valley on both sides of the river. The Counties of Prescott and Russell County, in the Ottawa Valley, has the highest concentration of francophones in Canada west of Quebec. The variant of French spoken in this area of the province is also based on Quebec French, but distinctly different from that of the Outaouais region.

=== Valley twang ===
Regional English accents are rare west of Québec, but because of its isolation before the arrival of the railways and also by the mixture of the dominant French, Irish and Scottish populations, the valley at one time developed a distinctive dialect, referred to as the Ottawa Valley Twang. Many traces of it can still be heard today, especially in the valley's more isolated western portions.

== Music and musical heritage ==
The Ottawa Valley has rich musical heritage that finds its roots in the music traditions of Irish and French immigrants. The music and traditions continued and developed in the lumber camps that are storied part of the Ottawa River lumber industry. Traditions continued in the Valley's festivals and hotels. Of these, Lennox Gavan's Hotel in Quyon, Quebec and Fred Meilleur's Chapeau Hotel on L'Ile aux Allumettes (now burned down), Quebec were particularly influential. Mac Beattie and the Melodiers were also large influences on keeping the Ottawa Valley's musical culture vibrant and living. Today, many performers keep the musical traditions alive, including Gail Gavan, Terry McLeish, April Verch and Trevor Grahl.

== Food ==
The Ottawa Valley has a rich beef and corn farming community. There are a great many local breweries spread about the valley. The village of Killaloe is also the birthplace of the pastry known as a "beaver tail".

== Transportation ==
There are two 400-series highways which service the Ottawa Valley region on the southern side (Ontario side) of the Ottawa River, Highway 417 (The Queensway) which runs east–west through Ottawa and Highway 416 (The Veterans Memorial Highway) which runs north–south. To the west of Ottawa, Highway 417 eventually ends near Arnprior, where it continues westward as the two-lane Highway 17. In Ottawa there is a split in the Queensway near Cyrville and Pineview where Highway 174 branches off from Highway 417 and runs further north. East of Ottawa Highway 174 eventually ends and becomes County Road 17 again, and both it and Highway 417 continue eastwards to eventually merge near the Quebec border. At its northernmost point Highway 416 connects to Highway 417 in Ottawa near Nepean, and at its southernmost point it connects with Highway 401 near Prescott.

On the Northern side (Quebec side) of the Ottawa river Autoroute 5 runs primarily North-South through Gatineau starting from the Macdonald Cartier Bridge. It eventually becomes Quebec Route 105 further north. Route 148 runs primarily east–west through Gatineau and Hull; however, to the west of Hull it goes north-westward to south-eastern in order to follow the direction of the Ottawa River.

There are five major road bridges which cross the Ottawa River in the Ottawa area. There are also three road bridges to the west of the city and one to the east, all along Country Road 17 and Route 148. There are also a number of ferries at various points along the river which can transport people and vehicles across.

Part of the Trans Canada Railway passes through the Ottawa Valley. Via Rail operates passenger trains to and from Ottawa and other towns in the Ottawa Valley. The main passenger runs which operate from the region are Ottawa to Montreal and Ottawa to Toronto. The closest cities along the rail line to Ottawa are Montreal to the east of Ottawa and Brockville to the South. Freight trains also operate on the railway and Ottawa has a sizable train yard. A new commuter rail line between Ottawa and Pembroke is in the planning stages, along the Beachburg spur line.

The Ottawa Macdonald–Cartier International Airport, ICAO Code CYOW operates both flights to other major Canadian cities and other international airports. The airport is also a major hub for diplomats and international figures to come into Canada. Major airlines such as Air Canada, West jet, American Airlines and First Air use the airport consistently. The airport is also home to two flight training colleges on the north side of the field. It is Canada's 7th busiest airport.

== Notable people ==
Among the well-known people who hail from the Ottawa Valley, are former governor-general and broadcaster Adrienne Clarkson, Alanis Morissette, Margaret Atwood, Lorne Greene, railroad builder Michael James Heney, Guy Lafleur, Bryan Murray, Terry Murray, Frank Finnigan, Bruce Cockburn, Peter Jennings, Ryan Reynolds, Matthew Perry, Dan Aykroyd, Mark Redman, Norm Macdonald, Tom Green, Rich Little, Paul Anka, Alan Verch and Princess Margriet, sister of Princess Beatrix of the Netherlands.

Many Ottawa natives have excelled in the athletic world, particularly winter sports. Barbara Ann Scott was world figure skating champion and won the gold medal at St. Moritz, Switzerland in 1948. Skier Ann Heggtveit won a gold medal at the 1960 Winter Olympics in Squaw Valley, California. Elizabeth Manley won the silver medal for women's figure skating at the Calgary Winter Olympics in 1988. The Clifford family has long been associated with skiing in the Ottawa area. Linda Thom won Olympic gold at the 1984 Summer Olympics in Los Angeles. Francis Amyott, from the Britannia Club, won the single canoeing event when it was held for the first time at the Berlin Olympic Games in 1936.

Two Ontario premiers came from the Ottawa Valley - Premier Howard Ferguson (Kemptville) in the 1920s and Premier Dalton McGuinty (Ottawa), who became premier in 2003.

== "Hockey Country" ==
The public relations office of the Ottawa Senators ice hockey team call Ottawa and the Valley "hockey country". Indeed, it is the home not only of the once prominent Senators, which folded in 1934 and came back in 1992, but also of such famous NHL builders as Tommy Gorman and Ambrose O'Brien. With the Senators' arena Canadian Tire Centre (CTC), originally named the "Palladium", located in Kanata, Ontario, which links Ottawa with the Valley, residents of the Upper Ottawa Valley can easily access the games. The CTC is the home of the "Ottawa Sports Hall of Fame", several restaurants, a fitness complex and several businesses. The CTC, including the standing room, has a capacity of holding 20,500 people for any event. Many of the members of the Senators' coaching and management staff in 2010 hail from, or have strong connections to, the town of Shawville.

The Ottawa Valley's Renfrew Millionaires, the creation of lumber baron O'Brien, was a small-town professional hockey team that won the league championship in 1910. Ottawa and the valley are also the home of such outstanding players as Frank Nighbor, Aurel Joliat, Frank "King" Clancy, Frank Boucher, Kurtis Foster and Denis Potvin; the latter was the star defenceman of the New York Islanders dynasty of the late 1970s. Ottawa's Brian Kilrea holds the record as the Ontario Hockey League's longest-serving coach with a record number of games behind the bench of the Ottawa 67's junior hockey team. The 67's have a loyal following that results in sellout games almost every time they step on the ice. The Ottawa 67's play hockey at Lansdowne Park which used to be home to the Ottawa Senators. Lansdowne has a capacity of over 9,682 seats. The Ottawa 67's have won the Memorial Cup twice, in 1984 and 1999, since the team was founded in 1967.

== Geography ==
The Ottawa Valley covers over 7,645 square kilometres. Some 12,800 years ago, glaciers retreated from what is now the Ottawa Valley region, leaving the area covered by the Champlain Sea for thousands of years. Ten thousand years ago the water retreated and land emerged, exposing fossils preserved in limestone, particularly in Eganville along the Bonnechere River and the historical site of the Bonnechere Caves and its subterranean river caverns.

More than half of the Ottawa Valley is now wilderness. Renfrew County, located in the heart of the Ottawa Valley, is the largest county in Ontario. (outside of "districts", administrative regions in Northern Ontario). There are over 900 lakes and four major river systems in the Ottawa Valley. Ottawa itself is at the confluence of three rivers. These are the Ottawa, Gatineau and Rideau rivers.

== The river ==
The Ottawa River is 1,130 kilometres long with a watershed of 140,000 km squared. Its source is Lac Capimitchigama in Quebec. The Ottawa River was first navigated and settled by the Wendat (Huron), Algonquin, Haudenosaunee (Iroquois) and Odawa (Outaouais) people. The Ottawa River bears the name of an aboriginal tribe that traded on the waterway; the "Outaouais" which is French for Ottawa. The Ottawa River provided the means for entrepreneurs to start up their logging business. The river watershed had unlimited resources, loose regulations, and cheap labour pools which allowed the entrepreneurs to quickly increase control over the timber trade. Many people involved in the logging industry took advantage of the waterway and built their empires because of the fast-moving waters and forests along the river. These loggers played a crucial role in the development of the valley community as they guided logs downriver. This subsequently led to the development of major towns and cities such as Ottawa and Gatineau. The Algonquin people called the Ottawa River "Kitchissippi", which means “Great River”. The Algonquin word Kichesippirini means "Big River People". The name Petawawa comes from the Algonquin language meaning "where one hears a noise like this."

== Flora and fauna ==
More than 400 species of animals live in the Ottawa Valley. The white trillium, which grows throughout the Ottawa Valley, has been Ontario's provincial floral emblem since 1937. Its white blossom is associated with peace and hope. White pine, the Ontario provincial tree, was the most commercially important tree during the heyday of the logging industry in the 19th century. It was exported to Europe and used for building the masts of sailing ships. Winter was the best season for cutting timber as trees fell more easily when their sap wasn’t running and ice and snow made it easier to drag the timber. Spring was the season when the loggers would "drive" the logs downriver.

== See also ==
- Canadian ethnicity
- National Capital Region
- Eastern Ontario
- Southern Ontario
