= Bonnechere Valley =

- Township municipality (lower-tier)
- Township of Bonnechere Valley
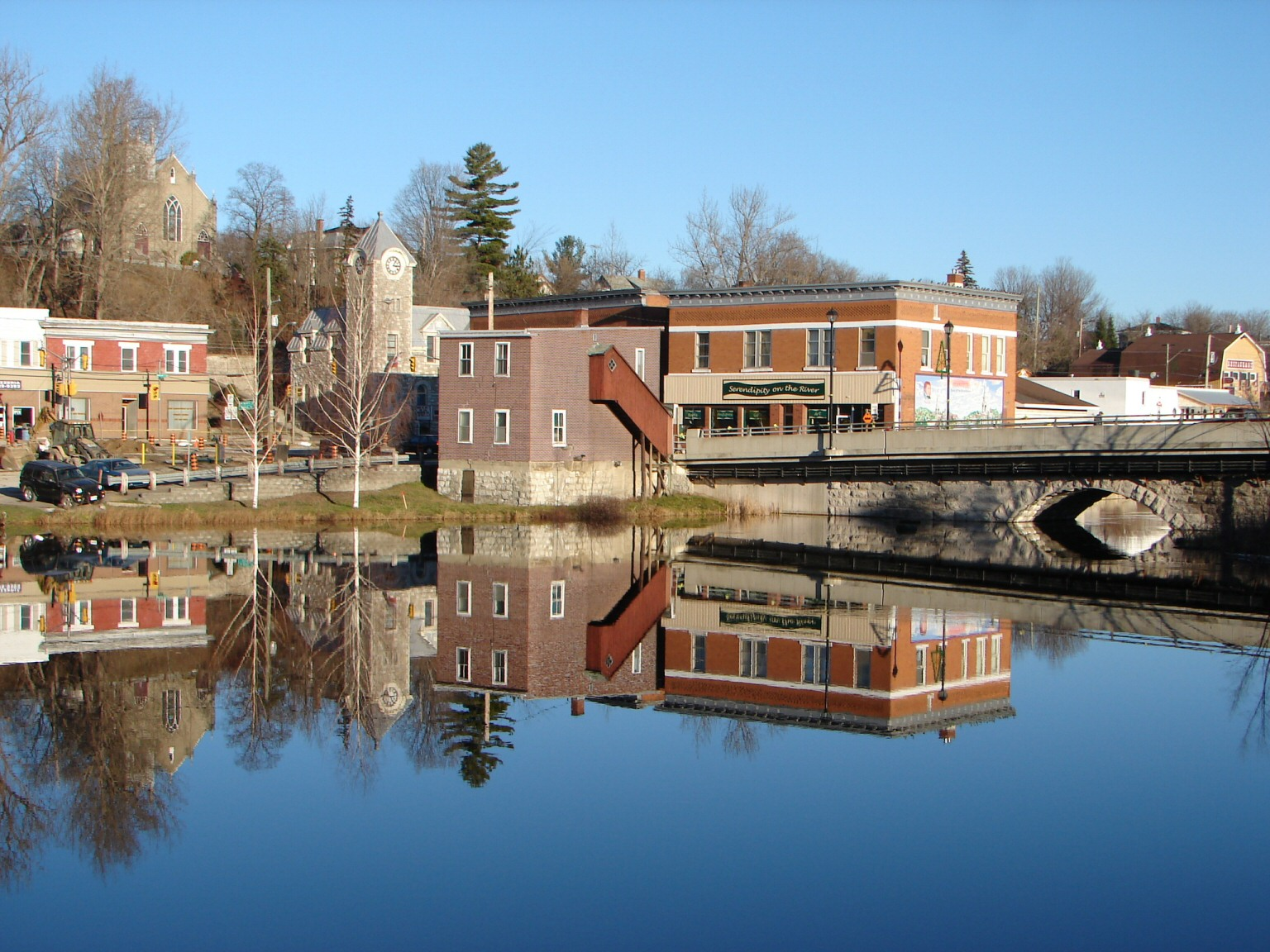
- Community of Eganville in Bonnechere Valley

- Location within Renfrew County Location within Southern Ontario
- Coordinates: 45°27′N 77°08′W
- Country: Canada
- Province: Ontario
- County: Renfrew
- Established: 2001

Government
  - Type: Township
  - Mayor: Jennifer Murphy
  - Federal riding: Algonquin—Renfrew—Pembroke
  - Prov. riding: Renfrew—Nipissing—Pembroke

Area
  - Land: 588.36 km^{2} (227.17 sq mi)

Population (2021)
  - Total: 3,898
  - Density: 6.6/km^{2} (17/sq mi)
- Time zone: UTC-5 (EST)
  - Summer (DST): UTC-4 (EDT)
- Postal code: K0J 1T0
- Area codes: 613, 343
- Website: www.bonnecherevalleytwp.com

Bonnechere Valley is a township municipality in Renfrew County, Ontario, Canada. It had a population of 3,898 in the 2021 Canadian census. It was established on January 1, 2001, by amalgamation of the village of Eganville and the townships of Grattan, Sebastapol, and South Algona.

== Communities ==
The administrative and commercial centre of Bonnechere Valley is Eganville, a small community occupying a deep limestone valley carved at the Fifth Chute of the Bonnechere River.

The township also comprises the smaller communities of Augsburg, Castile, Clontarf, Constant Creek, Cormac, Dacre, Donegal, Esmonde, Grattan, Lake Clear, McGrath, Perrault, Ruby, Silver Lake, Scotch Bush, Vanbrugh, Woermke, and Zadow, as well as the ghost towns of Newfoundout, Balaclava and Foymount.

== History ==
The power of the Bonnechere River has been harnessed since 1848 but it was John Egan's grist mill that gets credit for stimulating the area's economic growth.

In 1911, the Great Fire destroyed many of the buildings in Eganville. 75 homes were lost in all along with schools, churches and industries along both sides on the Bonnechere River. This fire was started by two teenagers smoking cigarettes in a shed. A year later, the Municipal Building was erected, and served as the village post office for almost a century. This building has since become the home of the Bonnechere Museum and one of the most well known symbols of Eganville.

== Demographics ==
In the 2021 Census of Population conducted by Statistics Canada, Bonnechere Valley had a population of 3,898 living in 1,739 of its 2,320 total private dwellings, a change of 6.1% from its 2016 population of 3,674. With a land area of 588.36 km^{2} (227.17 sq mi), it had a population density of 6.6/km^{2} (17.2/sq mi) in 2021.

Canada census – Bonnechere Valley community profile

	2021	2016	2011
Population	3,898 (+6.1% from 2016)	3,674 (-2.4% from 2011)	3,763 (2.7% from 2006)
Land area	588.36 km^{2} (227.17 sq mi)	593.75 km^{2} (229.25 sq mi)	593.19 km^{2} (229.03 sq mi)
Population density	6.6/km^{2} (17/sq mi)	6.2/km^{2} (16/sq mi)	6.3/km^{2} (16/sq mi)
Median age	54.4 (M: 54.0, F: 54.4)	47.6 (M: 46.8, F: 48.5)
Private dwellings	2,320 (total) 1,739 (occupied)	2,317 (total)	2,226 (total)
Median household income	$68,000	$54,240

References: 2021 2016 2011

Historical census populations – Bonnechere Valley
Year	Pop.	±%
2001	3,591	—
2006	3,665	+2.1%
2011	3,763	+2.7%
2016	3,674	−2.4%
2021	3,898	+6.1%
Source: Statistics Canada

== See also ==
- List of townships in Ontario
