= Renfrew, Ontario =

Renfrew
- Town (lower-tier)
- Town of Renfrew
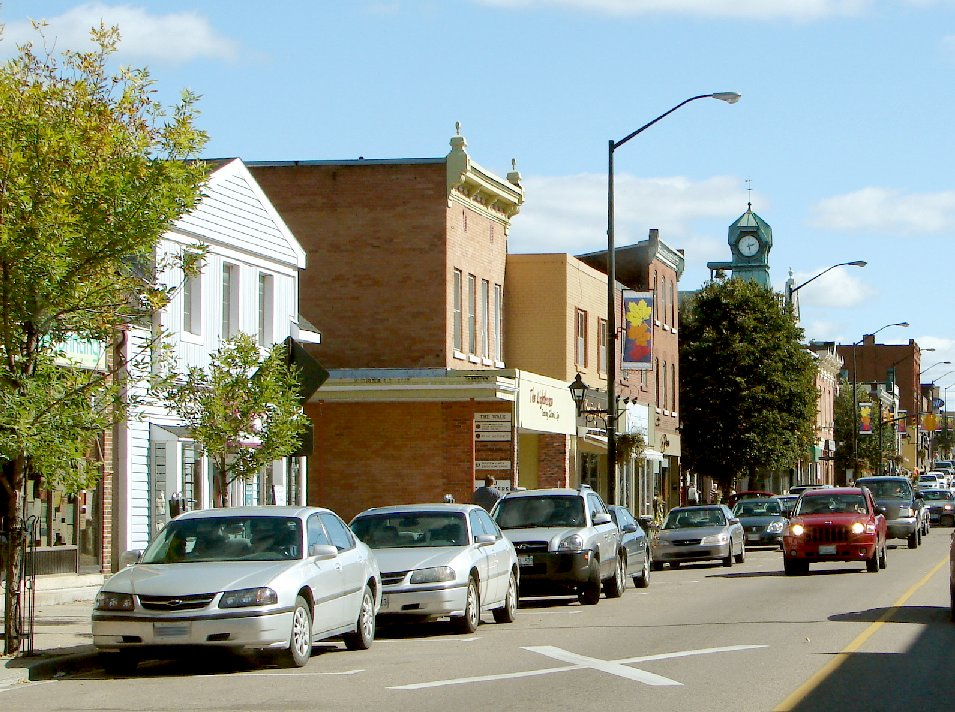
- Raglan Street in the centre of Renfrew

- Coat of arms

- Location within Renfrew County Location within Southern Ontario Location within Ontario Location within Canada Location within North America
- Coordinates: 45°28′18″N 76°40′59″W
- Country: Canada
- Province: Ontario
- County: Renfrew
- Incorporated: July 27, 1858

Government
  - Mayor: Tom Sidney
  - Reeve: Peter Emon

Area
  - Land: 12.81 km^{2} (4.95 sq mi)

Population (2021)
  - Total: 8,190
  - Density: 639.3/km^{2} (1,656/sq mi)
  - Dwellings: 4,117
  - Pop. growth (2016-21): ▼0.4%
- Time zone: UTC-5 (EST)
  - Summer (DST): UTC-4 (EDT)
- Postal code FSA: K7V
- Area codes: 613, 343
- Exchanges: (432, 433, 570 exchange)
- Highways: Highway 17 / TCH; Highway 60; Highway 132
- Website: www.renfrewontario.com

Renfrew is a town on the Bonnechere River in Renfrew County, Ontario, Canada. Located one hour west of Ottawa in Eastern Ontario, Renfrew is the fourth largest town in the county after Petawawa, Pembroke and Arnprior. The town is a small transportation hub connecting Highway 60 and Highway 132 with the Trans-Canada Highway which included the town's main street before the Hwy 17 bypass was built. Renfrew is also known historically for its role in the formation of the National Hockey League. It lies about 5 kilometres from the Quebec border, about 10 kilometres by road. Today a plant in Renfrew makes most of Canada’s hockey tape.

== History ==
Named after Renfrew, Scotland, in approximately 1848, Renfrew was settled largely in part due to logging in the area in the early 19th century, where the river was used in order to drive the lumber to locations such as Ottawa. This heritage was until recently celebrated every July with the Lumber Baron Festival.

== Geography ==
Renfrew and the surrounding Township of Horton are at the intersection of the Bonnechere River and the Ottawa River in the Ottawa Valley. Renfrew is at the intersection of provincial Highway 17, Highway 60, and Highway 132.

The town of Renfrew is the second of five chutes along the Bonnechere River. The others being First Chute Castleford, Third Chute Douglas, Fourth Chute and Fifth Chute Eganville. These chutes were built and used for moving timber past rapids and waterfalls along the Bonnechere.

=== Climate ===
Renfrew has a humid continental climate (Köppen Dfb) with four distinct seasons, warm summers, cold snowy winters and no dry season.

Climate data for Renfrew, Ontario (1971–2000)
Month	Jan	Feb	Mar	Apr	May	Jun	Jul	Aug	Sep	Oct	Nov	Dec	Year
Record high °C (°F)	13.0 (55.4)	12.0 (53.6)	23.9 (75.0)	31.7 (89.1)	34.0 (93.2)	35.0 (95.0)	38.3 (100.9)	37.8 (100.0)	33.0 (91.4)	28.0 (82.4)	21.1 (70.0)	16.0 (60.8)	38.3 (100.9)
Mean daily maximum °C (°F)	−6.4 (20.5)	−4.3 (24.3)	2.2 (36.0)	10.0 (50.0)	19.0 (66.2)	23.7 (74.7)	26.6 (79.9)	25.2 (77.4)	19.5 (67.1)	12.5 (54.5)	4.6 (40.3)	−3.3 (26.1)	10.8 (51.4)
Daily mean °C (°F)	−12 (10)	−10.4 (13.3)	−3.6 (25.5)	4.9 (40.8)	12.2 (54.0)	16.9 (62.4)	19.7 (67.5)	18.5 (65.3)	13.4 (56.1)	7.1 (44.8)	0.3 (32.5)	−8.3 (17.1)	4.9 (40.8)
Mean daily minimum °C (°F)	−17.6 (0.3)	−16.5 (2.3)	−9.4 (15.1)	−1.1 (30.0)	5.4 (41.7)	10.1 (50.2)	12.8 (55.0)	11.8 (53.2)	7.3 (45.1)	1.7 (35.1)	−4 (25)	−13.2 (8.2)	−1.1 (30.0)
Record low °C (°F)	−42.5 (−44.5)	−38 (−36)	−35 (−31)	−21 (−6)	−9 (16)	−2.5 (27.5)	0 (32)	−1.5 (29.3)	−6 (21)	−12 (10)	−29 (−20)	−38 (−36)	−42.5 (−44.5)
Average precipitation mm (inches)	60.6 (2.39)	50.6 (1.99)	60.5 (2.38)	67.5 (2.66)	69.5 (2.74)	74.9 (2.95)	77.0 (3.03)	79.9 (3.15)	70.0 (2.76)	72.3 (2.85)	63.5 (2.50)	65.3 (2.57)	811.5 (31.95)
Average rainfall mm (inches)	15.4 (0.61)	12.2 (0.48)	32.0 (1.26)	57.3 (2.26)	68.5 (2.70)	74.9 (2.95)	77.0 (3.03)	79.9 (3.15)	70.0 (2.76)	68.2 (2.69)	43.9 (1.73)	16.7 (0.66)	616 (24.3)
Average snowfall cm (inches)	45.2 (17.8)	38.4 (15.1)	28.5 (11.2)	10.3 (4.1)	1.0 (0.4)	0 (0)	0 (0)	0 (0)	0 (0)	4.1 (1.6)	19.5 (7.7)	48.6 (19.1)	195.5 (77.0)
Average precipitation days (≥ 0.2 mm)	13.7	10.1	11.0	11.9	13.5	12.9	11.8	12.7	13.7	14.0	13.3	13.1	151.7
Average rainy days (≥ 0.2 mm)	2.4	2.0	5.4	10.0	13.4	12.9	11.8	12.7	13.7	13.3	9.4	3.4	110.4
Average snowy days (≥ 0.2 cm)	11.9	8.7	6.7	2.4	0.19	0	0	0	0	0.96	4.8	10.5	46.15
Source: Environment Canada

== Demographics ==
In the 2021 Census of Population conducted by Statistics Canada, Renfrew had a population of 8,190 living in 3,954 of its 4,117 total private dwellings, a change of −0.4% from its 2016 population of 8,223. With a land area of 12.81 km^{2} (4.95 sq mi), it had a population density of 639.3/km^{2} (1,655.9/sq mi) in 2021.

Canada census – Renfrew community profile

	2021	2016	2011
Population	8,190 (-0.4% from 2016)	8,223 (0.1% from 2011)	8,218 (4.7% from 2006)
Land area	12.81 km^{2} (4.95 sq mi)	12.78 km^{2} (4.93 sq mi)	12.77 km^{2} (4.93 sq mi)
Population density	639.3/km^{2} (1,656/sq mi)	643.4/km^{2} (1,666/sq mi)	643.5/km^{2} (1,667/sq mi)
Median age	54.0 (M: 51.2, F: 56.4)	51.9 (M: 49.5, F: 53.8)
Private dwellings	4,117 (total) 3,954 (occupied)	4,035 (total) 3,875 (occupied)	3,980 (total)
Median household income	$60,400	$48,427

References: 2021 2016 2011

Mother tongue (2021):

- English: 93.4%
- French: 2.8%
- English and French: 0.7%
- Other: 2.6%

Historical populations

Year	Pop.	±%
1901	3,153	—
1911	3,846	+22.0%
1921	4,906	+27.6%
1931	5,296	+7.9%
1941	5,511	+4.1%
1951	7,360	+33.6%
1956	8,634	+17.3%

Year	Pop.	±%
1961	8,935	+3.5%
1966	9,502	+6.3%
1971	9,173	−3.5%
1976	8,617	−6.1%
1981	8,283	−3.9%
1986	8,314	+0.4%
1991	8,134	−2.2%

Year	Pop.	±%
1996	8,125	−0.1%
2001	7,942	−2.3%
2006	7,846	−1.2%
2011	8,218	+4.7%
2016	8,223	+0.1%
2021	8,190	−0.4%

Population counts are not adjusted for boundary changes (Renfrew annexed part of Horton Twp. on January 1, 1971).

== Economy ==
Much of Renfrew's current prosperity can be attributed to its status as an economic centre for a surrounding rural region with a population of over 30,000. Renfrew is also an important stop for Ottawa-based cottagers and outdoor enthusiasts passing by on their way to nearby whitewater rafting, boating, camping, hunting, golfing, fishing, snowmobiling, down-hill skiing, and cross-country skiing. However, the area's largest single employers are the Renfrew Victoria Hospital and the Bonnechere Manor. In addition to numerous small employers, there are also several manufacturing facilities employing several hundred people; Scapa Tapes Renfrew (formerly Renfrew Tape) makes products such as hockey tape that is used across North America and the duct tape brand featured on the discontinued Red Green Show and promoted by Doug Gilmour in the early 1990s after becoming a member of the Toronto Maple Leafs. Times Fibre Canada and Madawaska Hardwood Flooring also have manufacturing facilities in town. Haley Industries located outside Renfrew near Haley Station is also a major employer in the area. Renfrew is also home to many successful small businesses. Between 2000 and 2005, a major portion of Renfrew's retail business, and the associated customer services jobs, shifted from the west-end Renfrew mall (now demolished) to its east-end industrial park near Highway 17 due to the opening of several major big-box such as No Frills and Walmart and smaller retail stores.

Residents of the area await the twinning of Highway 17 to improve traffic flow and the safety of the highway due to numerous accidents along the corridor to North Bay, Ontario.

Despite the apparent prosperity, Statistics Canada reported the average earnings of Renfrew residents in 2000 as $35,811, or roughly 31% lower than the provincial average and 5% lower than the county average. Further, the town reports, relative to the population size and compared to the province as a whole, fewer positions in management, business, finance, administration and natural or applied sciences, while there was greater than the provincial rates of occupation in sales and service, trades, transport and equipment operators, processing, manufacturing and utilities.

== Festivals ==
- Renfrew was the annual host and sponsor of the Ottawa Valley Lumber Baron Festival, a celebration of the town's roots in the logging industry. The Lumber Baron Festival is now known as Valleyfest, dropping its historical roots.
- The Renfrew Fair has been drawing mixed crowds for decades with its mid-way rides, exhibits, demolition derby, musical acts and livestock showcase. The fair takes place on the second weekend of every September and lasts from Wednesday afternoon through Sunday afternoon. The rides are supplied by the company Bungsey Shows.
- There is a nearby Blue Grass music festival that takes place every year in the middle of July.
- In 2008, Renfrew celebrated its sesquicentennial throughout the calendar year.

== Landmarks ==
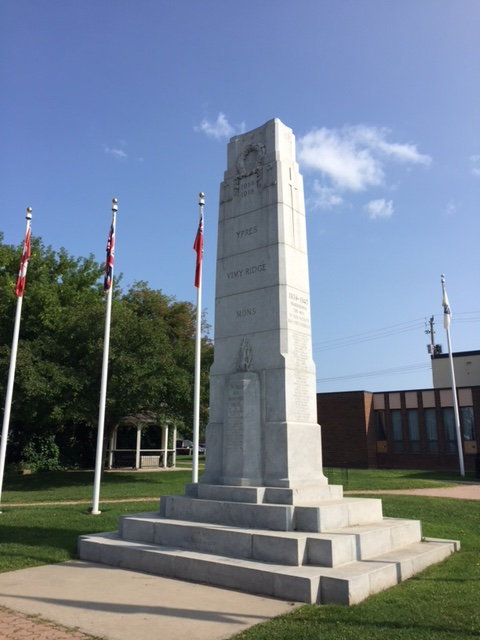
Cenotaph located in Low Square

=== Low Square ===
Low Square is located at the corner of Raglan Street and Railway Avenue in downtown Renfrew. The square is a park setting containing the cenotaph, and the Town Hall. In 1918, with approval of Council, and at his own expense, the Honourable Thomas Low donated and landscaped the property as a gift to the town for the purpose of constructing a cenotaph to honour local soldiers who died in The Great War, but he died before it was unveiled. The Renfrew Police station (later the OPP detachment) was built as a small brown brick building on the back of the square officially opening October 15, 1970, replacing the station directly to the south of it (formerly the Albion Hotel). A new town hall was constructed as an addition to the police station, in 1985, with municipal offices moving from the old Temperance Hall building directly across the street. In February 2017, the full building became town hall offices and Ontario Court of Justice offices when the police moved to a new location at 450 O'Brien Road. The name of Tom Low lives on in the Park he landscaped, which A.A. Wright declared "from this time on and for all time to be known as Low Square”.

=== McDougall Mill Museum ===
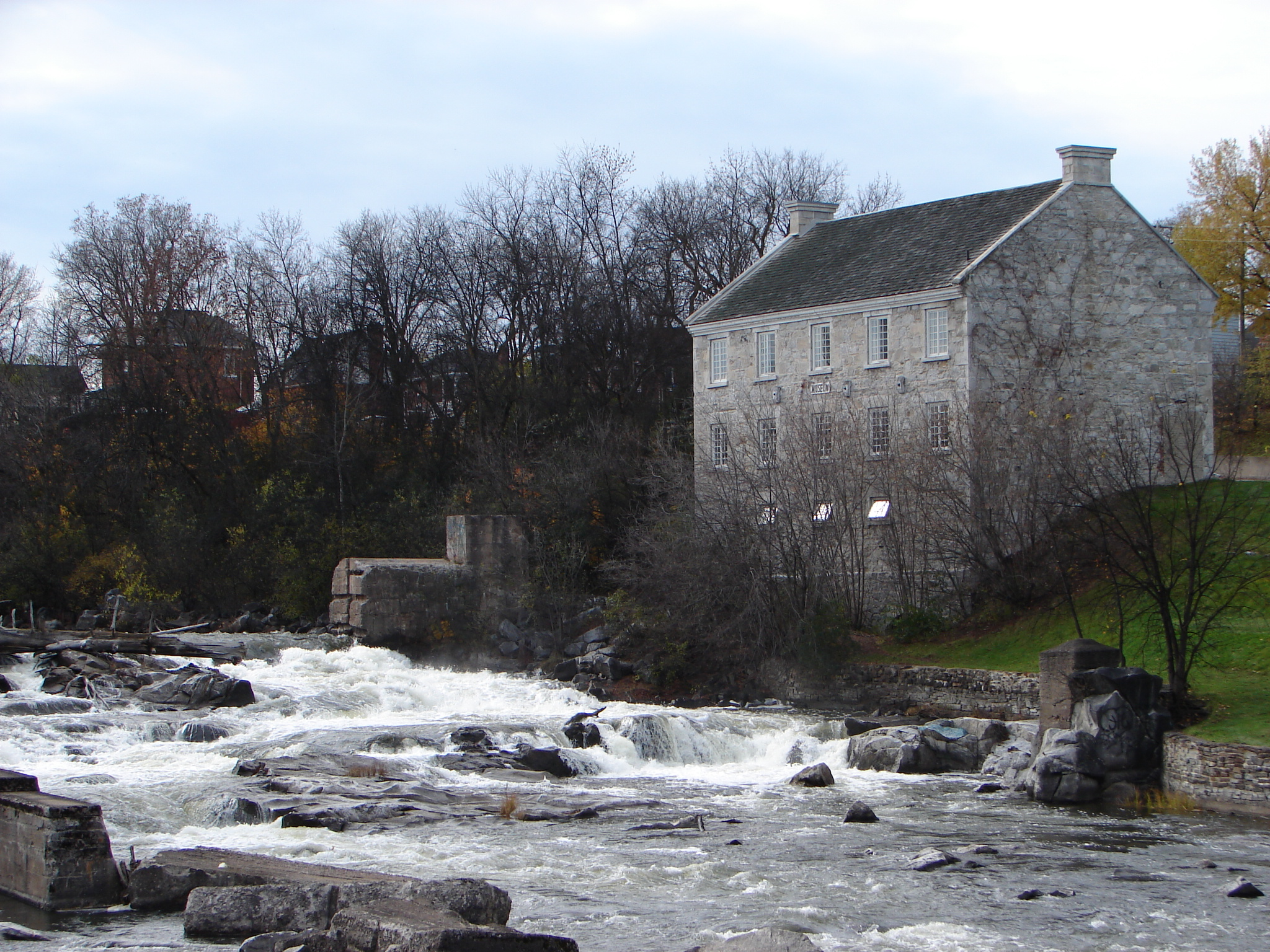
The McDougall Mill Museum on the Bonnechere River

John Lorn McDougall, politician and fur trader, built the mill in 1855 by the Bonnechere River near the town landmark Swinging Bridge and overlooking natural rapids below the Renfrew Power Generation generating station. It has been converted into a museum, sometimes referred to as 'Renfrew Museum', not to be confused with museums of that name in Pennsylvania and Scotland. The McDougall Mill Museum houses pioneer tools and machinery, a military section, a doll exhibit, as well as toys, Victorian clothing and household items.

=== Swinging Bridge ===
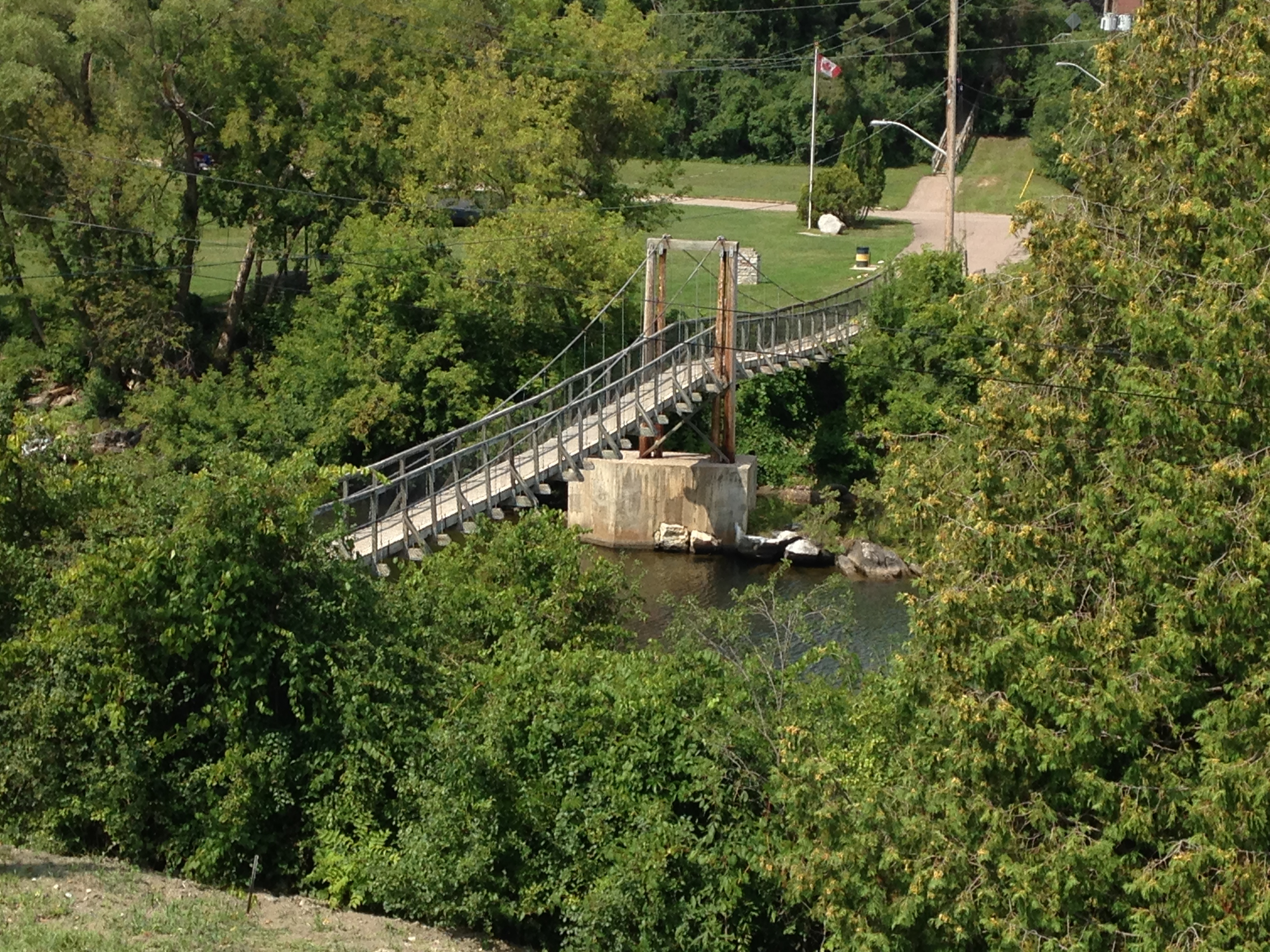
Swinging Bridge over the Bonnechere River, Renfrew, Ontario

In 1885, the W.H. Kearney family built a wire bridge across the Bonnechere River. The “swinging bridge”, now a town landmark made of wood and cable, is far safer and more secure than the original plank and wire structure. Reconstructed in 1983 by the Town of Renfrew and updated in 2015, it is one of three swinging bridges in Canada and provides an excellent view of the Bonnechere River and the power generation plant.

=== Entertainment ===
- The O'Brien Theatre opened on June 25, 1930, and was owned and operated by Ottawa Valley Amusements, Renfrew entrepreneur M. J. O'Brien. The opening movie, Sally, was a comedy starring Marilyn Miller. Admission for adults was 45 cents and for children it was 20 cents. The elegantly decorated town landmark was converted from a live theatre to a movie theatre and 1990s upgrades modified the balcony to accommodate a second screen. The building still maintaining much of the original appeal, reopened after extensive renovations, on January 7, 1994 with Mrs. Doubtfire, starring Robin Williams.

== Services ==
=== Churches ===
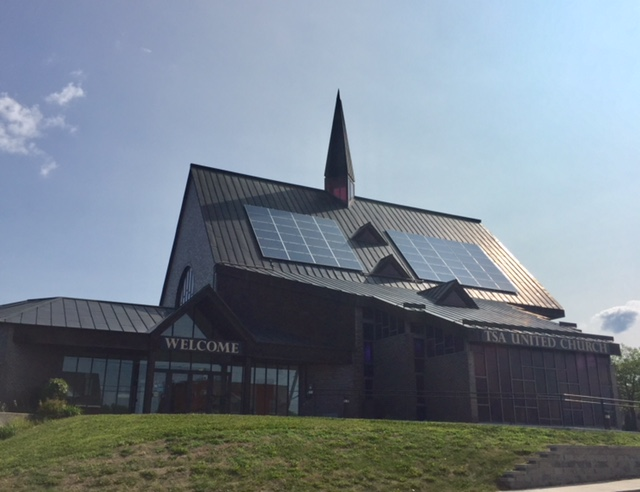
Trinity St. Andrew's United Church

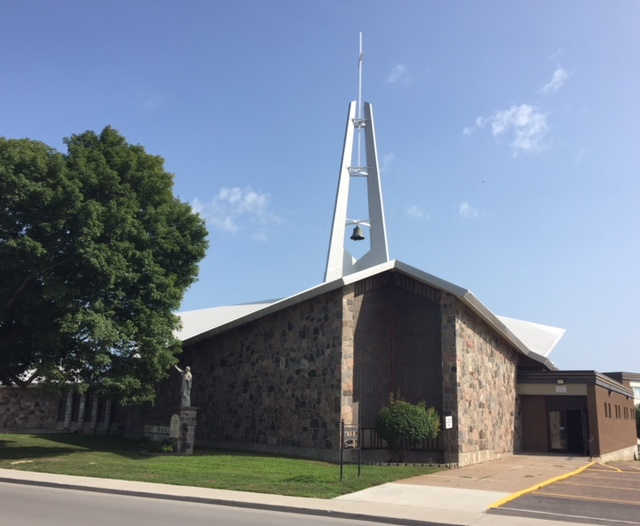
St. Francis Xavier Catholic Church

- Calvary Pentecostal Church
- Christian Reformed Church
- Our Lady of Fatima Parish
- Parkview Free Methodist Church
- Renfrew Baptist Church
- Renfrew & District Ministerial Association
- Renfrew Presbyterian Church
- Salvation Army
- St. Francis Xavier Roman Catholic Church
- St. James Lutheran Church
- St. Paul's Anglican Church
- Trinity St. Andrew's United Church

=== Health Care Facilities ===
- Bonnechere Manor
- Chartwell Quail Creek Retirement Residence
- Hospice Renfrew Inc.
- Miramichi Lodge
- Renfrew Victoria Hospital opened in 1897, having 12 beds for contagious disease. By 1912, bed capacity rose to 30 and the Renfrew Victoria Hospital became a Public General Hospital. In January 1926, a tragic fire destroyed the original building, which was replaced by a new 50 bed hospital later that year. The Hospital was under Municipal ownership until 1961 when a special act of parliament transferred it from civic authority to an independent corporation known as the Board of Governors, composed of representatives from the Town of Renfrew and surrounding Townships. In October 1963, the hospital grew to 101 treatment beds after a major building and renovation program. In November 1978 another renovation project took place which was completed in April 1980. A new Dialysis Unit serving Renfrew County was completed in 1994, able to accommodate the needs of 48 patients. This Unit was again expanded in 1999 with an addition to the Hospital. In November 2001, a new Emergency/Ambulatory Care wing was opened, adding 13,000 square feet to the existing hospital, then in March 2015 a 23,000 square foot Nephrology Centre was completed. This consolidated every aspect of patient's care for kidneys - education, clinics and treatment - in the same area of the hospital.

The Victoria Hospital School of Nursing opened in 1902 with a capacity of 30 students, graduating 10 students per year. Nursing education moved under the jurisdiction of community colleges and the school was subsequently closed in 1965.

=== Policing ===
The Town of Renfrew is policed by the Ontario Provincial Police force.

Chief Bernard "Barney" McDermott had the job as Chief of Police in Renfrew from 1890 until his retirement in 1909 - he was a one man police force and was known to always "get his man". His living quarters were situated above the fire hall in Renfrew.

The Renfrew Police station (later the OPP detachment) was built on the back of Low Square in 1972.

The OPP operated out of their Stewart Street location from 1967 until moving into the Low Square detachment when the Town of Renfrew police service amalgamated with the OPP in 2000. The Renfrew and Arnprior detachments, who both faced the same fate of losing their own town operated forces, had their OPP detachments amalgamated in January 2013, and in February 2017, a new regional detachment was opened at 450 O'Brien Road in Renfrew. This new Renfrew detachment serves the towns of Arnprior, Renfrew, and the townships of Greater Madawaska, McNab-Braeside, Admaston-Bromley, Horton and about half of Whitewater Region Township.

=== Post Office ===
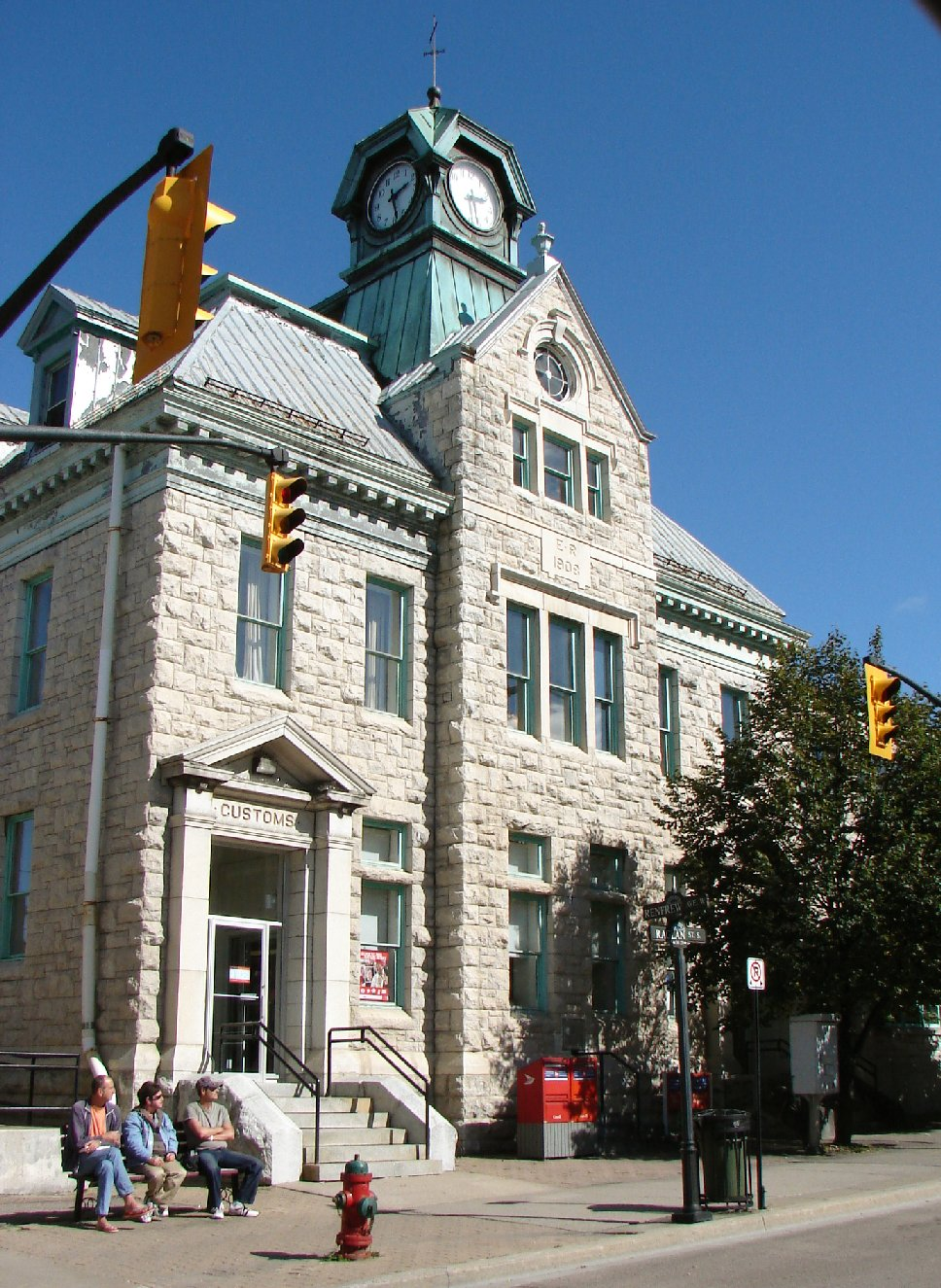
Renfrew's Historic Post Office and Customs & Revenue Building

The Renfrew Post Office, built in 1908, is located at 249 Raglan Street South. Built in the Romanesque Revival style with exterior walls of irregularly coursed split-faced stone and mansard roof clad in seamed copper, this beautiful edifice is a major landmark on Renfrew's main throughfare. The tapered silhouette of the metal-clad clock tower, hipped gable roof and weather vane tops the stone structure that has twinned principal entrances with metal coats of arms located above. Located below the top centre window is the engraving E.R. 1908, representing the monarch at the time of construction. The interior consists of hardwood finishes, terrazzo tile floors, plaster ceilings and walls with wood dados. Over the years, the building has shared use of the post office, customs and revenue offices, and the NHA/NHL Birthplace Museum. In 2018, the building was sold by the town to Rob Thompson Hotels Ltd. for the price tag of $100,000 with the proposal of a boutique hotel in the upper levels of the building, while retaining the post office on the main level and numerous conditions to keep the historical features intact.

=== Public Library ===
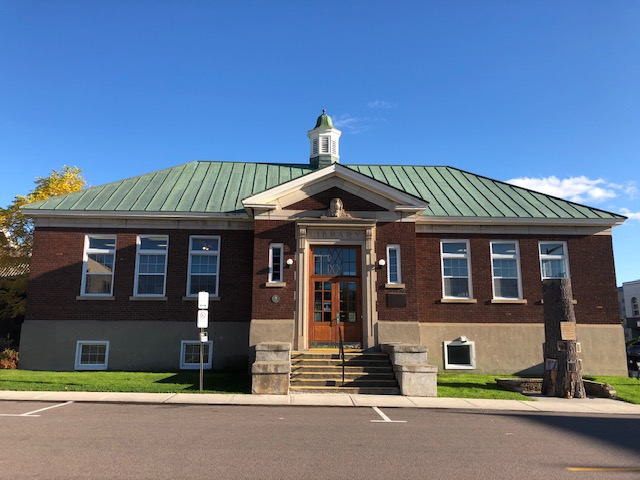
Renfrew Public Library

The Renfrew Public Library had rather simple beginnings; a group of residents discussing the latest philosophies and varied topics in William Dickson's cobbler shop which opened up in 1845 near the current location of the post office. After gathering up a few books in 1852, Mr. Dickson, Mr. Archie Thompson, and local lawyer, Mr. Elkanah Billings formed the Renfrew Mechanics Institute and Library Association, which lasted for about fifteen years before being revitalized in 1870 by a new group of people. By the end of the century, the Institute emerged as a newly formed Public Library Board and the books were moved to the Barnet Block at 282 Raglan Street, above what was James Clark's drugstore. The current building located at 13 Railway Avenue, was opened in 1920 with financial support from the Carnegie Institute, and in 1959, the Children's Library was established in the completely renovated basement. In the 1980s, the library became wheelchair accessible by an addition at the east and south side of the building, which also expanded the research and reading area into the second floor of the adjacent building at 161 Raglan Street.

== Sports ==
=== Facilities ===
The town's main sports complex, Ma-te-way Centre was built in 1989 replacing the aging Renfrew Arena.

=== Golf ===
The Renfrew Golf Club was founded in 1929, as nine holes, and was expanded to 18 holes in the mid-1970s.

=== Hockey ===
One of the four original teams in the National Hockey Association, the precursor to the NHL, was based in Renfrew. The Renfrew Creamery Kings sought to be allowed to play in the Eastern Canada Amateur Hockey Association, but with no success. The team's owner, M. J. O'Brien, eventually financed and put together his own league, the NHA. The Creamery Kings played two seasons of hockey in the NHA, 1911 and 1912, until M. J. O'Brien pulled out to pursue his interests in the railway.

Renfrew Timberwolves is one of the town's hockey teams since 1987, but the team can trace its roots back to 1968 as the Renfrew Lions or Renfrew Junior Timberwolves. The current team plays in the Eastern Ontario Junior Hockey League. The Renfrew Wolves are also one of the town's hockey teams playing in the Central Canada Hockey League since moving from Kanata in 2021.

== Education ==
=== Renfrew County Catholic District School Board ===
Primary Schools (Grade K-7)

- St. Thomas The Apostle Catholic School - Located at 41 Bolger Lane.
- Our Lady of Fatima Catholic School - Located at 228 Mason Avenue.

Secondary School (Grade 8-12)

- St. Joseph's Catholic High School - Located at 835 First Street.

=== Renfrew County District School Board ===
Primary Schools (Grade K-6)

- Admaston Public School - Built in 1967, this 7 classroom, 1665 square meter school is located on 3.55 hectares of land at 182 Stone Road.
- Central Public School - This 9 classroom school, built in 1960, is located at 140 Munroe Avenue East on 2.43 hectares of land and is 2813 square meters in size.
- Queen Elizabeth Public School - Located at 100 Veterans' Memorial Boulevard on 3 hectares of land, this 3169.1 square meter with 16 classrooms, was built in 1949.

Middle School (Grade 7-8)

- Renfrew Collegiate Intermediate School - Built in 1922 at 184 Bonnechere Street South, this 12,471.1 square meter building on 1.47 hectares of land shares 678 square meters, 9 classrooms, of the building with the Renfrew Collegiate Institute.

Secondary School (Grade 9-12)

- Renfrew Collegiate Institute, located 184 Bonnechere Street South, was built in 1922. On 1.47 hectares of land, this 12,471.1 square meter building shares 19 classrooms and 11,793.1 square meters of the building with the Renfrew Collegiate Intermediate School.

== Media ==
=== Print ===
- The Renfrew Mercury was first published in 1871 by W.E. Smallfield and Sons, who owned the newspaper until 1919. It has passed through several ownerships over the years, operated since October 2005 by Metroland. The group, dubbed Ottawa Region Media Group, publishes 15 community papers in 16 markets.

=== Radio ===
Frequency	Call sign	Branding	Format	Owner	Notes
FM 96.1	CHMY-FM	myFM	Adult contemporary	My Broadcasting Corporation	
FM 98.7	CJHR-FM		Community radio	Valley Heritage Radio	

- (Defunct) - CKOB was a radio station which operated on AM 1400 from 1974 until it was replaced by CHVR-FM Pembroke in 1996.

All other radio stations are available out of Ottawa and the surrounding areas. (See: Ottawa Valley Radio)

=== Television ===
- TVCogeco

== Notable people ==
- Anderson, Lorne, NHL hockey player
- Asselstine, William James, British Columbia MLA
- Brydge, Bill, NHL hockey player
- Coughlin, Ryan, CFL football player
- Courtice, Rody Kenny, Canadian teacher and painter
- Czigány, Kinga-MacAskill, Hungarian Olympic gold medalist in K-4 500m at the 1992 Summer Olympics in Barcelona
- Davies, Robertson, famous Canadian writer of Fifth Business, who spent his early years (from age 5 onwards) growing up in Renfrew. His family had moved to the town from Thamesville, Ontario, and later moved to Kingston, Ontario. His novel “What’s Bred in the Bone” was based on the town.
- Davies, W.H., famous Welsh "tramp-poet"
- Fraser, Jack, NHA player.
- Hough, Christine
- Hughes, Billy, CFL player
- Kearney, Garnet, doctor
- Lindsay, "Terrible" Ted, NHL hockey player, Hockey Hall of Fame inductee
- Low, Hon. Thomas A., Canadian Member of Parliament and Senator.
- McAndrew, John Alfred, Ontario MPP
- McCallum, Joseph S., Alberta MLA
- McDougall Sr., John Lorn, fur trader, grist mill operator (McDougall Mill Museum) and member of the Legislative Assembly of the Province of Canada.
- McNamara, William J., Alberta politician
- McVicar, Jack, NHL player.
- O'Brien, Ambrose, NHA player
- O'Brien, Andy, sports journalist
- O'Brien, M.J., businessman and Canadian Senator.
- Peplinski, Jim, NHL hockey player
- Stewart, John Alexander, Canadian MP
- Whitton, Charlotte, later mayor of Ottawa, Ontario
- Williams, John Ralston, physician

== See also ==
- Michael John O'Brien
- Renfrew Millionaires
- List of townships in Ontario
