= Sleepy girl mocktail =

Drink popularised by TikTok

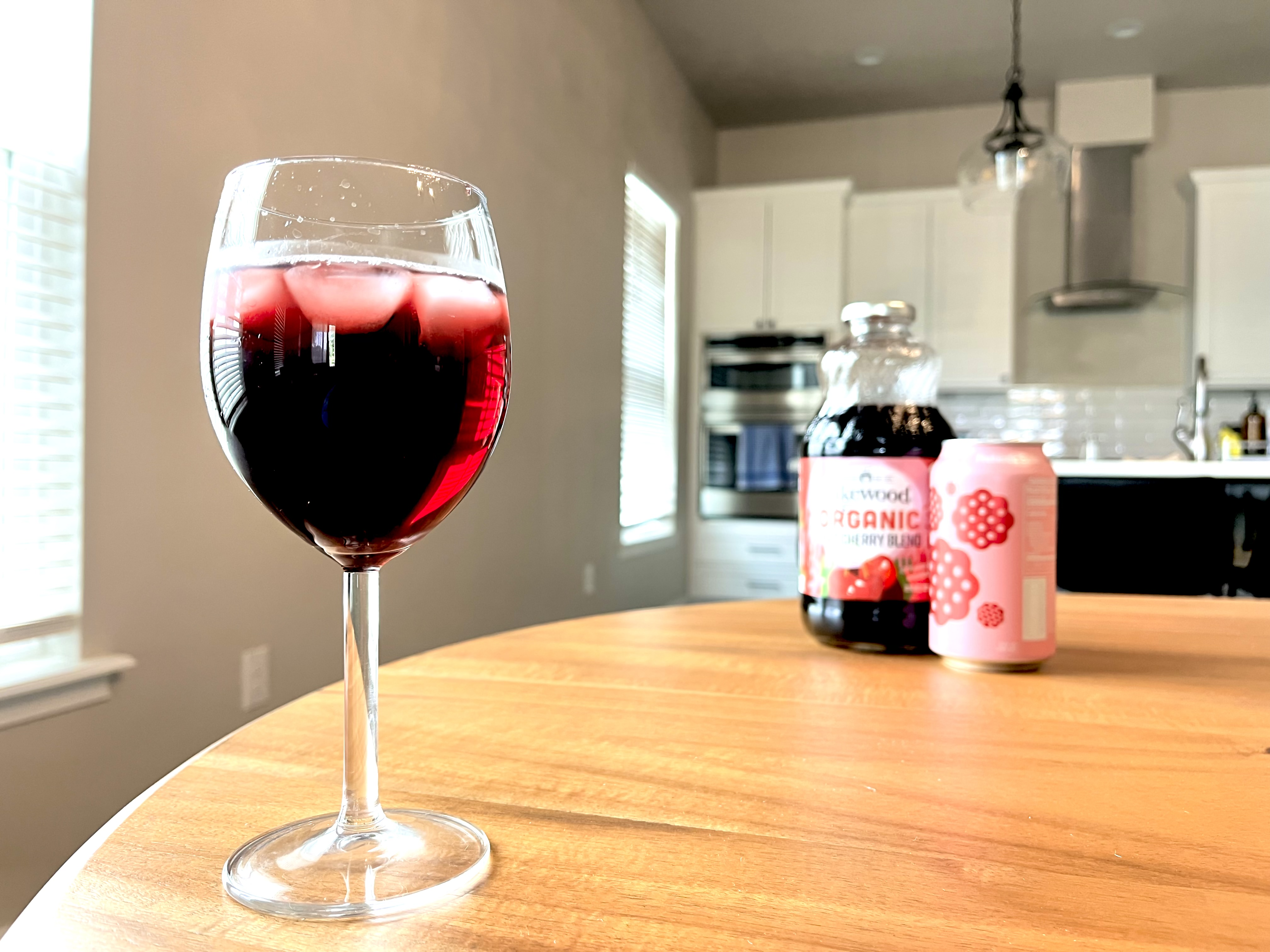
- Sleepy girl mocktail
- Type: Homemade beverage
- Ingredients: Tart cherry juice, Magnesium powder, Seltzer or lemon-lime soda

Sleepy girl mocktail is a viral homemade beverage that gained popularity on TikTok as a sleep aid. The first propagator of the drink is reported to be Calee Shea who posted about it in January 2023, but Gracie Norton, a content creator on TikTok, popularized the drink with her post. The drink became viral that year. The drink surged in popularity in January 2024, as "Dry January" prompted numerous individuals to seek mocktail recipes online.

== Ingredients ==
The primary ingredients of sleepy girl mocktail include:

- Tart cherry juice: Claimed to possess potential sleep-inducing properties due to its relatively high melatonin content. Studies on its effectiveness are limited, with melatonin levels lower than typical sleep-inducing supplements. Other nutrients in the juice like tryptophan and polyphenol antioxidants may also play a role in promoting sleep.
- Magnesium powder: Touted for sleep benefits, but conclusive evidence supporting its positive impact is lacking. Some studies suggest potential benefits for individuals with restless leg syndrome. It may be of particular benefit to those with magnesium deficiency, a common condition that is correlated with anxiety and depression. Most magnesium found in retail stores is magnesium oxide, which is not well-absorbed. Thus, magnesium glycinate is the preferred option. However, there is a risk of magnesium toxicity if too much magnesium is ingested.
- Seltzer or lemon-lime soda: Fizzing agents enhancing the texture and flavor of the mocktail. Recipes often call for prebiotic soda, such as Olipop. Drinks with lower sugar content are recommended, as higher blood sugar levels can negatively impact sleep. However, it is possible that the carbonation may lead to feelings of bloating and abdominal discomfort, negatively impacting sleep.

== Preparation ==
First, any glass of one's choice is filled with ice. Then, the tart cherry juice is then added. Next, the magnesium powder is dissolved in the juice. Finally, the soda or seltzer is used to top off the drink. Alcohol is notably excluded from the recipe, even though it is a depressant, because it can lead to worse quality of sleep.

== Scientific evidence ==
Scientific evidence supporting the efficacy of sleepy girl mocktail's ingredients remains inconclusive, with the placebo effect potentially playing a significant role in any perceived sleep-related benefits. The ritual of preparing and consuming the sleepy girl mocktail may contribute to a perceived enhancement in sleep quality.

Tart cherry juice, according to a 2011 study in the European Journal of Nutrition, may boost melatonin production and promote relaxation. A more recent study from July 2023 in Current Sleep Medicine Reports suggested potential improvements in total sleep time and efficiency with tart cherry juice, but further research is needed to confirm these findings.

The magnesium may promote physical and mental relaxation which may in effect promote sleep.

== See also ==
- TikTok food trends
