= Magnesium (medication) =

Pharmaceutical preparation

Magnesium INN: Magnesium ion
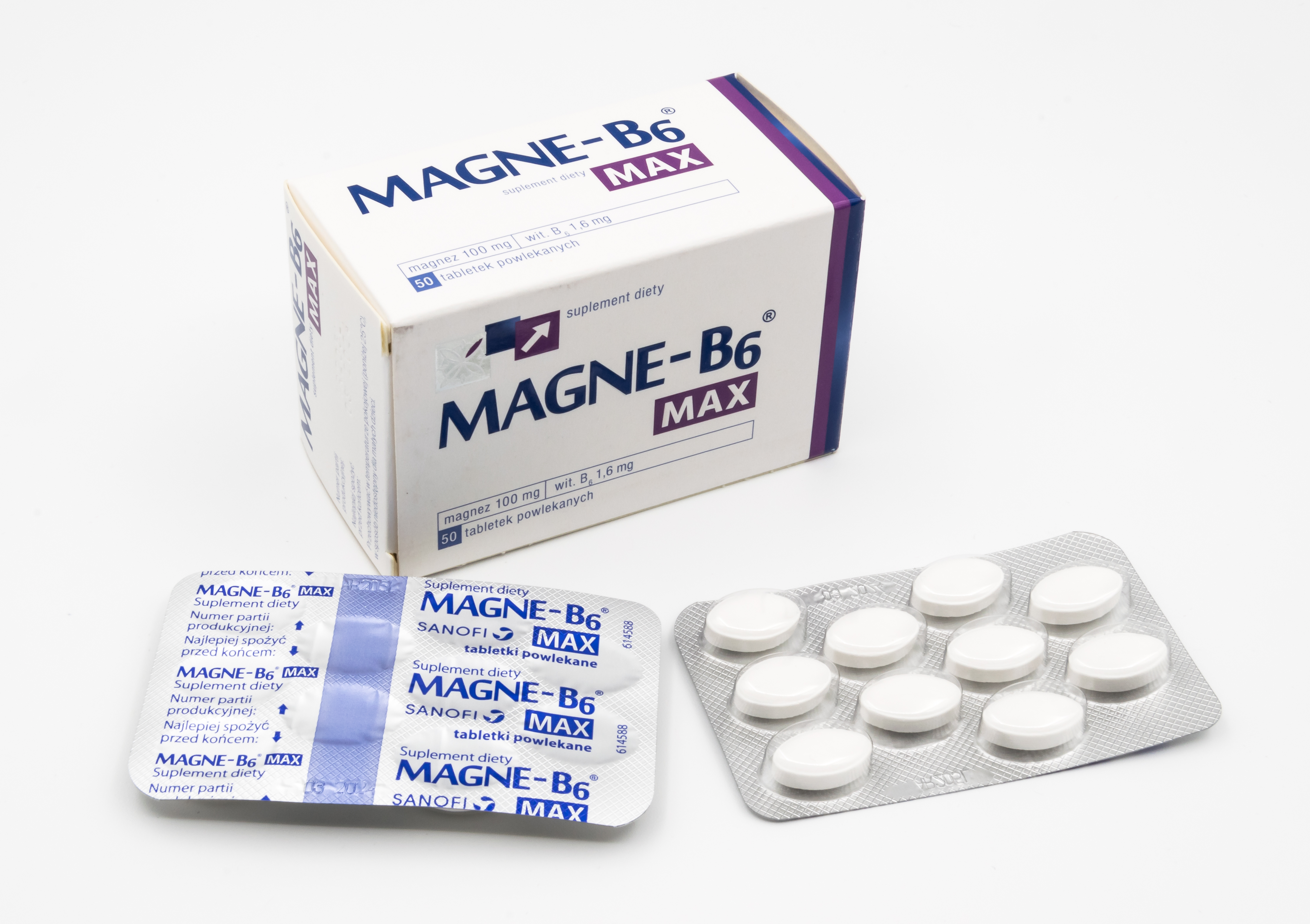

Clinical data
- Routes of administration: By mouth, injection, topical
- ATC code: A12CC (WHO)

Identifiers
- CAS Number: 7439-95-4
- PubChem CID: 888
- ChemSpider: 865
- UNII: I38ZP9992A

Chemical and physical data
- Formula: Mg^{+2}
- Molar mass: 24.305 g·mol^{−1}

Magnesium salts are available as a medication in a number of formulations. They are used to treat magnesium deficiency, low blood magnesium, eclampsia, and several other conditions. Magnesium is an essential nutrient.

Usually in lower dosages, magnesium is commonly included in dietary mineral preparations, including many multivitamin preparations. Chelated magnesium is sometimes used to aid in absorption.

In 2023, it was the 313th most commonly prescribed medication in the United States, with more than 200,000 prescriptions and magnesium salts were the 174th most commonly prescribed medication, with more than 2 million prescriptions.

== Medical uses ==
- As a bronchodilator after beta-agonist and anticholinergic agents have been tried, e.g., in severe exacerbations of asthma.
- Obstetrics: Magnesium sulfate is used to prevent seizures in women with preeclampsia and eclampsia, and is also used for fetal neuroprotection in preterm deliveries, but has been shown to be an ineffective tocolytic agent.

== Side effects ==
More common side effects from magnesium include upset stomach and diarrhea, and calcium deficiency if calcium levels are already low.

== Overdose ==
Overdose of magnesium (hypermagnesemia) is possible only in special circumstances. It can cause diarrhea, nausea, vomiting, severely lowered blood pressure, confusion, slowed heart rate, respiratory paralysis. In very severe cases, it can cause coma, cardiac arrhythmia, cardiac arrest and death.

Magnesium overdose can be counteracted by administering calcium gluconate.

== Types of preparations ==
- Magnesium deficiency treatment:
  - Oral
    - Magnesium aspartate
    - Magnesium carbonate
    - Magnesium chloride
    - Magnesium gluconate
    - Magnesium glycinate
    - Magnesium lactate
    - Magnesium orotate
    - Magnesium oxide
    - Magnesium pidolate
  - Injected
    - Magnesium sulfate
- Laxative
  - Magnesium carbonate
  - Magnesium citrate
  - Magnesium hydroxide
  - Magnesium oxide
  - Magnesium sulfate
- Miscellaneous
  - Magnesium asparaginate
  - Magnesium oxide: Antacid, heartburn, and indigestion. Treatment of dyspepsia.
  - Magnesium carbonate: Antacid
  - Magnesium hydroxide: Antacid
- Multiple applications
  - Magnesium sulfate: It is on the World Health Organization's List of Essential Medicines

In practice, magnesium is given in a salt form together with any of several anionic compounds serving as counter-ions, such as chloride or sulfate. Nevertheless, magnesium is generally presumed to be the active component. An exception is the administration of magnesium sulfate in barium chloride poisoning, where sulfate binds to barium to form insoluble barium sulfate.

Magnesium is absorbed orally at about 30% bioavailability from any water soluble salt, such as magnesium chloride or magnesium citrate. The citrate is the least expensive soluble (high bioavailability) oral magnesium salt available in supplements, with 100 mg and 200 mg magnesium typically contained per capsule, tablet or 50 mg/mL in solution.

Magnesium aspartate, chloride, lactate, citrate and glycinate each have bioavailability 4 times greater than the oxide form and are equivalent to each other per amount of magnesium, though not in price.

The ligand of choice for large-scale manufacturers of multivitamins and minerals containing magnesium is the magnesium oxide due to its compactness, high magnesium content by weight, low cost, and ease-of-use in manufacturing. However it is insoluble in water. Insoluble magnesium salts such as magnesium oxide or magnesium hydroxide (milk of magnesia) depend on stomach acid for neutralization before they can be absorbed, and thus are relatively poor oral magnesium sources, on average.

Magnesium sulfate (Epsom salts) is soluble in water. It is commonly used as a laxative, owing to the poor absorption of the sulfate component. In lower doses, they may be used as an oral magnesium source, however.

Intravenous or intramuscular magnesium is generally in the form of magnesium sulfate solution. Intravenous or intramuscular magnesium is completely bioavailable, and effective. It is used in severe hypomagnesemia and eclampsia.
