= Magnesium taurate =

Names
- Preferred IUPAC name Magnesium bis(2-aminoethane-1-sulfonate)
- Other names Magnesium ditaurate

Identifiers
CAS Number	334824-43-0
3D model (JSmol)	Interactive image
ChemSpider	16432063
PubChem CID	13343447
UNII	RCM1N3D968
CompTox Dashboard (EPA)	DTXSID201022013
- InChI: InChI=1S/2C2H7NO3S.Mg/c2*3-1-2-7(4,5)6;/h2*1-3H2,(H,4,5,6);/q;;+2/p-2 Key: YZURQOBSFRVSEB-UHFFFAOYSA-L
- SMILES: C(CS(=O)(=O)[O-])N.C(CS(=O)(=O)[O-])N.[Mg+2]

Properties
Chemical formula	C_{4}H_{12}MgN_{2}O_{6}S_{2}
Molar mass	272.57 g·mol^{−1}
- Except where otherwise noted, data are given for materials in their standard state (at 25 °C [77 °F], 100 kPa). (what is ?) Infobox references

Magnesium taurate, also known as magnesium ditaurate or magnesium taurinate, is the magnesium salt of taurine, and a mineral supplement.

It contains approximately 8.9% elemental magnesium by mass. Accordingly, 100 mg of magnesium is contained in 1121 mg of magnesium taurate.

== Safety ==
Due to the expected dissociation of magnesium taurate in the body before absorption, safety data on magnesium and taurine can be used to evaluate the safety of magnesium taurate.

Taurine has an observed safe level of supplemental intake in normal healthy adults at up to 3 g/day. Using the same level as an approximation for taurate yields a limit of 3.3 g/day for magnesium taurate, or alternatively 300 mg/day for elemental magnesium as taurate.

== See also ==
- Magnesium (pharmaceutical preparation)
- Magnesium deficiency (medicine)
- Magnesium in biology
