= Magnesium citrate =

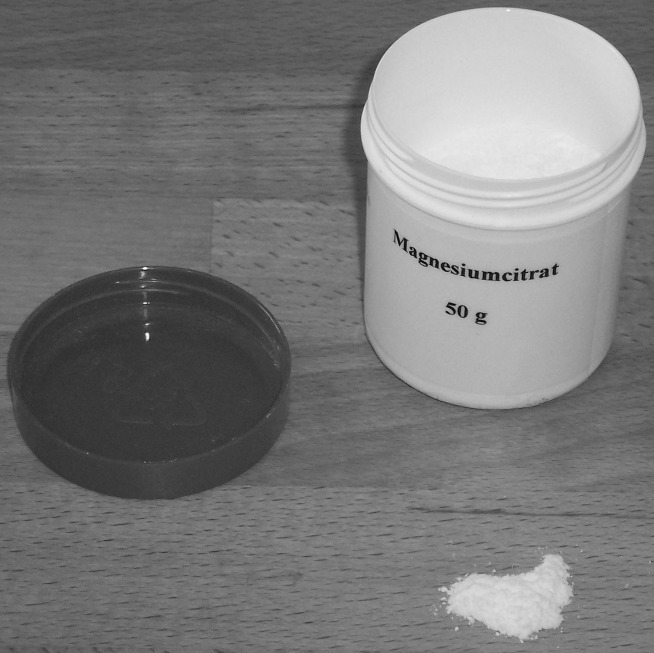

Names
- IUPAC name Magnesium 2-hydroxypropane-1,2,3-tricarboxylate

Identifiers
CAS Number	7779-25-1
3D model (JSmol)	Interactive image
ChEBI	CHEBI:131389
ChEMBL	ChEMBL2105061
ChemSpider	8605
ECHA InfoCard	100.121.319
EC Number	231-923-9
E number	E345 (antioxidants, ...)
PubChem CID	24511
UNII	RHO26O1T9V
CompTox Dashboard (EPA)	DTXSID301014966
- InChI: InChI=1S/2C6H8O7.3Mg/c2*7-3(8)1-6(13,5(11)12)2-4(9)10;;;/h2*13H,1-2H2,(H,7,8)(H,9,10)(H,11,12);;;/q;;3*+2/p-6 Key: PLSARIKBYIPYPF-UHFFFAOYSA-H
- SMILES: C(C(=O)O)C(CC(=O)[O-])(C(=O)[O-])O.[Mg+2]

Properties
Chemical formula	MgHC_{6}H_{5}O_{7}
Molar mass	214.412 g·mol^{−1}
Solubility in water	20 g/100ml

Pharmacology
ATC code	A06AD19 (WHO) A12CC04 (WHO), B05CB03 (WHO)

Related compounds
Related salts	Magnesium citrate (3:2)
- Except where otherwise noted, data are given for materials in their standard state (at 25 °C [77 °F], 100 kPa). verify (what is ?) Infobox references

Magnesium citrates are metal-organic compounds formed from citrate and magnesium ions. They are salts. One form is the 1:1 magnesium preparation in salt form with citric acid in a 1:1 ratio (1 magnesium atom per citrate molecule). It contains 11.33% magnesium by weight. Magnesium citrate (sensu lato) is used medicinally as a saline laxative and to empty the bowel before major surgery or a colonoscopy. It is available without a prescription, both as a generic and under various brand names. It is also used in the pill form as a magnesium dietary supplement. As a food additive, magnesium citrate is used to regulate acidity and is known as E number E345.

== Structures ==
The structures of solid magnesium citrates have been characterized by X-ray crystallography. In the 1:1 salt, only one carboxylate of citrate is deprotonated. It has the formula Mg(H_{2}C_{6}H_{5}O_{7})_{2}. The other form of magnesium citrate has the formula Mg(HC_{6}H_{5}O_{7})(H_{2}O)_{2}, consisting of the citrate dianion (two of citric acid's carboxyl groups are deprotonated). Thus, it is clear that name "magnesium citrate" is ambiguous and sometimes may refer to other salts such as trimagnesium dicitrate which has a magnesium:citrate ratio of 3:2, or monomagnesium dicitrate with a ratio of 1:2, or a mix of two or three of the salts of magnesium and citric acid.

== Mechanism of action ==
Magnesium citrate works by attracting water through the tissues by a process known as osmosis. Once in the intestine, it can attract enough water into the intestine to induce defecation. The additional water stimulates bowel motility. This means it can also be used to treat rectal and colon problems. Magnesium citrate functions best on an empty stomach, and should always be followed with a full (eight-ounce or 250 ml) glass of water or juice to help counteract water loss and aid in absorption. Magnesium citrate solutions generally produce bowel movement in one-half to three hours.

== Use and dosage ==
The maximum upper tolerance limit (UTL) for magnesium in supplement form for adults is 350 mg of elemental magnesium per day, according to the National Institutes of Health (NIH) In addition, according to the NIH, total dietary requirements for magnesium from all sources (in other words, food and supplements) is 320–420 mg of elemental magnesium per day, though there is no UTL for dietary magnesium.

=== Laxative ===
Magnesium citrate is used as a laxative agent.

=== Magnesium deficiency treatment ===
Although less common, as a magnesium supplement the citrate form is sometimes used because it is believed to be more bioavailable than other common pill forms, such as magnesium oxide. But, according to one study, magnesium gluconate was found to be marginally more bioavailable than even magnesium citrate.

Potassium-magnesium citrate, as a supplement in pill form, is useful for the prevention of kidney stones.

== Side effects ==
Magnesium citrate is generally not a harmful substance, but care should be taken by consulting a healthcare professional if any adverse health problems are suspected or experienced. Extreme magnesium overdose can result in serious complications such as slow heartbeat, low blood pressure, nausea, drowsiness, etc. If severe enough, an overdose can even result in coma or death. However, a moderate overdose will be excreted through the kidneys, unless one has serious kidney problems. Rectal bleeding or failure to have a bowel movement after use could be signs of a serious condition.

== See also ==
- ATC code A12
- Magnesium aspartate
