= TikTok food trends =

Food-related content on the short video platform

TikTok food trends are popular recipes and food-related fads originating on the social media platform TikTok. Food trends were popular in 2020 during the COVID-19 pandemic, as many people spent more time cooking at home while engaging with social media for entertainment.

Food-related content on TikTok is often categorized under the hashtags #TikTokFood and #FoodTok, which each have millions of posts. Some TikTok users share personal recipes and dietary habits, while others use step-by-step cooking videos to grow their online presence.

The popularity of these trends has had an influence on interest in cooking among younger generations, discussions about body image, the marketing of food products on social media, and temporary food shortages.

Several TikTok content creators, such as Eitan Bernath, Poppy O'Toole and Emily Mariko have gained recognition through their recipes and content. Some of the most notable TikTok food trends include the leftover salmon bowl, baked feta cheese pasta, and pesto eggs.

== Impact ==
=== Body image ===
TikTok food trends are sometimes seen or used as templates for a healthier, nutritional lifestyle for viewers to follow. However, many of these posts are created by users who lack professional qualifications to evaluate these ideas. Quite often, these food trends are associated with lifestyle tips, therefore influencing their diet, daily tasks, and personal routine. TikTok food trends can encourage and stimulate body positivity and allow people to promote the importance of self-satisfaction relating to body image. These food trends can be an opportunity to express themselves and their personal diet choices, while also not conforming to the ideas created by novice users.

'What I eat in a day' videos have been criticized for causing more harm than good. These videos are meant to give an inside look into influencers eating habits; however, Cara Harbstreet says that the cost, time, and energy it takes to produce this day's worth of food, is often left off-camera. Harbstreet, MS, RD, LD, of Street Smart Nutrition, states that the main issue is that influencers are saying, "If you eat like me, you can look like me." This contributes to an unhealthy obsession with healthy eating and disordered eating behaviors.

=== Food shortages ===
TikTok food trends have also caused food shortages of ingredients highlighted in viral videos, For example, the baked feta cheese pasta trend resulted in feta shortages, with a cheese seller based in Rhode Island, one that would usually sell about two-thousand pounds of cheese per week to their regular customers in the city, being out of stock of feta at the height of the trend.

=== Dangerous trends ===
According to food safety experts, there are some viral TikTok trends that should be avoided. According to Janilyn Hutchings, instructions given on TikTok for making grilled cheese sandwiches in a toaster risked causing kitchen fires, because toasters are not designed like panini presses.

=== Increased interest in cooking ===
The easy-to-follow nature of TikTok food trends, recipes, and tutorial videos has led to an increase in youth interaction with the platform. TikTok has proved itself to be an accessible platform for teaching youth groups about basic cooking skills and nutrition. The short duration of TikTok videos requires more compressed and clear recipes, taking away from the complexity usually associated with cooking. With 92% of U.S. adolescents having access to the Internet on a daily basis, TikTok has become an extremely accessible source of information for them to gain practical information, including cooking skills.

A popular trend for college students was folding a tortilla wrap into four triangular pieces and filling it with at-home ingredients such as vegetables and cold meats. Jeremy Scheck, an undergraduate at Cornell University, began to create TikTok content about his passion for food and his recipes when the COVID-19 pandemic began in early 2020. When school transitioned online, Scheck shared trending recipes such as crispy potatoes and fried rice that sparked interest for college students like himself.

Popularity of TikTok recipes among college students may stem from their interest in staying away from fast food. These trends also help college students feel more comfortable in the kitchen.

=== Marketing ===
TikTok has turned into a marketing platform for many brands as cooking-related products gained popularity in the past year. Surveys have proven that using TikTok as a marketing tool has been a successful investment for restaurants or individual food items. The instant feedback allows each company to discover what factors affect the popularity of their products through both reactions to and numbers of views of posts. For instance, Nutter Butter's TikTok has repeatedly dueted TikTok stars including Bella Poarch to reach a larger audience. Another example is when Dunkin' Donuts launched a collaboration with TikTok star Charli D'Amelio to promote a new beverage and the corporation as a whole. From this, Dunkin' cold brew sales rose 20% and 45% respectively in the first two days after the launch. On top of that, the first collaboration video concluded with a 57% increase in the Dunkin' mobile app downloads (corresponding to downloads within 90 days preceding).

It also benefits corporations by providing recommendations to improve their marketing strategy, food items, décor, or any other factor illustrated in the ad. Some input that drives future marketing decisions on platforms like TikTok would include the attractiveness of the items advertised, innovation regarding new and interesting products, and the level of ease for the consumer to purchase the product after seeing the post. Drivers such as these can eliminate possible negative connotations surrounding a product and influence positive reinforcement, feedback, and action for and by the consumer. An example of a company that implements these strategies is Chipotle Mexican Grill. One of their social campaigns is creating TikTok challenges like #GuacDance and #Boorito, in which they create interactive content that follows current social media trends to stimulate an increase in revenue. In particular, #GuacDance became the largest "branded" challenge in the United States with hundreds of thousands of user responses within the week-long event. This campaign resulted in the more than 800,000 sides of guacamole given out on July 31, 2019.

== List of TikTok food trends ==
=== 2020 ===
==== Cloud bread ====
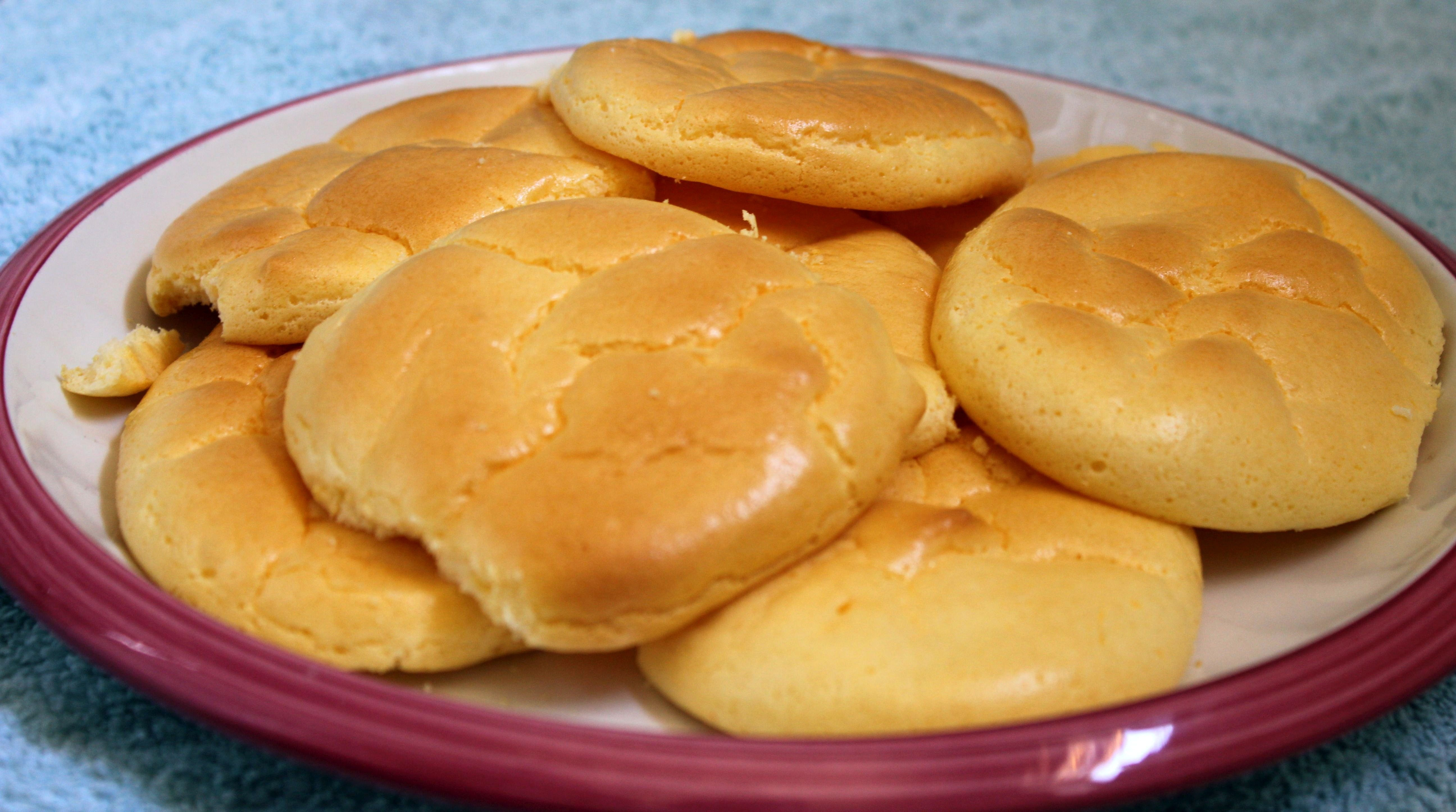
Cloud bread

Cloud bread is a light, fluffy low-carb bread substitute made from egg whites, corn starch, and sugar. Cloud bread gained popularity on TikTok in July 2020, and user @linqanaaa is credited for bringing it to the platform.

==== Dalgona coffee ====
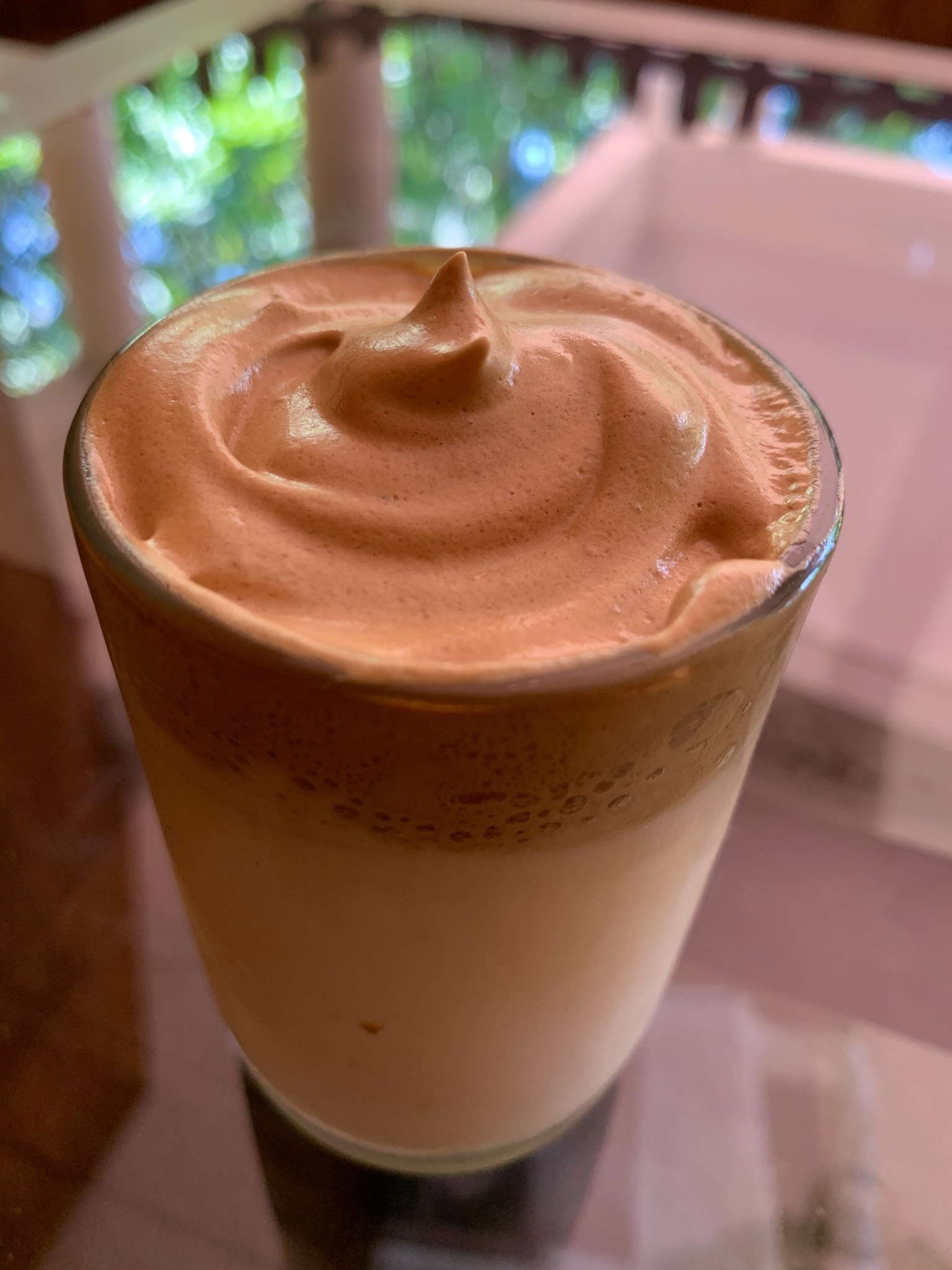
Dalgona coffee

Dalgona coffee is a whipped coffee drink made by combining equal parts of instant coffee, sugar, hot water, and then whisking the mixture until it forms a frothy texture. Although dalgona coffee originates from Macau, it gained popularity in South Korea where it was named after dalgona, a type of Korean candy. The trend emerged on TikTok in March 2020 during the COVID-19 quarantine in the United States.

==== Decorative focaccia bread ====
The decorative focaccia bread trend, under the hashtag #focacciaart, emerged on TikTok in the spring of 2020. Users began decorating their homemade focaccia loaves with designs made from vegetables, herbs, and other edible ingredients.

==== Hot chocolate bombs ====
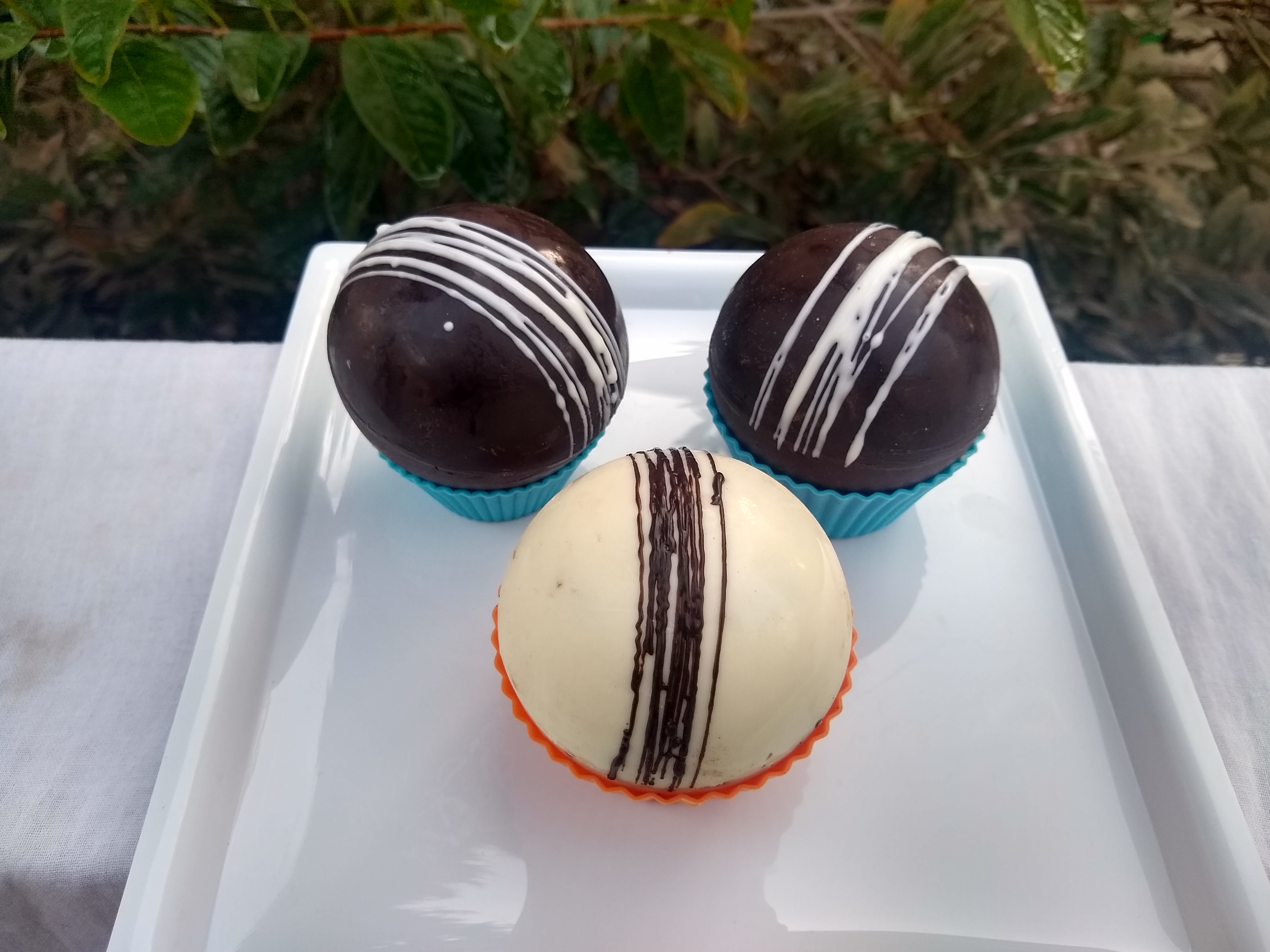
Hot chocolate bombs

Hot chocolate bombs (also known as cocoa bombs) are chocolate spheres filled with hot chocolate mix and confections, such as marshmallows. When placed in hot milk, the chocolate shell melts and releases its contents.

Eric Torres-Garcia (@erictorresg on TikTok) is credited with popularizing cocoa bombs on the platform in December 2020. The trend surged around the 2020 Christmas season, prompting some bakers and store owners to add these confections to their menus. Torres-Garcia claims he posted the first cocoa bombs video on TikTok and has since trademarked the name. Since then, many creators have attempted their own variations of the confection.

==== Mini pancake cereal ====
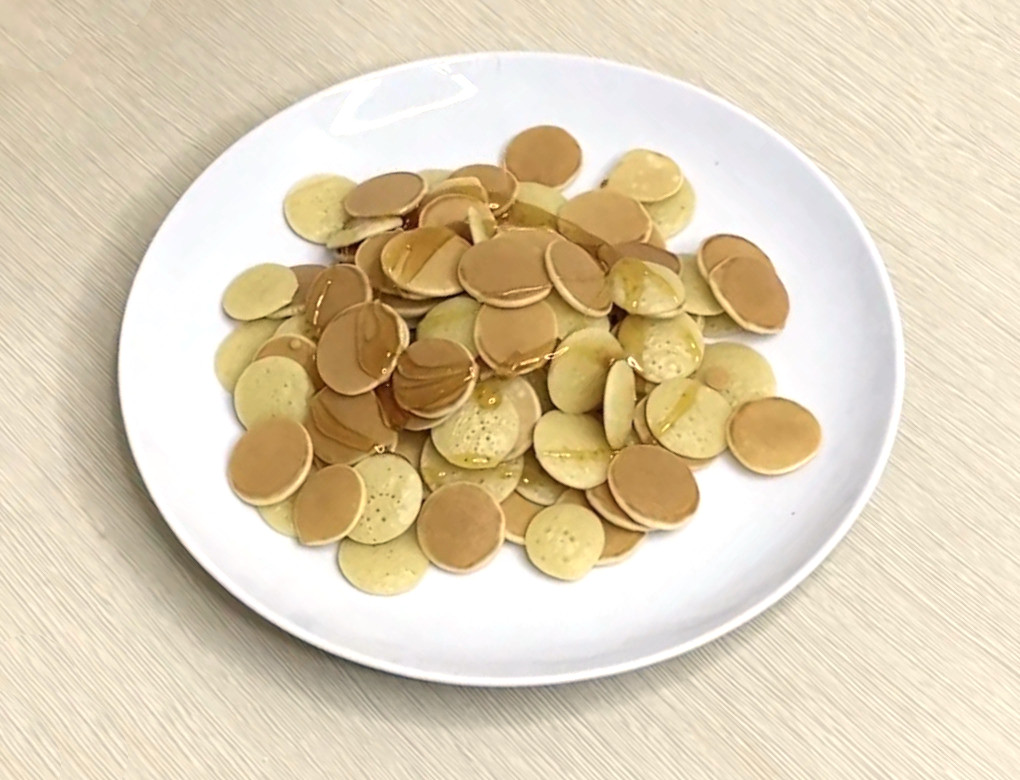
Mini pancake cereal, topped with honey

Mini pancake cereal consists of miniature pancakes served in a bowl, often drizzled with maple syrup and butter, to resemble traditional breakfast cereal. The trend was first introduced in April 2020 by Sydney Melhoff (@sydneymelhoff on TikTok). Following its popularity, users developed variations of the dish using different foods, including cookies, donuts, and croissants.

=== 2021 ===
==== Baked feta cheese pasta ====
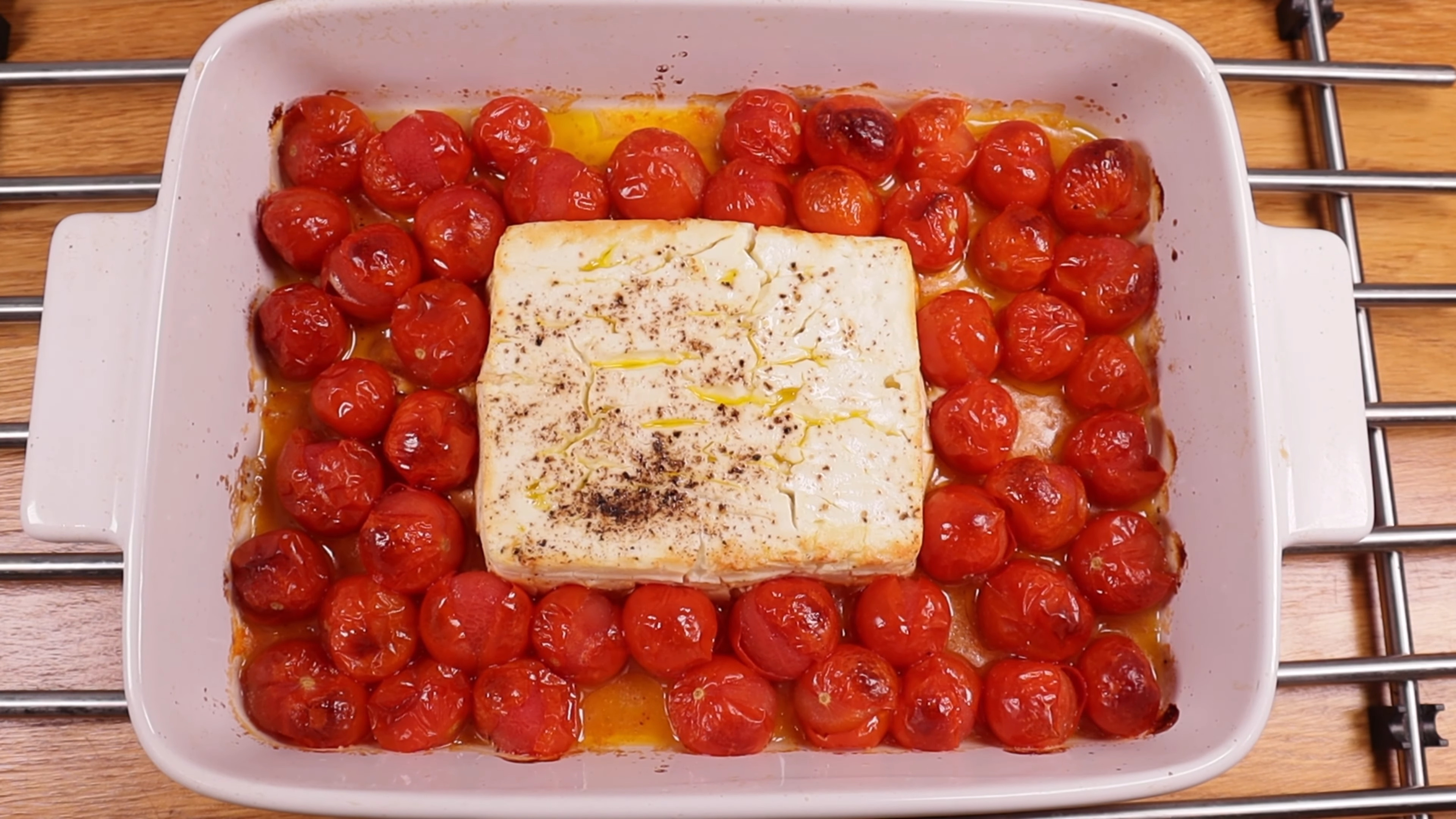
Baked feta and cherry tomatoes

Baked feta cheese pasta is made with a few simple ingredients: cherry tomatoes, a block of feta cheese, olive oil, pasta, basil, and garlic. The tomatoes and feta are baked together in the oven until softened, then mashed into a sauce and mixed with cooked pasta.

The dish gained popularity due to its simplicity and ease of preparation. A Finnish food blogger named Jenni Häyrinen (@liemessa on TikTok) first introduced the recipe in 2019, but it gained popularity on TikTok in February 2021. The trend became so widespread that it led to a temporary shortage of feta cheese in Finnish grocery stores.

==== Baked oats ====
First popular in the spring of 2021, baked oats is a breakfast dish similar to traditional oatmeal, but it is baked instead of cooked on a stovetop. The recipe typically uses oat flour and can be customized with a variety of different flavors.

==== Chili oil eggs ====
TikTok user Jen Curley (@snackqueen on TikTok) popularized a different, spicier approach to the TikTok viral "pesto egg" recipe. As opposed to using pesto, Curley uses chili oil, giving the eggs a complex umami flavor.

==== Flamin' Hot Cheetos salad ====
TikTok user @rxthism created a viral recipe by adding Flamin' Hot Cheetos to a salad mix. The dish, which has garnered over 4.5 million views, consists of Flamin' Hot Cheetos, hot sauce, cilantro, cucumbers, and lemon juice. The dish reflects a broader food fad in September 2021 on TikTok where users incorporate junk food into dishes.

==== Frozen honey ====
The frozen honey trend gained popularity on TikTok in the summer of 2021, with users consuming partially frozen honey directly from plastic bottles. By August 2021, the hashtag #FrozenHoney amassed nearly 600 million views on the app.

The origin of the trend is unclear, though NBC News noted that ASMR creators had previously consumed frozen honey in their YouTube videos due to the satisfying sound it produces. However, reports emerged of some users on the app had experienced digestive issues, such as diarrhea, after consuming large amounts of honey.

==== Leftover salmon bowl ====
The salmon rice bowl trend was originally developed by TikTok lifestyle influencer Emily Mariko. The recipe was first introduced on August 25, 2021, but was revised multiple times with the final variation uploaded on 21 September 2021. The video received 40 million views and inspired 155 related videos.

The dish consists of mashed salmon and rice, heated in a microwave with an ice cube on top to create steam. It is then topped with mayonnaise, soy sauce, and sriracha and eaten with kimchi and dried nori seaweed squares. The dish gained popularity due to its simplicity, use of leftover food, and short preparation time of under 5 minutes.

==== Nature's cereal ====
Nature's cereal is a trend on TikTok developed by user @natures_food in March 2021, where traditional cereal is replaced with fruit; and the milk is replaced with coconut water. Some users claim this cereal relieves constipation and boosts energy. The trend gained additional attention when singer Lizzo posted several videos of herself enjoying the dish.

==== Pesto eggs ====
Pesto eggs is a TikTok food trend involving the substitution of pesto sauce for oil when cooking eggs on a stovetop. The technique is successful since pesto sauce already contains olive oil as a primary ingredient. Amy Wilichowsky (@amywilichowski on TikTok), a dietitian and TikToker, shared a video of her cooking eggs using the technique on the social media platform on April 24, 2021, and is credited as the creator of the trend. The original recipe included bread topped with avocado, ricotta cheese, honey, salt, pepper, and red pepper flakes but multiple variations have arisen since then.

==== Pasta chips ====
Pasta chips were created in June 2021 and are mostly eaten as a snack or appetizer. After cooking pasta in boiling water, the pasta is then added to an air fryer in order to produce a crispy texture. Pasta chips can be seasoned in a variety of different flavors.

=== 2022 ===
==== Cowboy caviar ====
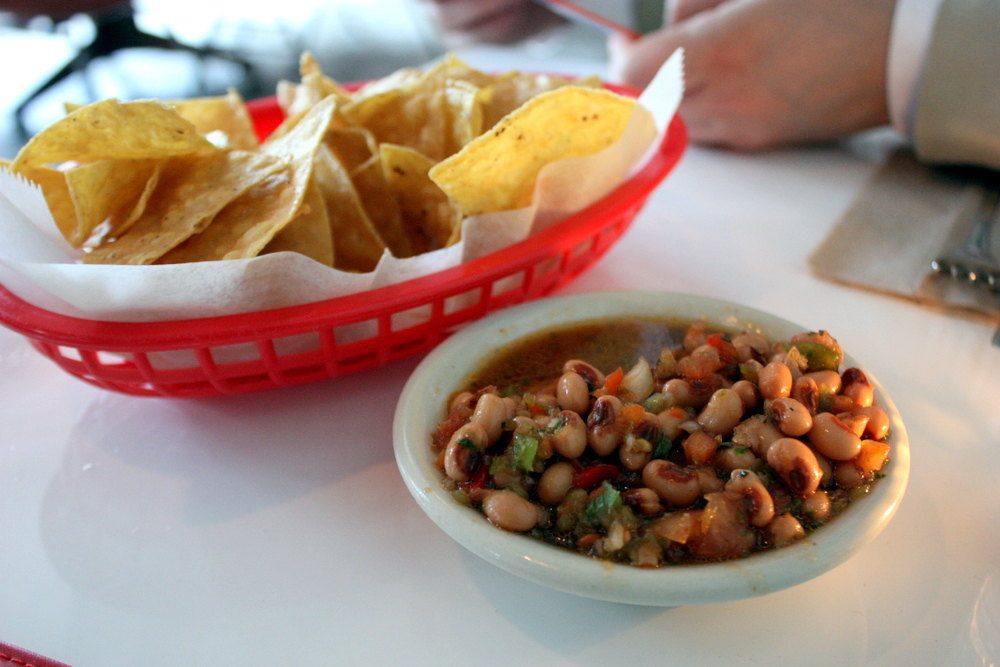
Texas caviar, served with basket of tortilla chips

Cowboy caviar is a modern revival of Texas caviar, a Southern U.S. dish traditionally made with beans, corn, avocado, tomatoes, peppers, onions, and a dressing. The dish gained renewed popularity when user Bria Lemirande (@brialem on TikTok) posted a video of the recipe, receiving over 17 million views and 2.7 million likes. Variations of the dish have since emerged, incorporating ingredients like mangoes, peaches, and pomegranate seeds.

==== Green goddess cabbage salad ====
Created by Baked by Melissa (@bakedbymelissa on TikTok) in January 2022, green goddess cabbage salad is a variation of the traditional green goddess dressing. This vegan, pesto-like dressing is accompanied with shredded, cabbage, chives, scallions, and nuts, with additional vegetables often added based on personal preference.

==== Snow cream ====
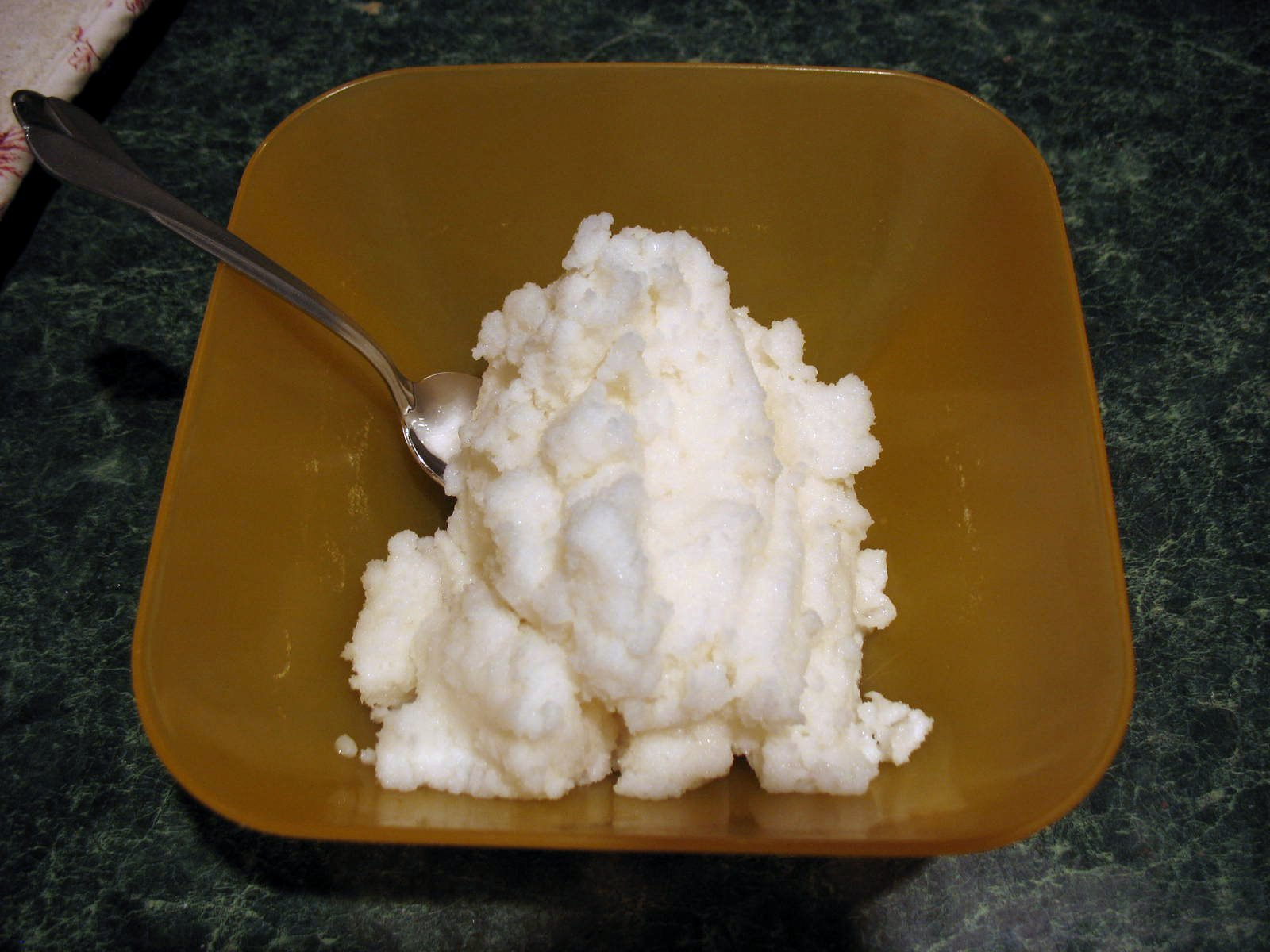
A bowl of snow cream

@sugar_boogerz filmed themselves mixing snow with condensed milk to make snow cream, in December 2022. Other users shared recipes that mixed snow with milk, vanilla, and sugar, and in 2024 Reese Witherspoon made a "snow salt Chococinno" by pouring a salted caramel and chocolate sauce over freshly gathered snow.

==== Spicy pickled garlic ====
TikTok user @lalaleluu introduced spicy pickled garlic as a trend in March 2022. This recipe consists of pickled garlic in a jar, sriracha, chili flakes, and thyme.

==== Water pie ====
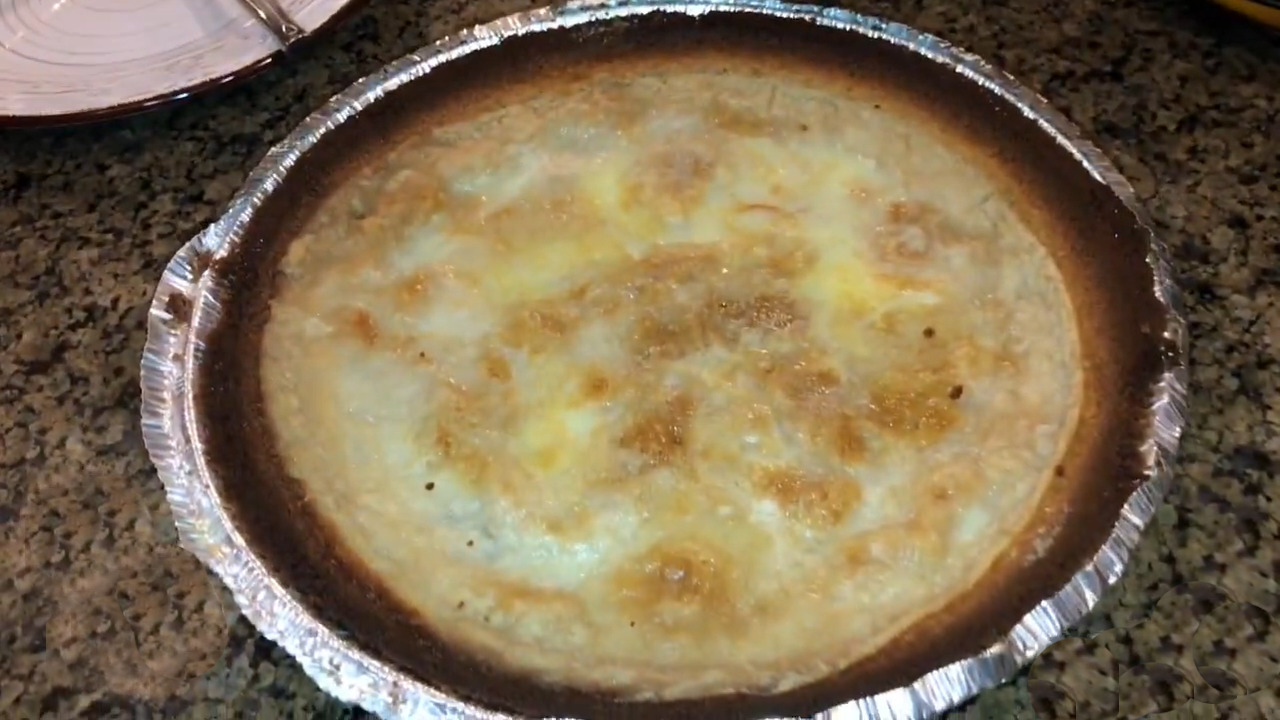
A homemade water pie

Water pie is a Great Depression-era recipe for a pie with a filling made primarily from water, along with pantry staples like flour, sugar, and butter. The recipe went viral on TikTok in 2022, with some users experimenting with variations, including a version made with Sprite.

=== 2023 ===
==== Cottage cheese ====
In 2023, TikTok users popularized cottage cheese as a key ingredient in making ice creams, cookie dough and other foods. This trend contributed to a 15.9% increase in cottage cheese sales in the United States. By May 2024, stores in the United Kingdom reported a 22-30% increase in sales, compared to the previous year.

==== Chopped Italian sandwich ====
The chopped Italian sandwich, characterized by a mixture of chopped Italian cold cuts, cheeses, vegetables, and seasonings, served on a sub roll, gained popularity in March 2023.

==== Cortisol cocktail ====
A drink promoted for stress relief and to combat "adrenal fatigue" made from fruit juice, coconut water, and electrolytes.

==== Girl dinner ====
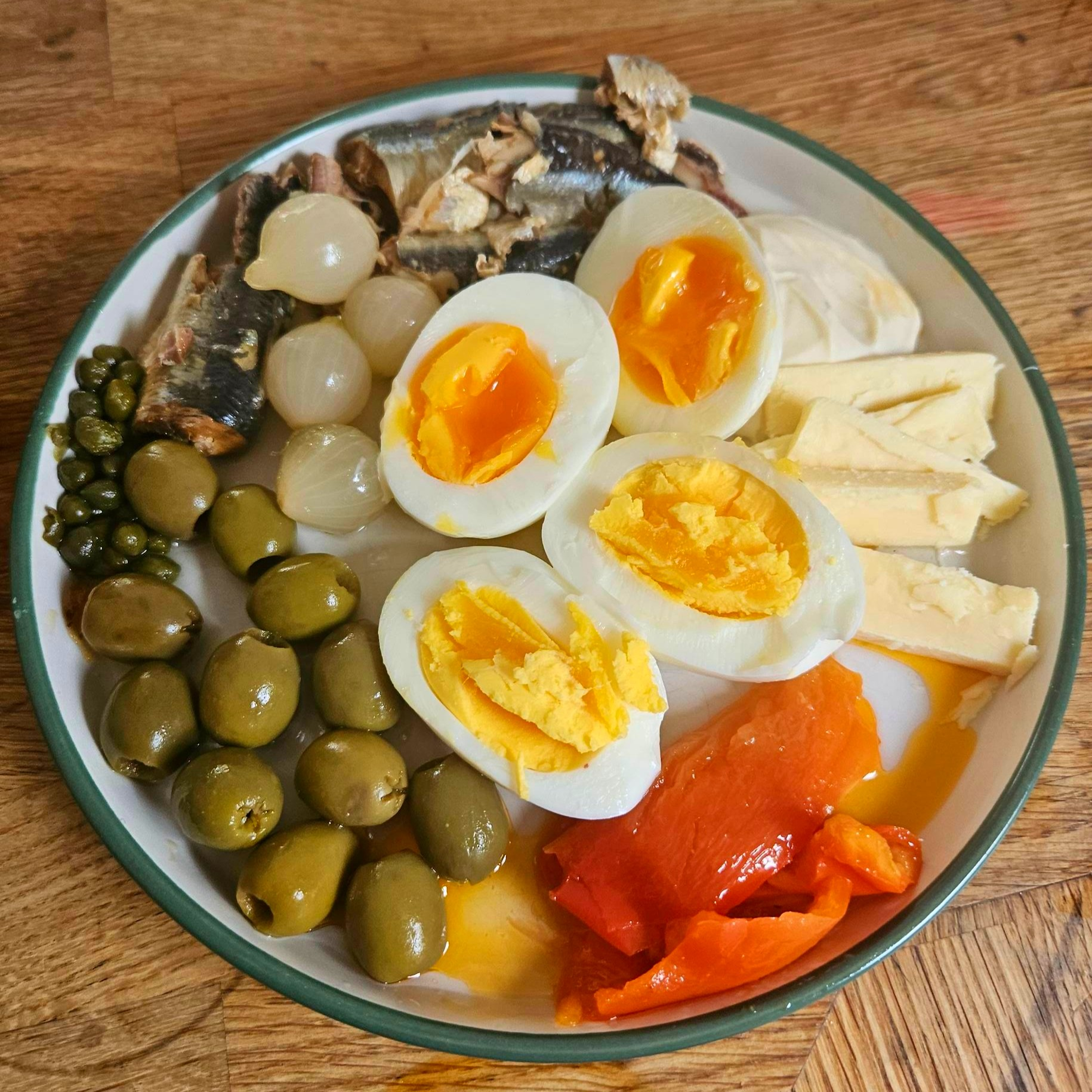
Girl dinner with eggs, fish, cheese, capers, olives, pickled onions, and peppers

Girl dinner is a TikTok trend that emerged in May 2023, originally popularized by Olivia Maher (@liviemaher on TikTok) after she prepared a meal of incongruent foods on a single plate. Cosmopolitan magazine called it the "epitome of antipasti". Bon Appétit instead states it as a rebrand of existing meals such as tapas or the ploughman's lunch.

The trend has been described as a simple, minimalist meal that may not meet nutritional requirements, and usually consists of assorted dips, cheeses, meats, fruits, and vegetables that may not typically pair well together. Girl dinner has been likened to a personal charcuterie board or an adult Lunchable that replaces a traditional cooked dinner. The Cleveland Clinic has noted that girl dinner may be low on required vitamins, minerals and fiber, and high in sodium and trans fats. Beatrix Restaurants in Chicago offered a Girl Dinner set menu of Welcome Drink (Espresso Martini, Pineapple Habanero Margarita, or Prosecco), Kennebec Fries, Caesar Salad, and Rigatoni Alla Vodka. LIA Tavern in Chicago offered a Girl Dinner of martini, Caesar Salad, truffle fries, and choice of vodka rigatoni, goat cheese pizza, or butternut squash pasta.

==== Lasagna soup ====
Popularized by Danny Freeman (@dannylovespasta on TikTok), lasagna soup is essentially a deconstructed version of the classic lasagna. The recipe consists of the typical ingredients one would find in a lasagna, such as ground beef, onions and tomatoes. However, this recipe differentiates itself from a classic lasagna by refraining from layering and including chicken broth. The dish gained more popularity when Grammy Award-winning singer SZA commented on Freeman's video by asking for the recipe.

==== Sleepy girl mocktail ====
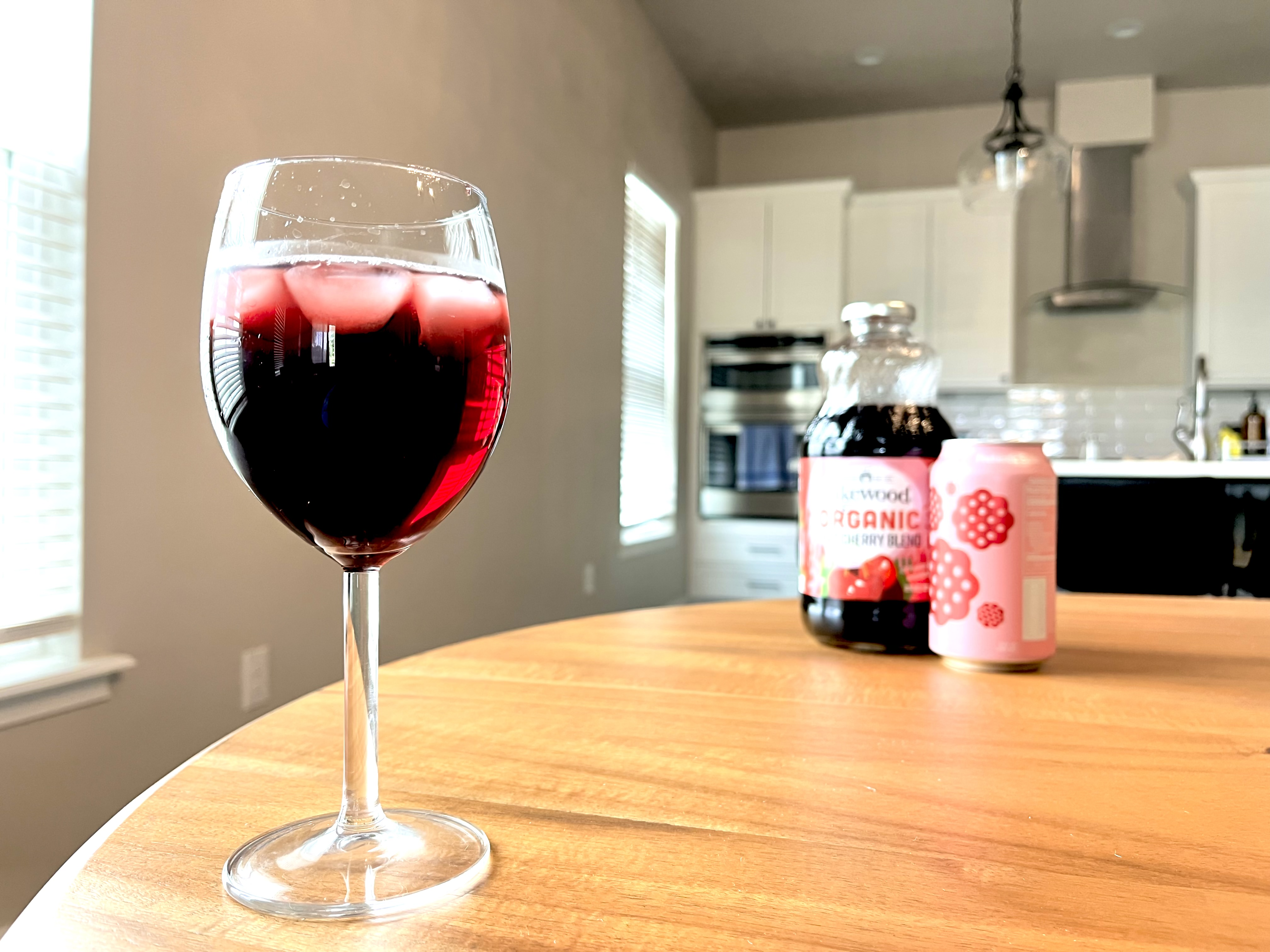
A sleepy girl mocktail

The sleepy girl mocktail trend emerged in 2023, and purports using a cocktail of tart cherry juice, magnesium powder, and seltzer (or soda) as sleep aid.

==== Tini's mac and cheese recipe ====
Tineke Younger's (@tinekeyounger on TikTok) mac and cheese went viral, garnering over 60 million views. The recipe includes traditional ingredients, such as a variety of cheeses, flour, milk, and cream, however Younger's recipe calls for a "surprise ingredient" of Carnation evaporated milk. TikTok comments called it "immaculate" and "the best mac and cheese".

==== WaterTok ====
WaterTok is a TikTok trend which started in April 2023 that involves making and sharing combinations of calorie-free drink mixes to add to water to make drinks. Many WaterTok drinks on the platform are promoted by their creators as a method to lose weight. The trend has been criticised for promoting behavior that is often associated with eating disorders such as extreme calorie restriction and drinking large quantities of water to reduce the feeling of hunger.

=== 2024 ===
==== Cucumber salad ====
Popularized by Logan Moffitt (user @logagm on TikTok), cucumber salad is an Asian-inspired dish in which a cut-up cucumber can be seasoned in a multitude of different ways. The original and most popular method is a copycat recipe of a popular appetizer from Din Tai Fung, a restaurant that specializes in Chinese cuisine. This specific method consists of cucumber slices, fish sauce, MSG, scallions, soy sauce, sesame oil, sesame seeds, and sugar. Another recipe for cucumber salad is designed to replicate a "classic lox bagel" by including ingredients such as dill, cream cheese, and salmon. The recipe was linked to a doubling of cucumber sales in areas of Iceland, leading some to speculate it had caused a shortage in the country. However suppliers were skeptical, explaining that Iceland often experienced cucumber shortages in August.

==== Dubai chocolate ====
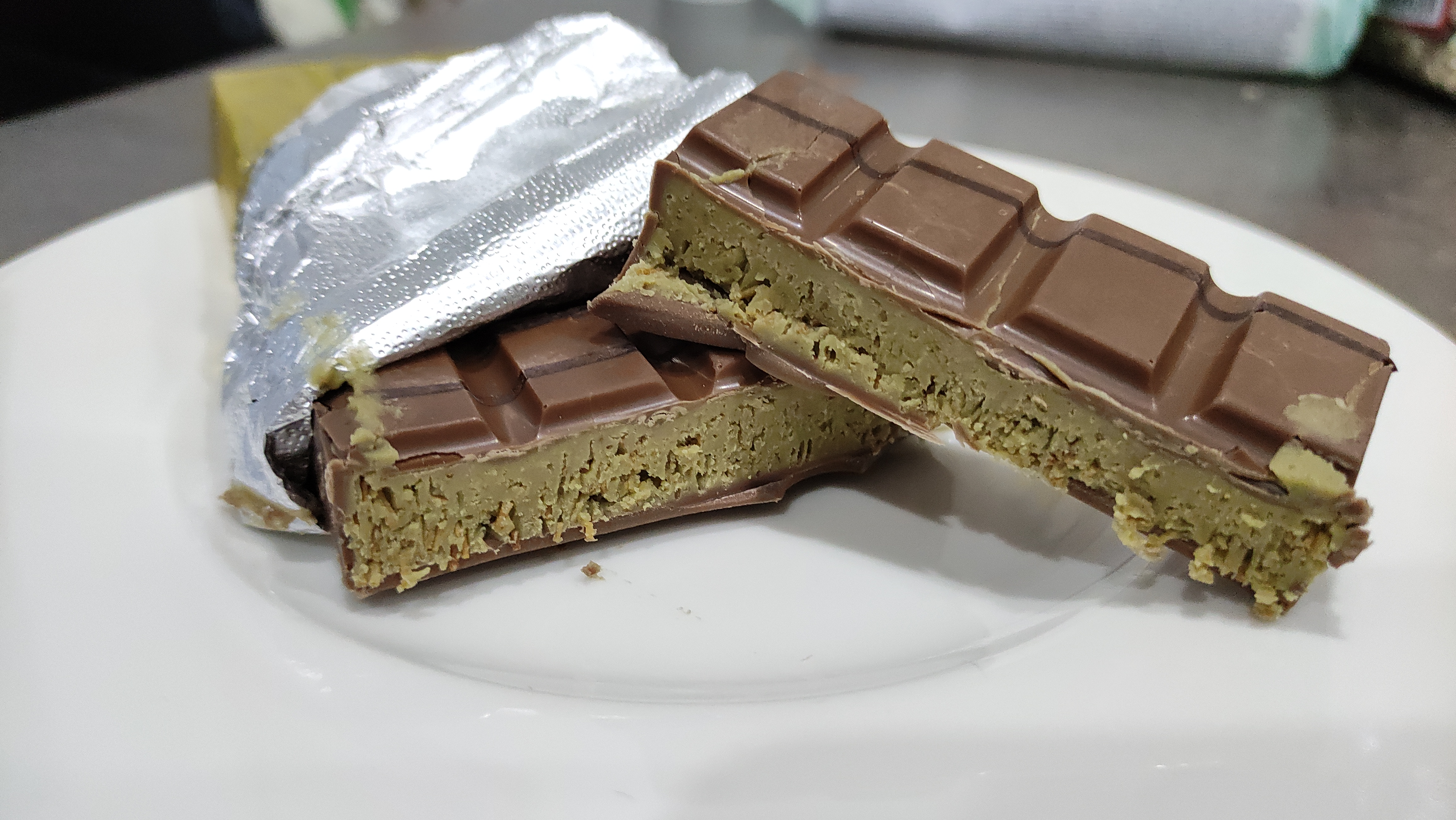
A Dubai-style chocolate bar

A style of chocolate bar filled with kadayif (chopped filo pastry) and a pistachio-tahini cream, invented by a Dubai engineer in 2021, was launched as a product in 2022 and went viral on TikTok in 2024, going on to be imitated by vendors worldwide.

==== Chinese ice cream ====
Propitious Mango ice cream, as well as peach and lemon flavor variations, became viral on TikTok and led to a consumer demand that supermarkets struggled to meet.

==== Chamoy pickle ====
This dish is a whole dill pickle drizzled with the Mexican spiced chamoy sauce, then sprinkled with sweet and sour candy powders and tajín spice mix. The pickle is then wrapped in a fruit roll up and stuffed with Takis-brand tortilla chips.

==== Honey packet ====
In late 2024, a TikTok trend popularized showcased college students consuming honey packets before engaging in sexual activity. In spite of the FDA advisory against consuming the honey packets, the trend continued to grow among students due to the influence of social media and its ease of availability.

==== Tanghulu ====
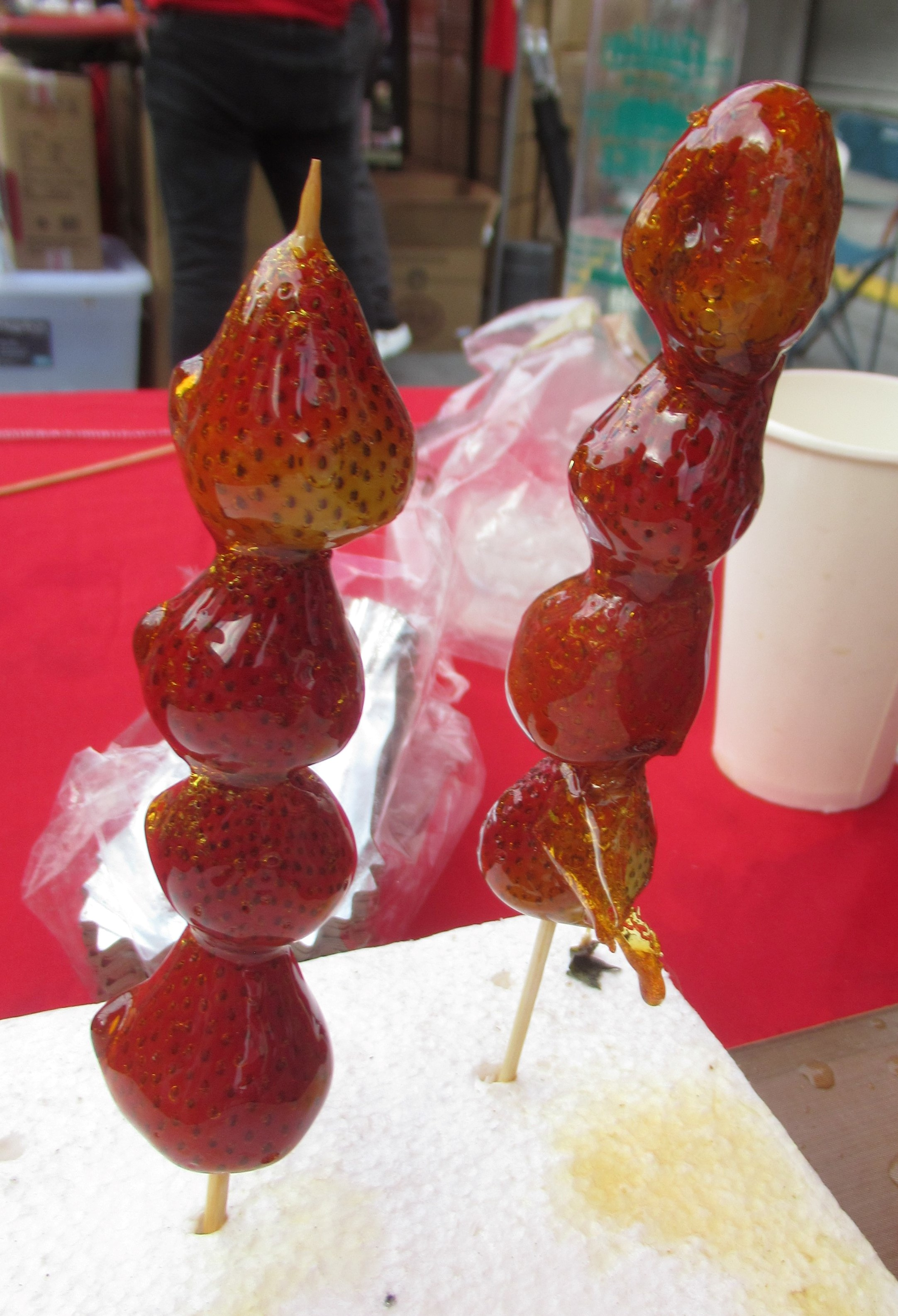
Tanghulu

Tanghulu is both an ASMR and food trend. This dessert is a traditional Chinese street food that has gone viral and captured the attention of social media users. Any kind of fruit can be used, including pineapple, grapes, strawberries, and kiwi. It is described as having a sweet, juicy, fruity interior inside of a candied shell. It can be made by boiling water and sugar on the stove which makes the outside harden around the fruit when it cools.

ASMR stands for Autonomous Sensory Meridian Response, which is a sensory phenomenon where individuals can experience a tingling, static-like sensation, often accompanied by feelings of relaxation and well-being, triggered by specific auditory or visual stimuli.

==== A whole onion ====
This trend features a whole onion that must be slightly hollowed out so that it can be stuffed with butter and spices. It is then slow roasted, which brings out the natural sweet and tenderness of the onion. It can be paired with grilled meats or other roasted vegetable.

==== Food flights ====
Food flights became a very popular trend in 2024. They began with baked potatoes and later moved onto eggs, mac & cheese, fries, and even steak. All of these foods get different toppings that serve as their own mini entrees. The toppings can include a variety of different sauces, cheeses vegetables, and seasonings.

=== 2025 ===
==== Matcha ====
Matcha lattes became popular on TikTok in 2025, as part of a wider trend of western popularity of Japanese foods. The trend started from videos videos of homemade matcha lattes and led to "unprecedented hype" amongst matcha suppliers, and led to a shortage. Interest in matcha was attributed to its eye-catching colour, health benefits, and increased tourism in Japan.

The popularity of matcha lattes inspired a wider food trend of matcha flavoured food.

Matcha lattes are associated with the performative male archetype, the term for which was popularised on TikTok.

==== Seafood boil ====
A seafood boil usually refers to an outdoor food gathering were seafood is served. However, as commonly used on Tiktok, seafood boil refers to a mix of seafood and other ingredients, cooked together in a cajun style.

The #seafoodboil hashtag received over 250,000 videos.

== Notable figures ==
=== Eitan Bernanth ===
Eitan Bernath is a TikTok star with over 1.6 million followers on the platform as of May 2021. After teaching himself to cook by watching YouTube and the Food Network, he posted his first TikTok in 2019: within 24 hours of posting his first video on an easy-to-make recipe, he gained tens of thousands of followers. His trademark upbeat and energetic behavior in combination with his focus on easy recipes differentiates him from traditional culinary experts.

=== Jeron Combs ===
Jeron Combs posted his first TikTok video in May 2020 from a prison cell, and since then has attracted millions of viewers. Combs converted his metal bed frame into a cooking surface and documented his meal preparation process.

=== Emily Mariko ===
Emily Mariko attained TikTok fame after posting a recipe video about leftover salmon bowls on August 25, 2021. Her signature salmon dish, along with the lack of music and filler audio in contrast to most TikTok culinary videos, has created a following of over 12 million people.

=== Logan Moffitt ===
Notable for his interest in South-Korean cuisine, Logan Moffitt (or @logagm on TikTok) is known for popularizing multiple different versions of a cucumber salad recipe across the internet. Moffitt, who is from Ottawa, was drawn to the kitchen as a result of his youth, in which he "grew up watching a lot of different cooking shows on TV." On TikTok, he's commonly referred to as the "cucumber guy". Those who recreate his recipes online often honor and refer to him by starting their videos with his iconic opener, "sometimes you need to eat an entire cucumber."

=== Jeremy Scheck ===
With over 2 million followers on TikTok, Jeremy Scheck is a college student who creates culinary content that focuses on culture, nutrition, and humor. He quickly found success after taking classes relating to dairy science, nutrition, and horticulture. His nutritional commentary and cultural references stem from his university coursework.

=== Nara Smith ===
Born in South Africa, raised in Germany, and currently residing in the United States, Nara Aziza Smith is most notable on TikTok for her soft-spoken recipes, always entirely made from scratch. Smith's home-made recipes range from things like bread and chicken wings to "moisturizer, Takis, gum, cough drops, Coca-Cola". Alongside being a talented cook, Smith is a mother of three, a wife, and a model. Many of her recipe videos involve her wearing lavish designer clothing. While many people have coined her as a tradwife, Smith dislikes the label, claiming that "sure, she's 'traditional' in the sense that she's making things from scratch, but it's not traditional when you're doing it so glamorously and you're making big money at the same time."

=== Jessica Woo ===
As a mother of three, Jessica Woo documents her process for packing her kids' lunches. Her focus on consistently artful presentations of common foods, such as salami and string cheese, draws an audience of over 5 million viewers as of August 2020. Her handwritten notes and catchphrase, "let's make some lunch for my kids," attract hundreds of thousands of viewers to her videos, and she cites an emphasis on being "like a regular mom" as her key to success.

=== Tineke "Tini" Younger ===
Younger is best known for her viral mac and cheese recipe, which garnered over 60 million views on TikTok. Younger has also appeared on the cooking contest series Next Level Chef alongside chef Gordon Ramsay, where she finished in eighth place. She was part of a brand deal with Carnation, following her usage of the brand's evaporated milk in her viral mac and cheese recipe. Carnation introduced "Kickin' Jalapeño Flavored Evaporated Milk", their first flavored product, as part of the promotion.
