= Snow cream =

Dessert

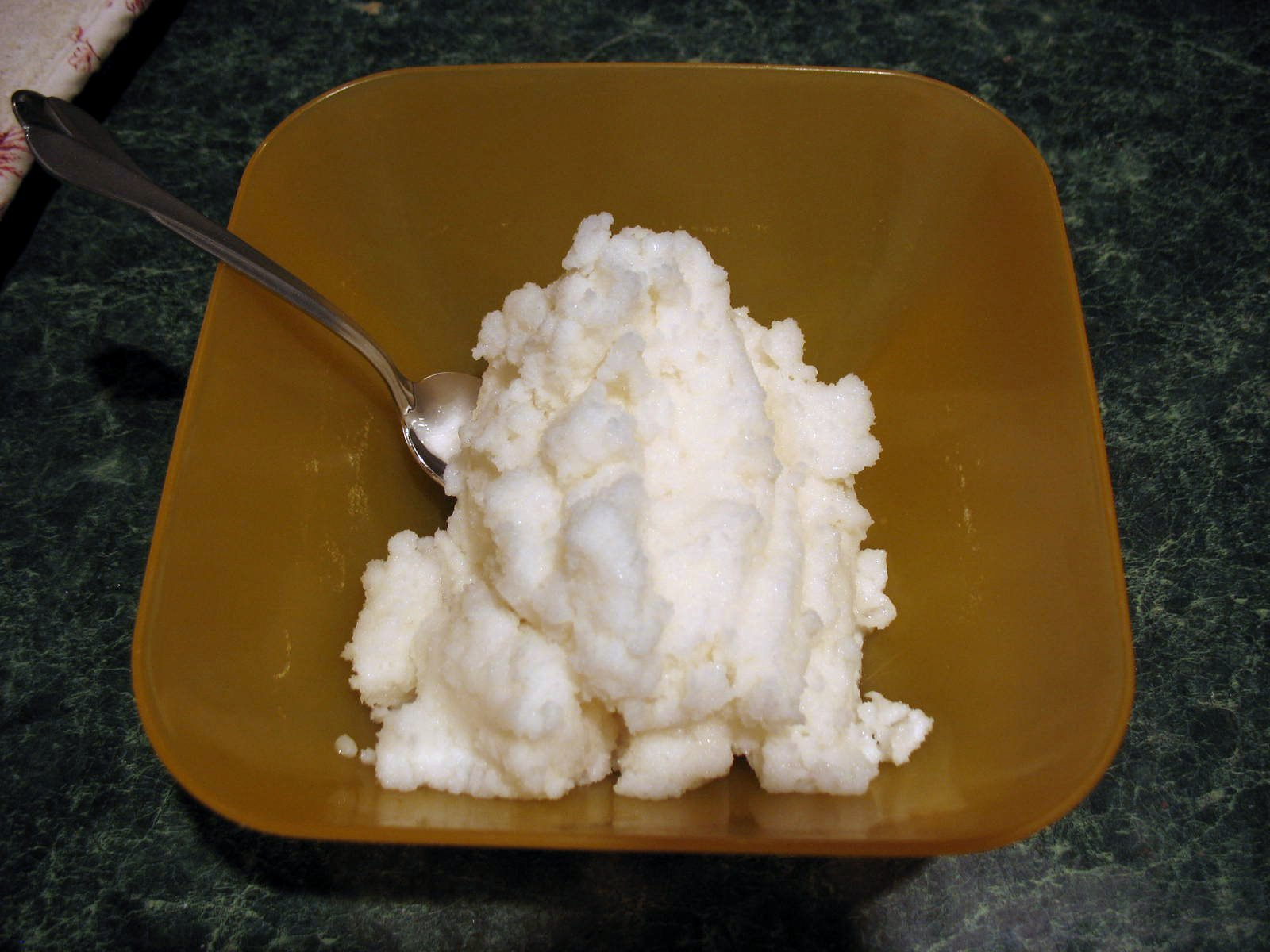
- A bowl of snow cream made from real snow.
- Alternative names: Snow, snowe
- Type: Dessert

Snow cream is a dessert in which snow is mixed with a sweetened dairy-based liquid to make an ice cream substitute. This is also known as snow ice cream.

== Preparation ==
The technique of using snow as a main ingredient in a dessert is very old. Common ingredients for this variety are a dairy based ingredient, sugar and a flavouring agent. In adding a small amount of dairy-based liquid and a flavouring agent (similar to ice cream ingredients) into clean snow, the snow melts and congeals into a simple ice cream substitute.

Discussing a 2024 TikTok food trend for making snow cream, a physician from the Mayo Clinic Health System advised against using snow that had been on the ground for some days, as it may contain dirt, pollution, animal debris or chemicals from snow removal.

== Other "snow" recipes ==
There are a variety of recipes bearing the name of snow but which are custards with various flavorings and toppings rather than participate deserts.

Apple snow, with puréed apple added to the basic recipe, was popular served hot in the 17th century while a more modern version is eaten cold. Fruit juice contents were also used in lemon and orange snow. There is a Russian version that is called air pie, which is egg white, sugar, and fruit pureé, whipped and served hot.

Summer snow is known as a version with fruit content, egg whites and alcohol.

Snowballs can be a variety of desserts. They are usually not related to snow cream desserts. One of these, which is more commonly known as slush, and is based on ice and fruit syrup, can be seen as related to snow cream.

A snow cone or sno cone is a frozen dessert made of crushed or shaved ice, flavored with brightly colored syrup, usually fruit-flavored, served in a paper cone or cup.

Flavored and sweetened whipped cream was historically called "snow cream".

== See also ==
- Frozen yogurt
- Ice cream
- List of desserts
- Shaved ice
