= Diisopropylamine dichloroacetate =

Chemical compound used in human and equine medicine

Names
- IUPAC name 2,2-dichloroacetic acid;N-propan-2-ylpropan-2-amine
- Systematic IUPAC name Diisopropylamine dichloroacetate
- Other names: DADA; DIPA; Liverall; Oxypangam

Identifiers
CAS Number	660-27-5
3D model (JSmol)	Interactive image
ChEBI	CHEBI:31492
ChemSpider	12097
ECHA InfoCard	100.010.491
EC Number	211-538-2
KEGG	D01816
PubChem CID	12617
UNII	BA6QDP0R4E
CompTox Dashboard (EPA)	DTXSID7060962
- InChI: InChI=1S/C6H15N.C2H2Cl2O2/c1-5(2)7-6(3)4;3-1(4)2(5)6/h5-7H,1-4H3;1H,(H,5,6) Key: ILKBHIBYKSHTKQ-UHFFFAOYSA-N
- SMILES: CC(C)NC(C)C.OC(=O)C(Cl)Cl

Properties
Chemical formula	C_{8}H_{17}Cl_{2}NO_{2}
Molar mass	230.13 g/mol
Appearance	White crystalline powder
Solubility in water	Soluble
Solubility	Soluble in ethanol, chloroform Slightly soluble in ether
- Except where otherwise noted, data are given for materials in their standard state (at 25 °C [77 °F], 100 kPa). (what is ?) Infobox references

Diisopropylamine dichloroacetate (commonly abbreviated DADA) is the diisopropylamine salt of dichloroacetic acid. It has been marketed in Japan under the trade name Liverall for the treatment of chronic liver conditions, including fatty liver and hepatitis. In laboratory studies, DADA has demonstrated activity as a pyruvate dehydrogenase kinase 4 (PDK4) inhibitor. In a 2014 animal model of severe influenza, oral administration of DADA restored pyruvate dehydrogenase activity, improved ATP production, and significantly increased survival. The compound has also been cited in equine sports medicine due to its metabolism to diisopropylamine, a known vasodilator prohibited in race horses.

== Chemistry and background ==
DADA is formed by combining diisopropylamine with dichloroacetic acid. It is chemically related to pangamic acid (formerly known as "vitamin B_{15}"), which may convert to DADA and diisopropylamine in the body.

== Pharmacology ==
DADA functions primarily as an inhibitor of pyruvate dehydrogenase kinase 4 (PDK4), which regulates the pyruvate dehydrogenase complex (PDC) that links glycolysis and mitochondrial oxidative phosphorylation. In preclinical mouse models of H1N1 influenza infection, DADA restored down‑regulated pyruvate dehydrogenase activity, increased ATP production in key organs (e.g., liver, lung, muscle), suppressed cytokine storm, and improved survival rates.

In vitro studies on cancer cell lines—including non‑small cell lung carcinoma (A549)—demonstrated that DADA induces apoptosis, reduces lactate production, and alters tumor metabolic profiles, with synergistic effects when used alongside chemotherapy or radiotherapy.

Pharmacokinetic data from equine and human studies indicate that DADA is rapidly absorbed and metabolized to diisopropylamine (DIPA) and dichloroacetate (DCA), with delayed elimination following chronic dosing. It is well-tolerated in both species at therapeutic doses, although detailed human safety profiles remain limited.

== History ==
DADA was first identified in 1951 as a component of pangamic acid isolated from apricot seeds, and became available for clinical investigation in the 1960s for hepatoprotective properties. It was marketed in Japan under brand names such as Liverall [and Oxypangam?] for chronic liver disorders, including fatty liver and hepatitis.

In the 1980s, researchers explored DADA's vasodilatory effects and metabolism to DIPA in equine and human subjects. A study published in 1988 monitored pharmacokinetics and behavioral outcomes in horses and noted agricultural and performance interests.

More recently, the compound has gained scientific interest due to its metabolic regulatory mechanisms. A 2014 PLoS ONE study by Yamane et al. demonstrated its efficacy in treating severe influenza in mice via PDK4 inhibition. Since then, DADA has attracted attention in oncology research for its tumor‑metabolism targeting capabilities and is currently under exploration for its synergistic potential in cancer therapy.

== Medical research and therapeutic use ==
=== Liver disease ===
DADA has been prescribed in Japan for over 50 years for the treatment of chronic liver ailments such as fatty liver and hepatitis.

=== Influenza and metabolic disorders ===
In a 2014 study, DADA showed efficacy in reversing mitochondrial dysfunction in influenza-infected mice by inhibiting PDK4, leading to restored mitochondrial enzyme activity, ATP generation, and improved survival.

=== Cancer research ===
In vitro research indicates that DADA may induce apoptosis in non-small cell lung cancer cells (e.g., A549), though such findings are preliminary and have not been validated in human trials.

== Veterinary and sports context ==
=== Equine usage ===
In the 1980s, DADA and its metabolite diisopropylamine (DIPA) were investigated in racehorses for possible performance-enhancing effects. Although no definitive athletic benefit was proven, the compound raised concerns due to its vasodilatory and oxygen-enhancing potential.

=== Doping and bans ===
Diisopropylamine is listed by the International Federation of Horseracing Authorities as a banned vasodilator. Tribunal documents from the Fédération Equestre Internationale (FEI) have reported its covert use under the label of "vitamin B_{15}" with the intent of enhancing equine performance.

== Performance-enhancing potential ==
Although DADA may metabolize into diisopropylamine, which could theoretically improve oxygen delivery via vasodilation, there is no clinical evidence of performance enhancement in humans. Studies on its parent compound, dichloroacetate (DCA), suggest mild improvements in lactate clearance and oxygen uptake. Trials in the 1980s using pangamic acid in humans and rodents did not show consistent or significant gains in endurance or performance.

== Safety and legal status ==
=== Safety concerns ===
The United States Food and Drug Administration (FDA) considers pangamic acid and its derivatives—including DADA—as unapproved and potentially unsafe dietary components. Several formulations have been banned or removed from the market as adulterants.

=== Regulatory actions ===
Veterinary sporting bodies have issued suspensions and fines for the use of diisopropylamine derivatives. These substances remain listed on international banned-substance registers.
