= Magnesium levulinate =

Chemical compound

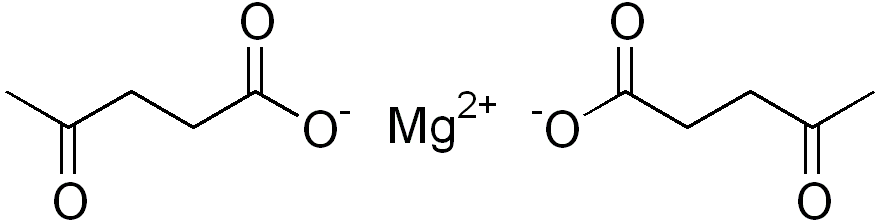

Clinical data
- AHFS/Drugs.com: Consumer Drug Information
- MedlinePlus: a607062
- ATC code: A12CC07 (WHO)

Identifiers
- IUPAC name: Magnesium 4-oxopentanoate
- CAS Number: 58505-81-0
- PubChem CID: 11586912
- DrugBank: DB14514
- ChemSpider: 9761676
- UNII: DU3I0H5Z4H
- ChEMBL: ChEMBL3707302
- CompTox Dashboard (EPA): DTXSID90905131
- ECHA InfoCard: 100.055.708

Chemical and physical data
- Formula: C_{10}H_{14}MgO_{6}
- Molar mass: 254.521 g·mol^{−1}
- 3D model (JSmol): Interactive image
- Solubility in water: 1.22mg/mL
- SMILES: [Mg+2].O=C([O-])CCC(=O)C.[O-]C(=O)CCC(=O)C
- InChI: InChI=1S/2C5H8O3.Mg/c2*1-4(6)2-3-5(7)8;/h2*2-3H2,1H3,(H,7,8);/q;;+2/p-2; Key:RECCGACJWKEPOU-UHFFFAOYSA-L

Magnesium levulinate, the magnesium salt of levulinic acid, is a mineral supplement.
