= Zinc proteinate =

Nutritional animal feed supplement

Clinical data
- Pregnancy category: A
- Routes of administration: Oral
- ATC code: A12CB03 (WHO)

Legal status
- Legal status: In general: Over-the-counter (OTC)

Identifiers
- ChemSpider: none

Zinc proteinate is the final product resulting from the chelation of zinc with amino acids and/or partially hydrolyzed proteins. It is used as a nutritional animal feed supplement formulated to prevent and/or correct zinc deficiency in animals. Zinc proteinate can be used in place of zinc sulfate and zinc methionine.
