= Magnesium citrate (3:2) =

Names
- Preferred IUPAC name Trimagnesium bis(2-hydroxypropane-1,2,3-tricarboxylate)

Identifiers
CAS Number	3344-18-1
3D model (JSmol)	Interactive image
ChEBI	CHEBI:131389
ChemSpider	2925651
ECHA InfoCard	100.020.086
EC Number	222-093-9
KEGG	D03265
PubChem CID	3693607
UNII	RHO26O1T9V
CompTox Dashboard (EPA)	DTXSID601015151
- InChI: InChI=1S/2C6H8O7.3Mg/c2*7-3(8)1-6(13,5(11)12)2-4(9)10;;;/h2*13H,1-2H2,(H,7,8)(H,9,10)(H,11,12);;;/q;;3*+2/p-6 Key: PLSARIKBYIPYPF-UHFFFAOYSA-H; InChI=1/2C6H8O7.3Mg/c2*7-3(8)1-6(13,5(11)12)2-4(9)10;;;/h2*13H,1-2H2,(H,7,8)(H,9,10)(H,11,12);;;/q;;3*+2/p-6 Key: PLSARIKBYIPYPF-CYFPFDDLAW
- SMILES: C(C(=O)[O-])C(CC(=O)[O-])(C(=O)[O-])O.C(C(=O)[O-])C(CC(=O)[O-])(C(=O)[O-])O.[Mg].[Mg].[Mg]

Properties
Chemical formula	C_{12}H_{10}Mg_{3}O_{14}
Molar mass	451.113 g·mol^{−1}
Appearance	White powder
- Except where otherwise noted, data are given for materials in their standard state (at 25 °C [77 °F], 100 kPa). verify (what is ?) Infobox references

Magnesium citrate (3:2) (3 magnesium atoms per 2 citrate molecules), also called trimagnesium dicitrate, trimagnesium citrate, or the ambiguous name magnesium citrate. The substance may come as anhydrous or hydrated salt with varying properties.

The anhydrous salt has good solubility in water (~10% or more at 25 °C) and contains 16.2% elemental magnesium by weight. Its taste is slightly bitter-alkaline.

The hydrated salt may have 3 to 14 molecules of water attached to it and has much lower solubility in water (2% or less at 25 °C). This form doesn't have any noticeable taste.
