= Calcium glubionate =

Chemical compound

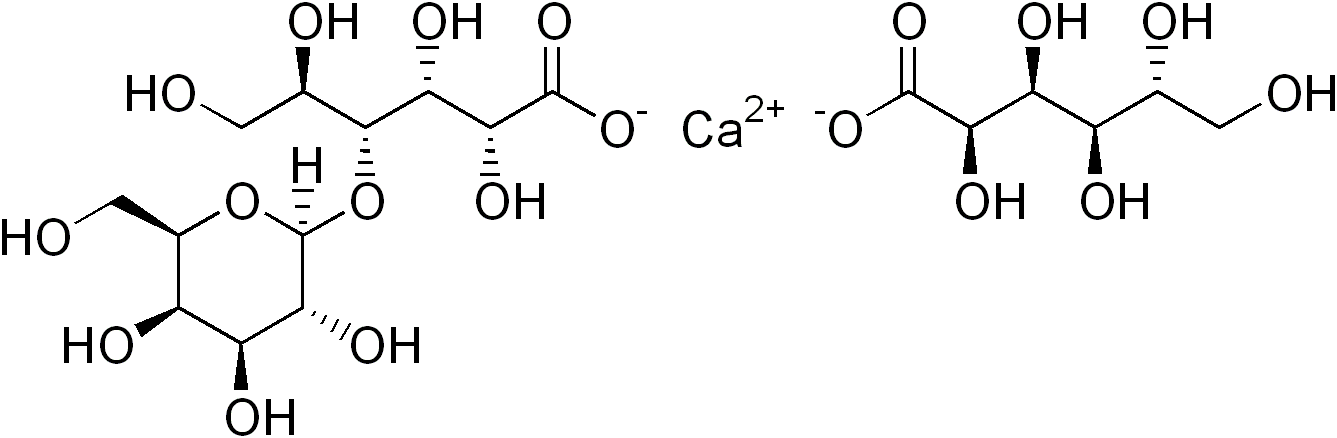

Clinical data
- AHFS/Drugs.com: Micromedex Detailed Consumer Information
- ATC code: A12AA02 (WHO)

Identifiers
- IUPAC name: calcium (2R,3S,4R,5R)-2,3,4,5,6-pentahydroxyhexanoate (2R,3R,4R,5R)-2,3,5,6-tetrahydroxy-4-[(2S,3R,4S,5R,6R)-3,4,5-trihydroxy-6-(hydroxymethyl)oxan-2-yl]oxyhexanoate
- CAS Number: 12569-38-9
- PubChem CID: 64776
- ChemSpider: 58310
- UNII: 3CF7K0SD0Q
- CompTox Dashboard (EPA): DTXSID20953847
- ECHA InfoCard: 100.097.583

Chemical and physical data
- Formula: C_{18}H_{32}CaO_{19}
- Molar mass: 592.513 g·mol^{−1}
- 3D model (JSmol): Interactive image
- SMILES: [Ca+2].[O-]C(=O)[C@H](O)[C@@H](O)[C@H](O)[C@H](O)CO.[O-]C(=O)[C@H](O)[C@@H](O)[C@H](O[C@@H]1O[C@@H]([C@H](O)[C@H](O)[C@H]1O)CO)[C@H](O)CO
- InChI: InChI=1S/C12H22O12.C6H12O7.Ca/c13-1-3(15)10(7(18)8(19)11(21)22)24-12-9(20)6(17)5(16)4(2-14)23-12;7-1-2(8)3(9)4(10)5(11)6(12)13;/h3-10,12-20H,1-2H2,(H,21,22);2-5,7-11H,1H2,(H,12,13);/q;;+2/p-2/t3-,4-,5+,6+,7-,8-,9-,10-,12+;2-,3-,4+,5-;/m11./s1; Key:YPCRNBPOUVJVMU-LCGAVOCYSA-L

Calcium glubionate (or glubionate calcium) is a mineral supplement that is used to treat hypocalcemia.
