= Ernst T. Krebs =

Promoter of the quack cancer treatment laetrile

Ernst T. Krebs Jr.
- Born: May 17, 1911; Carson City, Nevada
- Died: September 8, 1996 (aged 85); San Francisco California
- Occupation: Alternative cancer treatment advocate

Ernst Theodore Krebs Jr. (May 17, 1911 – September 8, 1996) was an American promoter of various substances as alternative cures for cancer, including pangamic acid and amygdalin. He also co-patented the semi-synthetic chemical compound closely related to amygdalin called laetrile, which was also promoted as a cancer preventative and cure. His medical claims about these compounds are not supported by scientific evidence and are widely considered quackery.

== Biography ==
Krebs was born in Carson City, Nevada, on 17 May 1911. His father was Ernst Theodore Krebs Sr. (September 26, 1876–January 25, 1970), a physician who promoted a syrup as treatment for various ailments which was later deemed fraudulent, seized, and destroyed, and later promoted the enzyme chymotrypsin as a cancer remedy. Krebs, Jr. would ultimately work closely with his father in promoting Laetrile and pangamic acid.

Krebs attended Hahnemann Medical College for three years, including one year spent repeating the first year but he was expelled after failing out of his courses. Krebs later attended college in various states including Mississippi, California, and Tennessee. He ultimately received a Bachelor of Arts degree from the University of Illinois after failing science courses at the various colleges. Although he claimed to have a Ph.D. from the University of Illinois, and his supporters often refer to him as "Dr. Krebs," his only doctoral degree was an honorary degree from the now defunct American Christian College in Tulsa, OK, which was a small bible college not accredited to award any advanced degrees. He would later spend two years doing graduate work in anatomy but was dismissed for "his pursuit of what was deemed unorthodox."

He died at his home in San Francisco, California on September 8, 1996. He was not related to Hans Adolf Krebs, the biochemist known for discovering the Krebs cycle.

== Advocacy ==
Krebs was the director of the John Beard Memorial Foundation, where he promoted fraudulent claims about a laetrile cancer remedy. A criminal prosecution was filed against Krebs and the foundation. In March 1962, they were both fined, and Krebs was put on probation for several years with conditions similar to an injunction decree.

=== Cancer theory ===
Krebs advocated the view, first introduced in 1902 by John Beard, revived by Krebs and his father in the 1940s and 1950s, that all forms of cancer arise from undifferentiated cells called trophoblasts. Krebs Sr. revived this theory by the embryologist Beard from Scotland to promote one of his cancer cures, chymotrypsin. Although this theory had been rejected by cancer researchers, Krebs Jr. nevertheless incorporated this theory as one of the explanations for the mechanism of action for Laetrile against cancer cells as well. This mechanism was subsequently abandoned as he later claimed Laetrile was instead a vitamin.

=== Pangamic acid ===
Pangamic acid, also called "pangamate," and "vitamin B_{15}," is the name given to the chemical compound described as d-gluconodimethylamino acetic acid with the empirical formula C_{10}H_{19}O_{8}N and purportedly isolated from apricot seeds. It was initially promoted by Ernst T. Krebs, Sr. and his son Ernst T. Krebs, Jr. as a medicinal compound for use in the treatment of a wide range of diseases. They also termed this chemical "Vitamin B_{15}," though it is not a true vitamin, has no nutritional value, has no known use in the long-term treatment of any disease, and has been called a "quack remedy." Although a number of compounds labelled "pangamic acid" have been studied or sold, no chemical compound, including those claimed by the Krebses to be pangamic acid, has been scientifically verified to have the characteristics that defined the original description of the compound.

=== Amygdalin and laetrile ===
Amygdalin, C_{20}H_{27}NO_{11}, is a glycoside initially isolated from the seeds of a cultivar of the almond tree, Prunus dulcis var. amara, also known as bitter almonds, by Pierre-Jean Robiquet and Antoine-François Boutron-Charlard (1796–1879) in 1830, and subsequently investigated by Liebig and Wöhler in 1830, and others.

It was promoted in a modified form called laetrile as a cancer cure by Ernst T. Krebs, Jr. under the name "Vitamin B17," but studies have found it to be ineffective. It is also not a vitamin and can cause cyanide poisoning. The promotion of laetrile to treat cancer has been described in the scientific literature as a canonical example of quackery, with Irving Lerner of the University of Minnesota describing it as "the slickest, most sophisticated, and certainly the most remunerative cancer quack promotion in medical history."
