= Magnesium oil =

Magnesium chloride hexahydrate

Magnesium "oil" (also referred to as transdermal magnesium, magnesium hexahydrate) is a colloquial misnomer for a concentrated solution of magnesium chloride in water. It is oily only in the sense that it feels oily to the touch, but unlike a true oil it mixes freely with water—as it must, being an aqueous solution. Magnesium oil is supposed to be applied to the skin as an alternative to taking a magnesium supplement by mouth, although it is ineffective and scientifically unsupported due to lack of any convincing data that magnesium is absorbed in significant amounts through the skin.
