= Pangamic acid =

Hypothetical chemical compound

d-gluconodimethylamino acetic acid
- Chemical structure of d-gluconodimethylamino acetic acid, a structure of "pangamic acid" proposed in 1951

Names
- IUPAC name 6-O-(N,N-dimethylglycinyl)-D-gluconic acid
- Systematic IUPAC name (2R,3S,4R,5R)-6-[(Dimethylamino)acetyl]-2,3,4,5-tetrahydroxyhexanoic acid
- Other names dimethylglycine d-gluconic acid ester

Identifiers
CAS Number	20858-86-0
3D model (JSmol)	Interactive image
ChEMBL	ChEMBL3707449
ChemSpider	32700433
EC Number	236-087-9
PubChem CID	45934203
UNII	MPQ53A9F5C
- InChI: InChI=1S/C10H19NO8/c1-11(2)3-6(13)19-4-5(12)7(14)8(15)9(16)10(17)18/h5,7-9,12,14-16H,3-4H2,1-2H3,(H,17,18)/t5-,7-,8+,9-/m1/s1 Key: ZQTHOIGMSJMBLM-BUJSFMDZSA-N
- SMILES: CN(C)CC(=O)OC[C@H]([C@H]([C@@H]([C@H](C(=O)O)O)O)O)O

Properties
Chemical formula	C_{10}H_{19}NO_{8}
Molar mass	281.261 g·mol^{−1}
- Except where otherwise noted, data are given for materials in their standard state (at 25 °C [77 °F], 100 kPa). Infobox references

Pangamic acid, also called pangamate, is the name given to a chemical compound discovered by Ernst T. Krebs Sr. His son, Ernst T. Krebs Jr., promoted it as a medicinal compound for use in treatment of a wide range of diseases. They also termed this chemical "vitamin B_{15}", though it is not a true vitamin, has no nutritional value, has no known use in the treatment of any disease, and has been called a "quack remedy". Although a number of compounds labelled "pangamic acid" have been studied or sold (including the 1951 d-gluconodimethylamino acetic acid), no chemical compound, including those claimed by the Krebses to be pangamic acid, has been scientifically verified to have the characteristics that defined the original description of the compound.

The Krebses derived the term "pangamic" to describe this compound which they asserted to be ubiquitous and highly concentrated in seeds (pan meaning "universal" and gamic meaning "seed").

== Chemistry ==
Pangamic acid is the name given to the chemical compound with the empirical formula C_{10}H_{19}O_{8}N and a molecular weight of 281 which appeared to be an ester derived from d-gluconic acid and dimethylglycine. In 1943, the Krebses applied for a patent for a process for extracting this chemical compound which they reported had been previously isolated from apricot seeds, and received the patent in 1949. A 1951 paper by the Krebses reported the first isolation of this compound using this patented process, but did not include enough information to confirm that this compound was actually isolated. In 1955, the Krebses received a patent for another synthesizing process for "N-substituted glycine esters of gluconic acid", but the patent contained no supporting data to confirm the process was able to synthesize compounds described by the patent, including pangamic acid.

Subsequent attempts at synthesizing this ester by other researchers found Krebs' purported methods of producing pangamic acid were not reproducible, and research into pangamic acid have focused on compounds of various chemical compositions. A review noted that of all the chemicals described in research about pangamic acid, "[n]ot a single product labeled 'pangamate' or 'B_{15}' has been established in a scientifically verifiable manner to conform to the empiric formula" described by the Krebses. Analysis of a sample of a compound called "pangamic acid" which was provided by a co-worker of the Krebses in the 1950s showed only lactose upon further evaluation by nuclear magnetic resonance spectroscopy. Thus, "pangamic acid" is more a label used to describe one of any number of chemical compounds rather than a particular substance.

Chemical compounds sold as "pangamic acid" for medicinal purposes have also had various chemical compositions, and suppliers of "pangamic acid" have regularly changed the identity of the chemical compounds sold under this label. One anecdote noted that the Food and Drug Administration (FDA) has seized lots of "calcium pangamate" sold by General Nutrition Center (GNC), which agreed to stop selling the compound in those bottles after the FDA filed suit to stop sales. Afterwards, it was noted that GNC was still selling something in the same bottles with the same labels, likely a different compound. Due to ambiguity in situations like this, the FDA considers it "not an identifiable substance".

To summarize, substances that have been claimed to be pangamic acid include:

- d-gluconodimethylamino acetic acid (Krebes 1951), never synthesized. Alternative Soviet synthesis of calcium salt also fails to reproduce.
- Variety of mixtures containing dimethylamine. Result of attempts to synthesize the 1951 compound. Possibly mutagenic.
- Diisopropylamine dichloroacetate (Krebes 1955 patent "analogue"), synthesized. Readily hydrolyzes to known-toxic compounds.
- Pharmacologically inert materials, ranging from "synthesis attempts" containing calcium gluconate to pure lactose.

== Clinical claims and research ==
The Krebses' original patent claimed pangamic acid could be used for detoxification as well as treatment of asthma, skin conditions, joint pain, and nerve pain, with none of these claims supported by evidence in the patent application. Early promotion for pangamic acid included use by race horses as well as humans. Although given the name "Vitamin B_{15}" by the Krebses, there is no evidence that it meets the definition of a vitamin as there is no evidence it is a nutrient needed by the body.

Much of the clinical research on pangamic acid took place in the former Soviet Union, though that research often did not describe which of the many compounds called "pangamic acid" was used in the study. This research was also of limited quality due to being overwhelmingly anecdotal in nature (as opposed to controlled experimentation) and ignoring short and long term safety in human use.

Although more recent claims include treatment of a wide variety of conditions including cancer, heart disease, schizophrenia as well as providing improvement in oxygen utilization, there is no significant evidence for any of these claims or that it is safe for human use. One review noted that it meets "the criteria that define a quack remedy".

== Safety ==
Positive results from mutagenicity analysis via the Ames test of compounds commonly found in preparations labelled "pangamic acid" including diisopropylamine dichloroacetate, diisopropylamine, dichloroacetate, as well as dimethylglycine mixed with sodium nitrite suggests there may be concern for the development of cancer with the use of these substances.

== Legal status ==
The FDA has recommended seizing any chemicals advertised as pangamic acid and restraining the importation and interstate shipment of pangamic acid on the grounds that pangamic acid and pangamic acid products are unsafe for use and have no known nutritional properties. Pangamic acid's distribution in Canada has been prohibited by the then-named Canadian Food and Drug Directorate.

== See also ==
- List of unproven and disproven cancer treatments
