= Calcium pangamate =

Chemical compound

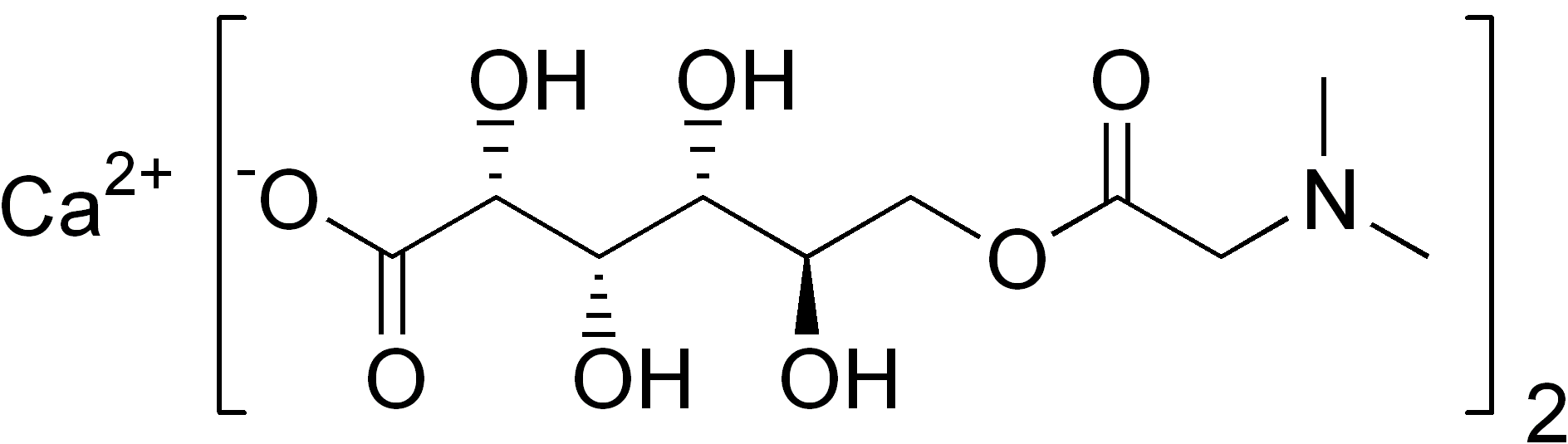

Clinical data
- ATC code: A12AA11 (WHO)

Identifiers
- IUPAC name: Calcium 6-(2-dimethylamino-acetoxy)-2,3,4,5-tetrahydroxy-hexanoate
- CAS Number: 20310-61-6
- ChemSpider: 26333260
- UNII: 492G10Q871

Chemical and physical data
- Formula: Ca(C_{10}H_{18}NO_{8})_{2}
- 3D model (JSmol): Interactive image
- SMILES: CN(C)CC(=O)OC[C@H]([C@H]([C@@H]([C@H](C(=O)[O-])O)O)O)O.CN(C)CC(=O)OC[C@H]([C@H]([C@@H]([C@H](C(=O)[O-])O)O)O)O.[Ca+2]
- InChI: InChI=1S/2C10H19NO8.Ca/c2*1-11(2)3-6(13)19-4-5(12)7(14)8(15)9(16)10(17)18;/h2*5,7-9,12,14-16H,3-4H2,1-2H3,(H,17,18);/q;;+2/p-2/t2*5-,7-,8+,9-;/m11./s1; Key:JWLAOERSRUNGEF-JQVJEGKNSA-L

Calcium pangamate is a mineral supplement. It is sometimes used as a synonym for pangamic acid.
