= Calcium glucoheptonate =

Chemical compound

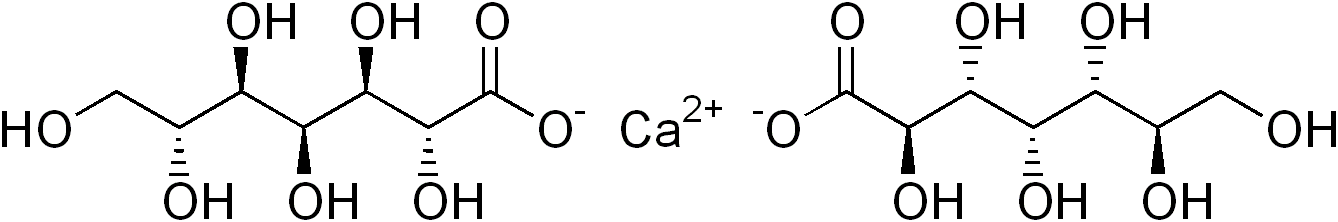

Clinical data
- AHFS/Drugs.com: International Drug Names
- ATC code: A12AA10 (WHO)

Identifiers
- IUPAC name: calcium (2R,3R,4S,5R,6R)-2,3,4,5,6,7-hexahydroxyheptanoate
- CAS Number: 29039-00-7
- PubChem CID: 28327
- DrugBank: DB00326
- ChemSpider: 16741933
- UNII: L11651398J
- CompTox Dashboard (EPA): DTXSID30951637
- ECHA InfoCard: 100.044.880

Chemical and physical data
- Formula: C_{14}H_{26}CaO_{16}
- Molar mass: 490.424 g·mol^{−1}
- 3D model (JSmol): Interactive image
- SMILES: [Ca+2].O[C@@H]([C@H](O)[C@@H](O)C([O-])=O)[C@H](O)C(O)CO.[O-]C(=O)[C@H](O)[C@@H](O)[C@H](O)[C@H](O)C(O)CO
- InChI: InChI=1S/2C7H14O8.Ca/c2*8-1-2(9)3(10)4(11)5(12)6(13)7(14)15;/h2*2-6,8-13H,1H2,(H,14,15);/q;;+2/p-2/t2*2?,3-,4-,5+,6-;/m11./s1; Key:FATUQANACHZLRT-YTESCSPLSA-L

Calcium glucoheptonate is a highly water soluble mineral supplement.
