= Magnesium orotate =

Chemical compound

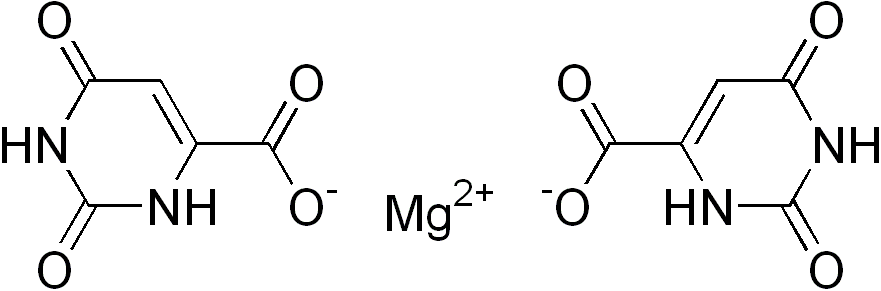

Clinical data
- AHFS/Drugs.com: Consumer Drug Information
- ATC code: A12CC09 (WHO)

Identifiers
- IUPAC name: magnesium 2,6-dioxo-3H-pyrimidine-4-carboxylate
- CAS Number: 34717-03-8
- PubChem CID: 3036905
- ChemSpider: 2300801
- UNII: GI96W46M5A
- CompTox Dashboard (EPA): DTXSID20905129
- ECHA InfoCard: 100.047.410

Chemical and physical data
- Formula: C_{10}H_{6}MgN_{4}O_{8}
- Molar mass: 334.483 g·mol^{−1}
- 3D model (JSmol): Interactive image
- SMILES: [Mg+2].O=C([O-])\C1=C\C(=O)NC(=O)N1.[O-]C(=O)\C1=C\C(=O)NC(=O)N1
- InChI: InChI=1S/2C5H4N2O4.Mg/c2*8-3-1-2(4(9)10)6-5(11)7-3;/h2*1H,(H,9,10)(H2,6,7,8,11);/q;;+2/p-2; Key:QWLHYYKDLOVBNV-UHFFFAOYSA-L

Magnesium orotate, the magnesium salt of orotic acid, is a mineral supplement. It can be used in treating extracellular magnesium deficiency, as well as in mitigating magnesium depletion that inhibits the binding of adenosine triphosphate via orotic acid, which provides binding sites.
