= ATC code A12 =

ATC code A12 Mineral supplements is a therapeutic subgroup of the Anatomical Therapeutic Chemical Classification System, a system of alphanumeric codes developed by the World Health Organization (WHO) for the classification of drugs and other medical products. Subgroup A12 is part of the anatomical group A Alimentary tract and metabolism.

Codes for veterinary use (ATCvet codes) can be created by placing the letter Q in front of the human ATC code: for example, QA12. ATCvet codes without corresponding human ATC codes are cited with the leading Q in the following list.
National versions of the ATC classification may include additional codes not present in this list, which follows the WHO version.

== A12A Calcium ==
=== A12AA Calcium ===
A12AA01 Calcium phosphate
A12AA02 Calcium glubionate
A12AA03 Calcium gluconate
A12AA04 Calcium carbonate
A12AA05 Calcium lactate
A12AA06 Calcium lactate gluconate
A12AA07 Calcium chloride
A12AA08 Calcium glycerylphosphate
A12AA09 Calcium citrate lysine complex
A12AA10 Calcium glucoheptonate
A12AA11 Calcium pangamate
A12AA13 Calcium citrate
A12AA20 Calcium (different salts in combination)
A12AA30 Calcium laevulate

== A12B Potassium ==
=== A12BA Potassium ===
A12BA01 Potassium chloride
A12BA02 Potassium citrate
A12BA03 Potassium hydrogentartrate
A12BA04 Potassium hydrogencarbonate
A12BA05 Potassium gluconate
A12BA30 Potassium (different salts in combination)
A12BA51 Potassium, combinations

== A12C Other mineral supplements ==
=== A12CA Sodium ===
A12CA01 Sodium chloride or saline (medicine)
A12CA02 Sodium sulfate

=== A12CB Zinc ===
A12CB01 Zinc sulfate
A12CB02 Zinc gluconate
A12CB03 Zinc protein complex
A12CB04 Zinc orotate

=== A12CC Magnesium ===
A12CC01 Magnesium chloride
A12CC02 Magnesium sulfate
A12CC03 Magnesium gluconate
A12CC04 Magnesium citrate
A12CC05 Magnesium aspartate
A12CC06 Magnesium lactate
A12CC07 Magnesium levulinate
A12CC08 Magnesium pidolate
A12CC09 Magnesium orotate
A12CC10 Magnesium oxide
A12CC30 Magnesium (different salts in combination)

=== A12CD Fluoride ===
A12CD01 Sodium fluoride
A12CD02 Sodium monofluorophosphate
A12CD51 Fluoride, combinations

=== A12CE Selenium ===
A12CE01 Sodium selenate
A12CE02 Sodium selenite
QA12CE99 Selenium, combinations

=== A12CX Other mineral products ===
QA12CX90 Toldimfos
QA12CX91 Butafosfan
QA12CX99 Other mineral products, combinations
