= Magnesium pidolate =

Chemical compound

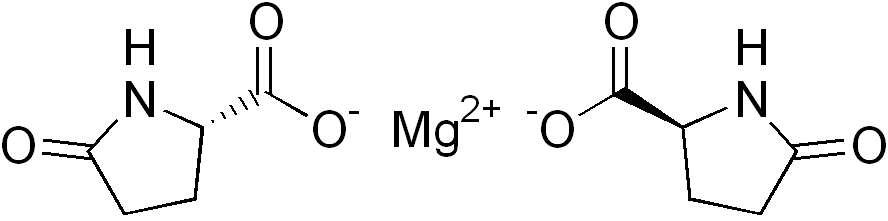

Clinical data
- AHFS/Drugs.com: Consumer Drug Information
- ATC code: A12CC08 (WHO)

Identifiers
- IUPAC name: Magnesium 5-oxopyrrolidine-2-carboxylate
- CAS Number: 135701-98-3
- PubChem CID: 9838620
- ChemSpider: 8014340
- UNII: V5PC588N7G
- CompTox Dashboard (EPA): DTXSID30905130
- ECHA InfoCard: 100.080.955

Chemical and physical data
- Formula: C_{10}H_{12}MgN_{2}O_{6}
- Molar mass: 280.519 g·mol^{−1}
- 3D model (JSmol): Interactive image
- SMILES: [Mg+2].[O-]C(=O)C1NC(=O)CC1.[O-]C(=O)C1NC(=O)CC1
- InChI: InChI=1S/2C5H7NO3.Mg/c2*7-4-2-1-3(6-4)5(8)9;/h2*3H,1-2H2,(H,6,7)(H,8,9);/q;;+2/p-2; Key:JQAACYUZYRBHGG-UHFFFAOYSA-L

Magnesium pidolate, the magnesium salt of pidolic acid (also known as pyroglutamic acid), is a mineral supplement, which contains 8.6% magnesium w/w.
