= Emily Mariko =

American social media influencer (born 1992)

- Born: January 9, 1992 (age 34); Los Angeles, California
- Other name: Emily Mariko
- Education: Columbia University
- Occupation: Internet personality

TikTok information
- Page: emilymariko
- Followers: 12.4 million
- Last updated: May 12, 2025

Emily Mariko (born January 9, 1992) is a social media influencer who gained attention in the summer of 2021 for her cooking and lifestyle TikToks, particularly her salmon and rice bowls.

== Early life ==
Mariko was born in Los Angeles. She attended Columbia University in New York City and graduated in 2014 with a degree in neuroscience. She worked at L’Oréal and Facebook before leaving to become a full-time YouTuber.

== Career ==
When Mariko pursued social media part-time, she called her YouTube channel “Sharewear” and was focused on fashion and lifestyle content. When she left Facebook, she renamed her channel to her full name. She began posting on TikTok in March 2020, while already a full-time YouTuber. In the summer of 2021, Mariko gained attention for her salmon bowl recipe, which consists of leftover salmon, white rice, soy sauce, kewpie mayonnaise, nori, and kimchi. In videos, Mariko heated the rice in the microwave with an ice cube and parchment paper. At the height of the salmon videos' popularity, Mariko gained a million TikTok followers in several days. Mashable described her account's content as "nearly mundane but soothingly organized".

She frequently posts about exercise, cleaning, and cooking.

In 2024, she launched an online shop called Emily Mariko. Its first and only product was a large tote bag that was sold for US$120. Despite attracting attention for its high price, the tote bag quickly sold out.

== Personal life ==
Emily Mariko became engaged to her longtime partner, Matt Rickard, in October 2021. The couple married on July 22, 2023 in Rancho Palos Verdes, California in a venue that viewers recognized as the same venue as Caleb and Julie’s wedding in the television series The O.C. Her wedding was widely discussed on social media and was noted for exemplifying "quiet luxury". The wedding was hailed as one of the top social media events of 2023 by The New York Times. In December 2023, she announced her pregnancy with her and Rickard's first child. Their son, Theodore, was born on June 15, 2024. Mariko announced her pregnancy with her second son in late 2025. In May 2026, Mariko announced the arrival of her son, Clifford.
