= Magnesium lactate =

Chemical compound

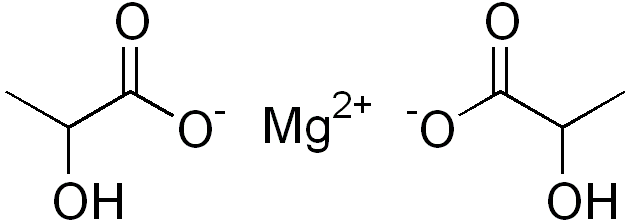

Clinical data
- AHFS/Drugs.com: Consumer Drug Information
- ATC code: A12CC06 (WHO)

Identifiers
- IUPAC name: magnesium 2-hydroxypropanoate
- CAS Number: 18917-93-6
- PubChem CID: 6536825
- ChemSpider: 4477551
- UNII: MT6QI8324A
- E number: E329 (antioxidants, ...)
- CompTox Dashboard (EPA): DTXSID20872620
- ECHA InfoCard: 100.038.777

Chemical and physical data
- Formula: C_{6}H_{10}MgO_{6}
- Molar mass: 202.445 g·mol^{−1}
- 3D model (JSmol): Interactive image
- Solubility in water: 77.6mg/mL
- SMILES: [Mg+2].[O-]C(=O)C(O)C.[O-]C(=O)C(O)C
- InChI: InChI=1S/2C3H6O3.Mg/c2*1-2(4)3(5)6;/h2*2,4H,1H3,(H,5,6);/q;;+2/p-2; Key:OVGXLJDWSLQDRT-UHFFFAOYSA-L

Magnesium lactate, the magnesium salt of lactic acid.

== Mineral supplement ==
Magnesium lactate can be used as a mineral supplement to prevent and treat low amounts of magnesium in the blood.

Magnesium lactate may help treat leg muscle cramps in pregnancy.

== Food additive ==
As a food additive, it has the E number E329 and is used in food and beverages as an acidity regulator.
