= Magnesium gluconate =

Names
- IUPAC name Magnesium bis[(2R,3S,4R,5R)-2,3,4,5,6-pentahydroxyhexanoate]

Identifiers
| CAS Number | 3632-91-5 |
| 3D model (JSmol) | Interactive image |
| ChEMBL | ChEMBL2107145 |
| ChemSpider | 9593457 |
| ECHA InfoCard | 100.020.772 |
| E number | E580 (acidity regulators, ...) |
| PubChem CID | 11418570 |
| UNII | TH52F4317B |
| CompTox Dashboard (EPA) | DTXSID50890579 |
- InChI: InChI=1S/2C6H12O7.Mg/c2*7-1-2(8)3(9)4(10)5(11)6(12)13;/h2*2-5,7-11H,1H2,(H,12,13);/q;;+2/p-2/t2*2-,3-,4+,5-;/m11./s1
- SMILES: [Mg+2].[O-]C(=O)[C@H](O)[C@@H](O)[C@H](O)[C@H](O)CO.[O-]C(=O)[C@H](O)[C@@H](O)[C@H](O)[C@H](O)CO

Properties
| Chemical formula | C_{12}H_{22}MgO_{14} |
| Molar mass | 414.599 g·mol^{−1} |

Pharmacology
| ATC code | A12CC03 (WHO) |
- Except where otherwise noted, data are given for materials in their standard state (at 25 °C [77 °F], 100 kPa). Infobox references

Magnesium gluconate is a compound with formula Mg(C_{6}H_{11}O_{7})_{2}. It is the magnesium salt of gluconic acid.

According to one study, magnesium gluconate showed the highest level of bioavailability of any magnesium salt which implies its viability as a supplement, although of the 10 salts studied, all increased magnesium levels significantly. This study did not include magnesium glycinate, which is one of the most bioavailable forms of magnesium.

It has E number "E580".

== Use in medicine ==
There are data on the pharmacological properties of magnesium gluconate. Gluconic acid is the initial substrate for the reactions of pentose phosphate path of oxidation of glucose, so it was suggested that it may affect the energy metabolism of mitochondria. In Ukraine, magnesium gluconate, together with potassium gluconate in the drug Rhythmocor is used to treat heart disease. Pilot studies have shown efficacy in various cardiac arrhythmia. Whether these effects are from the influence of gluconic acid on the metabolism of the heart or from the influence of magnesium and potassium on osmotic pressure is unknown.
