= Magnesium glycinate =

Names
- IUPAC name Magnesium diglycinate
- Systematic IUPAC name Magnesium bis(aminoacetate)

Identifiers
| CAS Number | 14783-68-7 |
| 3D model (JSmol) | Interactive image |
| ChemSpider | 76358 |
| DrugBank | DB11189 |
| ECHA InfoCard | 100.035.305 |
| EC Number | 238-852-2 |
| PubChem CID | 84645 |
| UNII | IFN18A4Y6B |
| CompTox Dashboard (EPA) | DTXSID90163815 |
- InChI: InChI=1S/2C2H5NO2.Mg/c2*3-1-2(4)5;/h2*1,3H2,(H,4,5);/q;;+2/p-2 Key: AACACXATQSKRQG-UHFFFAOYSA-L
- SMILES: C(C(=O)[O-])N.C(C(=O)[O-])N.[Mg+2]

Properties
| Chemical formula | C_{4}H_{8}MgN_{2}O_{4} |
| Molar mass | 172.423 g·mol^{−1} |
- Except where otherwise noted, data are given for materials in their standard state (at 25 °C [77 °F], 100 kPa). (what is ?) Infobox references

Magnesium glycinate, also known as magnesium diglycinate or magnesium bisglycinate, is the magnesium salt of glycinate. The compound is sold as a dietary supplement intended to relieve magnesium deficiency. It is an ingredient in cosmetics products. It contains 14.1% elemental magnesium by mass.

Magnesium glycinate is often "buffered" with magnesium oxide, but it is also available in its pure non-buffered form.

== Chemical structure ==
According to X-ray crystallography, magnesium glycinate may exist in several forms, often with other anions.

== See also ==
- Magnesium (medication)
- Magnesium in biology
