= Biodegradable magnesium implants =

Temporary orthopaedic devices

Biodegradable magnesium implants (also referred to as bioabsorbable magnesium implants, resorbable magnesium implants, or degradable magnesium implants) are temporary surgical implants fabricated from magnesium and its alloys that gradually dissolve within the body's physiological environment during and after bone healing. Unlike conventional permanent implants made from titanium or stainless steel, a bioabsorbable device is designed to degrade once the bone has healed, eliminating the need for a secondary surgical removal procedure.

Magnesium is the fourth most abundant cation in the human body and an essential component of bone mineral, contributing to its inherent biocompatibility. Its elastic modulus (41–45 GPa) is considerably closer to that of cortical bone (10–30 GPa) than conventional permanent metallic biomaterials such as titanium alloys (~110 GPa) or stainless steel (~200 GPa), reducing the stress shielding effect that can inhibit bone remodelling and lead to bone resorption. Beyond passive compatibility, magnesium ions released during degradation have been shown to actively promote osteogenesis, stimulate angiogenesis, and modulate immune responses in the bone microenvironment.

The principal clinical forms include screws, pins, plates, and intramedullary nails used in fracture fixation, as well as bioresorbable coronary scaffolds. The first regulatory-approved resorbable metallic orthopaedic implant—the MAGNEZIX® compression screw (Syntellix AG, Germany)—received CE marking in 2013. As of 2026, multiple companies across Europe, Asia, and North America hold approved or breakthrough-designated products, targeting markets in orthopaedic trauma and spinal surgery valued in excess of USD 9 billion.

Despite growing clinical adoption, challenges related to corrosion rate control, stress corrosion cracking (SCC), hydrogen gas evolution, and regulatory standardisation continue to restrict broader deployment. An active area of research involves developing quantitative design parameters—such as SCC stress thresholds—to support safe implant design beyond comparative susceptibility ranking.

== History ==
The clinical exploration of biodegradable magnesium implants originated in the late nineteenth century, driven by the metal's unique resorption properties. In 1878, physician Edward C. Huse first utilized magnesium wires as ligatures to arrest bleeding from vessels. Subsequent pioneering work was conducted by Austrian surgeon Erwin Payr, who, beginning in 1900, engineered absorbable magnesium tubular stents to facilitate vascular anastomosis and nerve repair. Similarly, in 1906, Belgian surgeon Albin Lambotte conducted the first documented clinical trial of magnesium in orthopedics, utilizing a pure magnesium plate and steel screws to stabilize a pediatric tibia-fibula fracture. However, these early clinical applications were severely limited by magnesium's high in vivo corrosion rate. The rapid degradation not only resulted in a premature loss of the implant's mechanical integrity before tissue healing could occur, but also drove a localized electrochemical reaction that released excessive volumes of hydrogen gas, forming extensive subcutaneous gas cavities. Interest was comprehensively revived from the 1990s and particularly during the 2000s as advances in alloy design, surface engineering, and characterisation techniques made controlled degradation achievable. Research expanded in two principal directions: (1) orthopaedic fracture fixation devices; and (2) cardiovascular resorbable scaffolds. The regulatory milestone came in 2013, when Syntellix AG (Hannover, Germany) received CE marking for its MAGNEZIX® compression screws—the first resorbable metallic orthopaedic implant approved for human use worldwide. The same year, Biotronik received CE marking for the first generation of its absorbable magnesium coronary stent. K-MET screws (K-MET Co., Ltd., Republic of Korea) received approval from the Korean Food and Drug Administration in 2015 for distal radius fracture repair. By 2016, MAGNEZIX® had been used in more than 25,000 patients in a single year. Ian Technology (China) obtained CE certification for its high-purity magnesium (HP-Mg) bone screw in 2020, and Bioretec Oy (Finland) received US FDA clearance for its RemeOs™ trauma screw in March 2023 and CE marking in January 2025.

== Properties of magnesium relevant to bone implantation ==
=== Mechanical properties ===
The elastic modulus of magnesium alloys (41–45 GPa) falls between that of cortical bone (10–30 GPa) and cancellous bone (~0.1–5 GPa), representing a substantially better mechanical match than titanium or steel. This reduces stress shielding—where a much stiffer implant bears a disproportionate share of load, depriving the adjacent bone of mechanobiological stimulation needed for remodelling.

The density of magnesium (~1.74 g/cm³) is close to that of cortical bone (~1.75–2.0 g/cm³), giving implants a high strength-to-weight ratio (tensile: ~158 kN·m/kg) and, in orthopaedic contexts, reducing implant-related inertia during patient activity. Tensile and compressive strengths of processed alloys are broadly adequate for temporary load-sharing fixation (typically 150–300 MPa depending on composition and processing route), though load-bearing applications such as femoral fixation and spinal instrumentation remain challenging owing to the difficulty of reliably achieving yield strengths above 200 MPa in all product geometries.

=== Biocompatibility ===
Approximately half of the body's total magnesium resides in bone, and Mg²⁺ ions are involved in hundreds of enzymatic reactions. The primary degradation products—Mg²⁺ ions and magnesium hydroxide—are not inherently cytotoxic and are excreted via the kidneys. Clinical studies have generally shown that serum magnesium and calcium concentrations are not significantly altered by the presence of degrading Mg implants.

Beyond passive biocompatibility, Mg²⁺ ions released during degradation promote new bone formation through stimulation of osteoblast differentiation and migration, encourage angiogenesis in regenerating bone, and exert immunomodulatory effects via macrophage polarisation towards a pro-healing (M2) phenotype. A 2024 study in Nature Biomedical Engineering reported that Mg²⁺ ions from resorbable screws upregulated osteocalcin expression in human mesenchymal stem cells by 3.2-fold, accelerating callus maturation in rat femoral fractures. These osteostimulatory properties are a distinctive advantage over biologically inert permanent metallic implants.

=== Biodegradation mechanism ===
In the chloride-rich environment of physiological fluids, magnesium degrades electrochemically. The predominant overall reaction is:

Mg + 2H₂O → Mg(OH)₂ + H₂↑

The magnesium hydroxide (brucite) film that forms on the surface is partially protective but susceptible to dissolution by chloride ions, which convert it to the more soluble MgCl₂. This is accompanied by the local evolution of hydrogen gas. Uncoated pure magnesium degrades at rates of roughly 2–4 mm/year in simulated body fluid, which is too rapid for most clinical applications. The degradation rate is influenced by alloy composition, microstructure, second-phase distribution, surface condition, local pH, protein adsorption, and ionic concentrations in the surrounding physiological medium.

== Alloy systems ==
The performance of a magnesium implant depends critically on alloy composition, which governs mechanical strength, corrosion rate, and biological response. Commercial magnesium alloys are broadly classified into Mg–Al, Mg–Ca, Mg–Zn, Mg–Mn, Mg–Sr, Mg–Zr, Mg–RE (rare-earth), and multicomponent systems. For biomedical use, aluminium-free and rare-earth-free compositions have attracted increasing interest on safety grounds.

=== Pure magnesium ===
High-purity magnesium (HP-Mg, ≥99.9%) has been investigated and clinically applied because the absence of alloying elements minimises cytotoxicity concerns. HP-Mg exhibits relatively uniform corrosion, and Ian Technology (China) received CE certification in 2020 for an HP-Mg bone fixation screw. Its principal limitations are modest mechanical strength and a relatively rapid degradation rate that is difficult to tailor without alloying.

=== Mg–Al–Zn alloys ===
Alloys of the AZ series (e.g., AZ31, AZ61, AZ91D) were among the first investigated due to their well-established room-temperature mechanical properties and industrial familiarity. Aluminium has the highest solid solubility in magnesium (~12.7 wt%), enabling solid-solution strengthening and precipitation of the β-Mg₁₇Al₁₂ phase. However, concerns about potential cytotoxicity and neurotoxicity of aluminium ions accumulating locally near the implant have substantially limited clinical enthusiasm for this series in long-term biodegradable applications. More recent work on the Biotronik Freesolve™ third-generation scaffold has revealed that the speciation and systemic mobilisation of aluminium from Mg–Al alloys are critically dictated by microstructural design, with peak-aged alloys favouring localised particulate release over systemic ionic exposure.

=== Mg–Ca binary alloys ===
Calcium is an essential element in the human body and the principal mineral constituent of bone, making Mg–Ca alloys conceptually appealing for physiological compatibility. Calcium refines grain structure and promotes corrosion-resistant Mg₂Ca intermetallic formation. Mechanical properties and corrosion resistance are best when calcium content is kept below 1 wt%; at higher levels, the volume fraction of the cathodic Mg₂Ca phase increases, accelerating galvanic corrosion. During in-vivo breakdown, calcium phosphate precipitates form that promote bone mineralisation. Binary Mg–Ca alloys were among the earliest truly biocompatible candidate systems studied and form the conceptual basis for many ternary compositions.

=== Mg–Zn binary alloys ===
Zinc is an essential trace element involved in bone formation and enzyme function. Addition of Zn to magnesium increases yield strength (through solid-solution and precipitation hardening) and reduces corrosion rate by forming protective surface films; Mg–Zn alloys exhibit high biocompatibility and are considered among the clinically safest Mg-based systems. Maximum elongation (~15.8%) is typically achieved at Zn concentrations up to about 4–6 wt%. Mg–Zn alloys have been evaluated for interference screws and fracture fixation pins, and the class forms the binary backbone of the widely studied Mg–Zn–Ca ternary family.

=== Mg–Ca–Zn ternary alloys ===
Ternary Mg–Ca–Zn alloys have attracted substantial research interest as they combine the physiological compatibility of both calcium and zinc without either aluminium or rare-earth elements. Microstructural studies show the formation of Mg₂Ca and Mg₆Ca₂Zn intermetallic compounds. In-vitro cytotoxicity studies have demonstrated cell viability of 95–99% for compositions in the range of 0.5–1 wt% Ca and 1–4 wt% Zn, establishing that these are suitable for biomedical use. Optimal compositions for the balance of corrosion resistance and mechanical strength are considered to lie in the range 0.3–0.8 wt% Ca and 0.5–4 wt% Zn. Dilute compositions such as Mg–0.6Zn–0.5Ca (ZX00) and ZXM100 have been specifically engineered for resorbable cardiovascular and orthopaedic applications; ZX00 demonstrated significantly higher fibroblast viability than WE43 in vitro, and degraded through uniform rather than localised corrosion mechanisms, retaining superior ductility after five months of in-vivo implantation.

Detailed microstructural characterisation of the Mg–0.45Zn–0.45Ca alloy in heat-treated and thermo-mechanically processed conditions has shown that processing route significantly influences grain size, second-phase distribution, and corrosion behaviour—underscoring the importance of post-processing for achieving clinically adequate degradation rates and mechanical properties.

Clinically, the K-MET® screw (K-MET Co., Ltd., Republic of Korea), approved by the Korean FDA in 2015, is based on a Mg–Ca–Zn system (nominally Mg–5Ca–1Zn) and achieved complete degradation at 6–18 months in clinical follow-up. Bioretec Oy (Finland) has developed the proprietary ZXM100-related Mg–Zn–Ca alloy underpinning the RemeOs™ product line, which has received both US FDA clearance (2023) and CE marking (2025).

=== Mg–rare earth (Mg–RE) alloys ===
Alloys incorporating yttrium, neodymium, gadolinium, zirconium, and related rare-earth elements combine refined microstructure with improved elevated-temperature strength and corrosion resistance. The WE43 alloy (nominally Mg–3.8Y–2.2Nd–0.49Gd–0.23Zr, wt%) is the most extensively studied biomedical Mg–RE alloy. It contains secondary intermetallic phases Mg₄₁Nd₅, Mg₁₂Nd, Mg₂₄Y₅, and Mg₅Gd distributed within grains and at grain boundaries, which provide microstructural refinement but also introduce micro-galvanic heterogeneity that can accelerate localised corrosion and stress corrosion cracking. WE43 forms the metallurgical basis for clinically deployed devices including the MAGNEZIX® screw (Syntellix AG) and the Magmaris® coronary scaffold (Biotronik).

However, RE alloys face growing scrutiny owing to evidence that rare-earth elements can accumulate within mammalian organs. A longitudinal study found 10–20-fold increases in RE concentrations in rabbit organs following LAE442 implantation compared with controls, and degradation byproducts of WE43 have been observed to persist as non-degradable residues at implantation sites years after the device has fully resorbed. These findings have motivated the development of RE-free alloy systems—including Mg–Zn–Ca, Mg–Mn–Zn, and Mg–Zn–Ca–Sn quaternary alloys—as safer long-term alternatives.

=== Mg–Sr alloys ===
Strontium shares chemical properties with calcium and magnesium, and nearly all of the body's strontium is stored in bone. Strontium additions to Mg alloys refine grains, improve corrosion resistance through modification of the secondary phase distribution, and promote osteogenic activity through strontium's established pharmacological effects on bone formation. Mg–Sr alloys and multicomponent Mg–Zn–Sr and Mg–Zn–Zr–Sr systems have been evaluated for fracture fixation, and Mg–0.5Sr was found to degrade at a slower rate than more complex alloys in some in-vivo comparisons.

=== Mg–Mn alloys and Mg–Mn-containing multicomponent alloys ===
Manganese is a trace element that promotes the formation of a protective oxide film that inhibits chloride-ion infiltration. Mg–Mn alloys and compositions containing Mn additions (e.g., Mg–2Zn–1Mn, Mg–Mn–Zn) have attracted interest because they achieve substantially reduced and more predictable degradation rates. Mg–2Zn–1Mn has been reported to achieve stable degradation of approximately 0.36 mm/year in simulated body fluid, representing a 100–1000-fold improvement over historical unmodified magnesium; the ten-fold variability previously observed with less optimised alloys was eliminated. However, concerns about neurotoxicity and ototoxicity of manganese must be managed through appropriate compositional limits.

=== Mg–Zr alloys ===
Zirconium is effective at refining Mg grain structure and improving corrosion resistance through grain boundary modification. Zirconium cannot be co-alloyed with aluminium or manganese because these elements form stable compounds with Zr, consuming it from the matrix. Al-free, Mn-free Mg–Zr-based alloys—including the Mg–Y–RE–Zr system (i.e., WE43)—therefore represent the primary route to Zr-containing biomedical alloys. Micro-additions of Zr (below ~0.5 wt%) are also used in emerging Mg–Zn–Ca–Zr quaternary designs intended to combine biological safety with competitive mechanical properties.

=== Mg–Ag alloys ===
Silver additions confer antibacterial properties to magnesium alloys, arising from Ag⁺ ion release during degradation. Mg–Ag alloys have been studied for implant-associated infection prevention, where the risk of post-surgical osteomyelitis remains significant. The cytotoxicity of silver at elevated concentrations must be carefully managed, and this alloy class has not yet entered widespread clinical use.

== Processing and microstructural engineering ==
The performance of a magnesium implant alloy is governed not only by composition but also by the processing route used to produce the final component.

=== Heat treatment ===
Solution treatment followed by ageing dissolves coarse as-cast intermetallic phases, homogenises the matrix, and allows controlled reprecipitation of fine, dispersed secondary phases on ageing. This improves both mechanical properties and corrosion resistance by reducing the micro-galvanic heterogeneity associated with coarse grain-boundary precipitates. In WE43, T6 treatment has been shown to synergistically improve strength, corrosion resistance, and SCC resistance simultaneously. For dilute Mg–Zn–Ca alloys, both solution treatment and ageing alter grain size, intermetallic distribution, and the corrosion morphology in ways that are highly sensitive to the specific temperature–time window applied.

=== Thermo-mechanical processing ===
Extrusion, rolling, and forging refine grain structure through dynamic recrystallisation and dislocation accumulation, substantially improving mechanical properties beyond those achievable through casting and heat treatment alone. Combined thermo-mechanical processing routes applied to Mg–0.45Zn–0.45Ca resulted in modified microstructural features and corrosion characteristics compared with heat-treated-only material, demonstrating the strong coupling between deformation history and in-vitro degradation behaviour in dilute alloys.

=== Severe plastic deformation ===
Techniques including equal-channel angular pressing (ECAP), high-pressure torsion (HPT), and friction stir processing produce sub-micron or nanocrystalline grain structures that can significantly increase strength while potentially improving corrosion uniformity. HPT applied to Mg–0.2Zn–0.5Ca followed by heat treatment achieved hardness exceeding 110 HV and tensile strength above 300 MPa—values that approach those required for higher-load orthopaedic applications. Laser powder bed fusion (LPBF) additive manufacturing can produce grain structures of 1–3 μm, offering new possibilities for patient-specific implant geometries.

== Types of implant and clinical applications ==
=== Orthopaedic fracture fixation ===
Screws, pins, rods, staples, and plates fabricated from biodegradable magnesium alloys are used to stabilise bone fractures during healing. Indications already in clinical use include hallux valgus correction, small bone fractures of the hand, wrist, foot, and ankle, distal radius fractures, and osteochondral fragment fixation. Because the device resorbs after its mechanical function is complete, hardware removal surgery—common with permanent metallic fixation, particularly in children and anatomical sites prone to implant-related symptoms—is avoided.

=== Paediatric orthopaedics ===
The bioabsorbable nature of magnesium implants is particularly valuable in children, where permanent metallic hardware can interfere with skeletal growth and requires obligatory removal. Bioretec's RemeOs™ DrillPin has received FDA Breakthrough Device Designation for fixation of bone fragments in paediatric patients (≥2 years of age) with open growth plates, including transphyseal indications.

=== Spinal surgery ===
Bioretec's RemeOs™ Spinal Interbody Cage—an MRI-compatible hybrid composite device based on the company's proprietary magnesium alloy (US patent US11969519B1)—has received FDA Breakthrough Device Designation for intervertebral body fusion in the cervical spine. This represents the first resorbable metallic device to enter development for spinal fusion, a field previously dominated by permanent titanium cages and polymer-based resorbable alternatives.

=== Ligament and tendon reconstruction ===
Magnesium interference screws have been evaluated for anterior cruciate ligament (ACL) reconstruction, securing tendon grafts in bone tunnels while the graft integrates. A resorbable metallic screw avoids the concerns about long-term hardware impingement or tunnel widening associated with some polymer-based bioresorbable screws.

=== Cardiovascular resorbable scaffolds ===
Magnesium-based bioresorbable scaffolds (BRS) have been developed as alternatives to permanent coronary stents, providing temporary mechanical support while the vessel heals before fully degrading. Biotronik AG progressed through multiple device generations: the first absorbable metal stent (AMS-1) degraded within months; subsequent DREAMS 1G and DREAMS 2G (commercially Magmaris®, CE 2016) devices incorporated paclitaxel and sirolimus drug elution respectively to address restenosis. The third-generation DREAMS 3G device (commercially Freesolve™, CE 2024), now marketed by Teleflex following its acquisition of Biotronik's vascular intervention division (July 2025), uses a novel patented BIOmag® alloy and demonstrated a lesion failure rate of approximately 5% and near-zero scaffold thrombosis at five-year follow-up in the BIOMAG-I trial.

== Challenges ==
=== Corrosion rate control ===
The most significant engineering challenge is matching the degradation rate to the bone healing timeline. Unmodified magnesium corrodes too rapidly (2–4 mm/year in SBF) to reliably maintain mechanical integrity through the full healing period, typically 6–18 weeks for smaller fractures and longer for complex or spinal applications. Overly slow degradation delays tissue recovery and may increase the risk of late-stage implant-related complications. The target degradation profile is alloy- and geometry-specific, and achieving it consistently across patients with different physiological chemistries, ages, and health statuses is a central design challenge.

Corrosion in physiological media occurs through both general dissolution and localised attack at galvanic couples formed between the Mg matrix and cathodic intermetallic phases. The severity of localised corrosion depends strongly on the composition, size, distribution, and connectivity of second phases—which in turn are determined by alloy composition and processing history.

=== Stress corrosion cracking ===
Stress corrosion cracking (SCC) is a failure mode in which the combined action of sustained tensile stress and a corrosive environment initiates and propagates cracks at stress levels well below the material's yield strength. In body fluids, chloride ions destabilise the surface oxide film, promote pit formation, and—when tensile stress is simultaneously applied, as in load-bearing fixation—can cause a sudden, premature loss of mechanical integrity during the healing period.

Conventional SCC assessment has relied on slow strain rate testing (SSRT) or constant extension rate tensile (CERT) tests, which produce comparative susceptibility indices (strength retention I_{UTS}, ductility retention I_{ε}, and time-to-failure) on uniform-gauge specimens. These metrics are protocol-dependent and fail to yield a quantitative local stress threshold directly applicable to implant design. Strength-based indices tend to remain insensitive until late stages of damage, whereas elongation-based indices reflect early-stage localised cracking more sensitively.

A more design-relevant approach uses flat tapered tensile (FTT) specimens, in which a continuously varying cross-section generates a local stress gradient under a single applied load. After CERT testing in simulated body fluid (SBF), scanning electron microscopy maps the last observable SCC crack along the gauge length, and its position is converted into a local critical stress. Extrapolating stress thresholds measured at multiple strain rates to the quasi-static limit yields a strain-rate-independent SCC threshold σ₀. Applied to WE43 in SBF at 37 °C, this FTT–CERT methodology yielded σ₀ ≈ 178 MPa (95% confidence interval 168–188 MPa), validated by a 72-hour constant-load test at 90% of this value that produced no detectable cracking. The mixed transgranular and intergranular crack morphology observed in WE43 is consistent with hydrogen-assisted cracking and localised anodic dissolution along rare-earth intermetallic–matrix interfaces.

=== Hydrogen gas evolution ===
Corrosion of magnesium generates hydrogen gas as a stoichiometric byproduct (one mole of H₂ per mole of Mg dissolved). In vivo, this accumulates as peri-implant gas voids observable by radiograph or computed tomography, and occasionally as subcutaneous gas pockets. Rates of hydrogen generation are proportional to the overall corrosion rate. Advanced alloy compositions such as Mg–2Zn–1Mn have reduced gas evolution substantially compared with earlier alloys, and surface coatings further mitigate initial burst corrosion. In most published clinical series the gas accumulation has resolved without significant clinical consequence, but it remains a concern for large-footprint implants or fast-corroding surfaces.

=== Radiolucent zones ===
A characteristic radiological finding around degrading magnesium implants is the appearance of radiolucent zones—darker areas in the bone surrounding the implant—attributable to a combination of localised gas accumulation, resorption cavities, and bone remodelling. These zones are observed consistently in clinical follow-up but diminish with time and are typically no longer detectable by 12 months. Their clinical significance and relationship to long-term bone quality are subjects of ongoing investigation.

=== Rare-earth bioaccumulation ===
Emerging toxicokinetic evidence has raised concerns about the long-term accumulation of rare-earth elements in organs following the use of Mg–RE alloys. Elevated RE concentrations have been detected in rabbit organs years after implantation of LA- and WE-series alloys, and residual RE-containing corrosion products have been observed at implant sites well after complete device resorption. These findings have intensified interest in RE-free systems based on biologically essential elements (Mg, Zn, Ca, Mn, Sr) as safer long-term alternatives.

== Surface modification strategies ==
Surface engineering techniques slow and homogenise degradation, and in some cases add bioactive or antimicrobial functionality:

- Plasma electrolytic oxidation (PEO) / micro-arc oxidation (MAO) – High-voltage electrochemical processes that convert the surface into a thick, hard ceramic-like oxide layer, substantially improving corrosion resistance. PEO has been combined with polymer overlayers to create duplex coatings with up to five orders of magnitude improvement in corrosion resistance relative to bare alloy.
- Polymer coatings – Biodegradable polymer overlayers such as polylactic acid (PLA), PLGA, and polycaprolactone slow initial aggressive corrosion.
- Hydroxyapatite and calcium phosphate coatings – Encourage direct osseointegration and provide a degree of corrosion protection. Fluoride-substituted hydroxyapatite (FHA) coatings on Mg–Zn–Zr–Sr alloys show enhanced corrosion resistance and biomineralisation.
- Chemical conversion coatings – Fluoride, phytate, and rare-earth conversion treatments form compact protective films. Cerium-based/stearic acid composite coatings on AZ91D have demonstrated improved corrosion resistance in SBF.
- Mesoporous silica and bioactive glass coatings – Provide controlled ion release combined with corrosion protection and osteoinductive bioactivity.
- Bio-inspired and self-healing coatings – Active research aims to develop coatings that respond to pH changes at the corroding surface to release protective agents on demand.
- Physical vapour deposition (PVD) – Binary alloy coatings (e.g., Mg–Ti, Mg–Zr) deposited by PVD can increase corrosion resistance of underlying substrates.

== Commercial landscape ==
The following table summarises the principal commercially available and regulatory-approved or breakthrough-designated biodegradable magnesium implant products as of mid-2026.

Product	Alloy system	Form / indication	Regulatory status	Manufacturer / country
MAGNEZIX® CS (2.0, 2.7, 3.2, 4.8)	MgYREZr (WE43-related)	Compression screws – hallux valgus, hand, foot, ankle fractures	CE 2013	Syntellix AG, Germany
MAGNEZIX® pins	MgYREZr	Intramedullary pins	CE marked	Syntellix AG, Germany
K-MET®	Mg–5Ca–1Zn	Screws – distal radius fracture	KFDA 2015	K-MET Co., Ltd., Republic of Korea
HP-Mg screw	High-purity Mg (≥99.9%)	Bone internal fixation screw	CE 2020	Ian Technology, China
RemeOs™ Trauma Screw	Mg–Zn–Ca (proprietary, ZXM100-based)	Fracture fixation screw	FDA cleared 2023; CE 2025	Bioretec Oy, Finland
RemeOs™ DrillPin	Mg–Zn–Ca (proprietary)	Bone fragment fixation, paediatric and adult	FDA Breakthrough Designation 2025	Bioretec Oy, Finland
RemeOs™ Spinal Interbody Cage	Mg alloy/hybrid composite (US11969519B1)	Cervical spine intervertebral fusion	FDA Breakthrough Designation 2024	Bioretec Oy, Finland
Magmaris® (DREAMS 2G)	WE43-based	Coronary bioresorbable scaffold	CE 2016	Biotronik AG (now Teleflex), Germany/USA
Freesolve™ RMS (DREAMS 3G)	BIOmag® (proprietary Mg–Al)	Coronary bioresorbable scaffold	CE 2024	Biotronik AG (now Teleflex), Germany/USA

Leading companies in the competitive landscape include Syntellix AG, Biotronik/Teleflex, Bioretec Oy, Dongguan Eontec (China), SINOMED (China), ZHUOMED (China), and Magnesium Development Company (MDC, USA).

=== Bioretec oy ===
Bioretec Oy (Tampere, Finland; founded 2003; traded on Nasdaq First North Finland as BRETEC) is a Finnish medical device company specialising in biodegradable orthopaedic implants. The company has received Business Finland R&D grants for development of coatings for the next-generation RemeOs™ magnesium alloy platform, including participation in the IMD1 Co-Innovation consortium focused on the biological interface of active implants. The RemeOs™ magnesium alloy composition was granted a US patent in March 2024. The company's products are distributed in approximately 40 countries. Bioretec also markets the Activa® line of fully bioabsorbable implants made from self-reinforced PLGA, positioned at the polymer end of the resorbable spectrum alongside the metallic RemeOs™ line.

== Regulatory and standardisation considerations ==
Regulatory approval of biodegradable metallic implants presents specific challenges compared with permanent metallic devices or well-established polymer bioresorbables. Regulatory bodies require evidence of: controlled degradation kinetics matching the healing timeline; absence of harmful local or systemic accumulation of degradation products; maintenance of mechanical integrity for the intended functional period; and, for novel alloy compositions, demonstration of biocompatibility across the full degradation pathway including byproducts.

The absence of standardised in-vitro test protocols—for determining quantitative SCC thresholds applicable to design calculations, for simulating in-vivo degradation from benchtop experiments, or for long-term implant performance prediction—has been identified as a significant barrier to regulatory submission and market authorisation of new products. The FDA's Breakthrough Device Designation programme has been used by multiple companies (Bioretec, Magnesium Development Company) as a pathway for prioritised review of innovative designs addressing unmet clinical needs.

== See also ==
- Bone fracture
- Stress corrosion cracking
- Biodegradable metal
- Orthopaedic implant
- Bioresorbable scaffold
- Magnesium alloy
- Corrosion
- Stress shielding
- Fracture fixation
