= Magnesium battery =

Primary or secondary battery

Magnesium batteries are batteries that utilize magnesium cations as charge carriers and possibly in the anode in electrochemical cells. Both non-rechargeable primary cell and rechargeable secondary cell chemistries have been investigated. Magnesium primary cell batteries have been commercialised and have found use as reserve and general use batteries.

Magnesium secondary cell batteries are an active research topic as a possible replacement or improvement over lithium-ion–based battery chemistries in certain applications. A significant advantage of magnesium cells is their use of a solid magnesium anode, offering energy density higher than lithium batteries. Insertion-type anodes ('magnesium ion') have been researched.

== Primary cells ==
Primary magnesium cells have been developed since the early 20th century. In the anode, they take advantage of the low stability and high energy of magnesium metal, whose bonding is weaker by more than 250 kJ/mol compared to iron and most other transition metals, which bond strongly via their partially filled d-orbitals. A number of chemistries for reserve battery types have been studied, with cathode materials including silver chloride, copper(I) chloride, palladium(II) chloride, copper(I) iodide, copper(I) thiocyanate, manganese dioxide and air (oxygen). For example, a water-activated silver chloride/magnesium reserve battery became commercially available by 1943.

The magnesium dry battery type BA-4386 was fully commercialised, with costs per unit approaching that of zinc batteries. Compared to equivalent zinc-carbon cells they had greater capacity by volume, and longer shelf life. The BA-4386 was widely used by the US military from 1968 until ca.1984, when it was replaced by a lithium thionyl chloride battery.

A magnesium–air battery has a theoretical operating voltage of 3.1 V and energy density of 6.8 kWh/kg. General Electric produced a magnesium–air battery operating in neutral NaCl solution as early as the 1960s. The magnesium–air battery is a primary cell, but has the potential to be 'refuelable' by replacement of the anode and electrolyte. Some primary magnesium batteries find use as land-based backup systems as well as undersea power sources, using seawater as the electrolyte. The Mark 44 torpedo uses a water-activated magnesium battery.

== Secondary cells ==
=== Overview ===
Secondary magnesium ion batteries involve the reversible flux of Mg^{2+} ions. They are a candidate for improvement on lithium-ion battery technologies in certain applications. Magnesium has a theoretical energy density per unit mass under half that of lithium (18.8 MJ/kg (~2205 mAh/g) vs. 42.3 MJ/kg), but a volumetric energy density around 50% higher (32.731 GJ/m^{3} (3833 mAh/mL) vs. 22.569 GJ/m^{3} (2046 mAh/mL). Magnesium anodes do not exhibit dendrite formation, albeit only in certain nonaqueous solvents and at current densities below ca. 1 mA/cm^{2}. This allows magnesium metal to be used without an intercalation compound at the anode, (Note: The requirement to intercalate the 'metallic' lithium greatly reduces the energy density of a lithium-ion battery compared to a metallic lithium battery i.e. 372 mAh/g vs. 3862 mAh/g (or 837 mAh/cm3 vs. 2061 mAh/cm3) for lithium/graphite (as LiC_{6}) vs. Li metal.) thus raising the theoretical maximum relative volumetric energy density to around 5 times that of a graphite electrode. Modeling and cell analysis indicate that magnesium-based batteries may have a cost advantage due to magnesium's relative abundance and ease of mining.

Applications had been recognised by the 1990s based on V_{2}O_{5}, TiS_{2}, or Ti_{2}S_{4} cathode materials and magnesium anodes. However, instabilities in the discharge state and uncertainties on the role of water in the electrolyte limited progress. In 2000, Israeli researchers reported dendrite-free Mg plating in AlCl_{3}-ether electrolytes with a fairy high (>2 V vs. Mg/Mg^{2+}) anodic voltage stability limit. In that work, however, a low voltage (and somewhat expensive) anode material (chevrel-type Mo_{6}S_{8}) was used for Mg^{2+} intercalation. Despite research following that discovery, all attempts to develop a high-voltage Mg^{2+} intercalation anode for chloroaluminate (and related) electrolytes failed. Electrochemical Mg^{2+} intercalation into many solid materials is well known, for example from aqueous electrolytes. The problem is to find anode materials that show intercalation from the same solutions, which display reversible Mg metal plating.

In contrast to the Mg-metal batteries, Mg-ion batteries do not use a Mg-metal anode, but rather a solid material capable of intercalating Mg^{2+} ions. Such batteries usually use an aqueous or other polar electrolyte. A commercially viable/competitive market niche for Mg-ion batteries has not been identified.

=== Research ===
==== Anodes and electrolytes ====
A key drawback to magnesium anodes is the tendency to form a passivating (non-conducting) surface layer when recharging. The passivating layer was thought to originate from electrolyte decomposition during ion reduction. Common counter ions such as perchlorate and tetrafluoroborate were found to contribute to passivation, as were some common polar aprotic solvents such as carbonates and nitriles. The passivating layer motivates the use of magnesium intermetallics as anode materials, as their lower reactivity with common electrolytes makes them less prone to passivation. This is particularly true for the intermetallic compound Mg_{3}Bi_{2}, which constitutes a type of magnesium insertion electrode, based on reversible insertion of magnesium metal into a host compound. In addition to bismuth, tin and antimony have been used in compound insertion electrodes. These prevent anode surface passivation, but suffer from anode destruction due to volumetric changes, as well as slow insertion kinetics. Examples of insertion anode types include cycling between elemental Sn and Mg_{2}Sn.

Grignard-based ethereal electrolytes have been shown not to passivate. Magnesium organoborates showed electroplating without passivation. Mg(BPh_{2}Bu_{2})_{2} was used in the first rechargeable magnesium battery, but its usefulness was limited by electrochemical oxidation (i.e., a low anodic limit of the voltage window). Other electrolytes researched include borohydrides, phenolates, alkoxides, amido based complexes (e.g. based on hexamethyldisilazane), carborane salts, fluorinated alkoxyborates, a Mg(BH_{4})(NH_{2}) solid state electrolyte, and gel polymers containing Mg(AlCl_{2}EtBu)_{2} in tetraglyme/PVDF.

Interest in magnesium-metal batteries started in 2000, when an Israeli group reported reversible magnesium plating from mixed solutions of magnesium chloride and aluminium chloride in ethers, such as THF. This electrolyte's primary advantage is a significantly larger positive limit of the voltage window (higher voltage). Since then, other Mg salts, less corrosive than chloride, have been reported.

One drawback compared to lithium is magnesium's higher charge (+2) in solution, which tends to increase viscosity and reduce mobility. In solution a number of species may exist depending on counter ions/complexing agents – these often include singly-charged species (e.g. MgCl^{+} in the presence of chloride) – though dimers are often formed (e.g. Mg_{2}Cl_{3}^{+}). Movement into cathode host lattices is problematically slow.

In 2018 a chloride-free electrolyte together with a quinone-based polymer cathode demonstrated promising performance, with up to 243 Wh (870 kJ)kg^{−1} specific energy, up to 3.4 kW/kg specific power, and up to 87% retention at 2,500 cycles. The absence of chloride in the electrolyte was claimed to improve ion kinetics and reduce the amount of electrolyte needed, increasing performance.

One alternative approach is the combination of a Mg anode with a sulfur/carbon cathode. A non-nucleophilic electrolyte is needed that does not convert the sulfur into sulfide just by its reducing properties. Such electrolytes were developed on the basis of chlorine-containing and chlorine-free complex salts. The electrolyte is a Mg salt containing an Mg cation and two boron-hexafluoroisoproplylate groups as anions. This system is easy to synthesize, showing ionic conductivity similar to that of Li-ion cells, its electrochemical stability window is up to 4.5 V, it is stable in air and usable across solvents.

Another approach used a water electrolyte (eliminating risks of fire/explosion). The design used reusable materials, and coated parts of the battery with bismuth and bismuth-oxide to prevent dendrite formation, while still achieving energy density of 75 wH/kg.

Independently, a quasi-solid-state battery achieved 2.4 V and an energy density of 264 W·h kg⁻¹.

=== Cathode materials ===
Multiple cathode compounds have been researched. Materials investigated include zirconium disulfide, cobalt(II,III) oxide, tungsten diselenide, vanadium pentoxide and vanadate. Cobalt-based spinels showed inferior kinetics to magnesium insertion compared to their behaviour with lithium. In 2000 the chevrel phase form of Mo_{6}S_{8} showed suitability as a cathode, enduring 2000 cycles at 100% discharge with a 15% loss; drawbacks were poor low temperature performance (reduced Mg mobility, compensated by substituting selenium), as well as low voltage (ca. 1.2 V), and low energy density (110 mAh/g). A molybdenum disulfide cathode reached 1.8 V and 170 mAh/g. Transition metal sulfides are promising cathode candidates. A hybrid magnesium cell using a mixed magnesium/sodium electrolyte with sodium insertion into a nanocrystalline iron(II) disulfide cathode was reported in 2015.

Manganese dioxide cathodes showed good properties, but deteriorated on cycling. Spinels are electrochemically active in a Mg-ion configuration using a carbon-based adsorption anode. High-voltage Mg-ion materials, including MgMn_{2}O_{4}, MgV_{2}O_{4}, and MgCr_{2}O_{4} have been studied to understand diffusion pathways. Another framework structure type, termed ("post spinels", with the prototypical formula CaFe_{2}O_{4}) are studied.

In 2014 a rechargeable magnesium battery (conversion-type) was reported utilizing an ion-exchanged, olivine-type MgFeSiO_{4} cathode with a bis(trifluoromethylsulfonyl)imide/triglyme electrolyte – the cell showed a capacity of 300 mAh/g with a voltage of 2.4 V. MgMnSiO_{4} has been investigated as a potential Mg^{2+} insertion cathode.

Cathodic materials other than non-inorganic metal oxide/sulfide types have been investigated. in 2015 a cathode based on a polymer incorporating anthraquinone was reported; Other organic and organo-polymer cathode materials capable of undergoing redox reactions have been investigated, such as poly-2,2'-dithiodianiline. Quinone-based cathodes formed the cathode a high energy density magnesium battery reported by researchers in 2019.

In 2016 a porous carbon/iodine combination cathode was reported as a potential alternative to Mg^{2+} insertion cathodes - the chemistry was reported as potentially suitable for a rechargeable flow battery.

== See also ==
- List of battery types
- Magnesium-sulfur battery
