= Magnesium alloy =

Mixture of magnesium with other metals

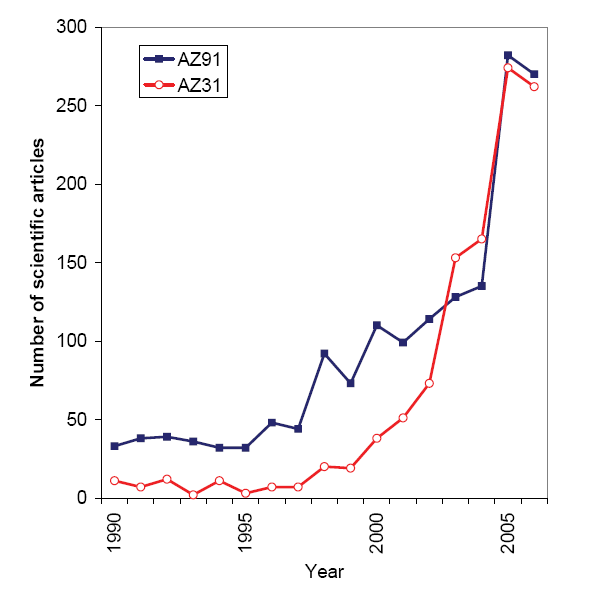
Figure 1: Number of scientific articles with terms AZ91 or AZ31 in the abstract.

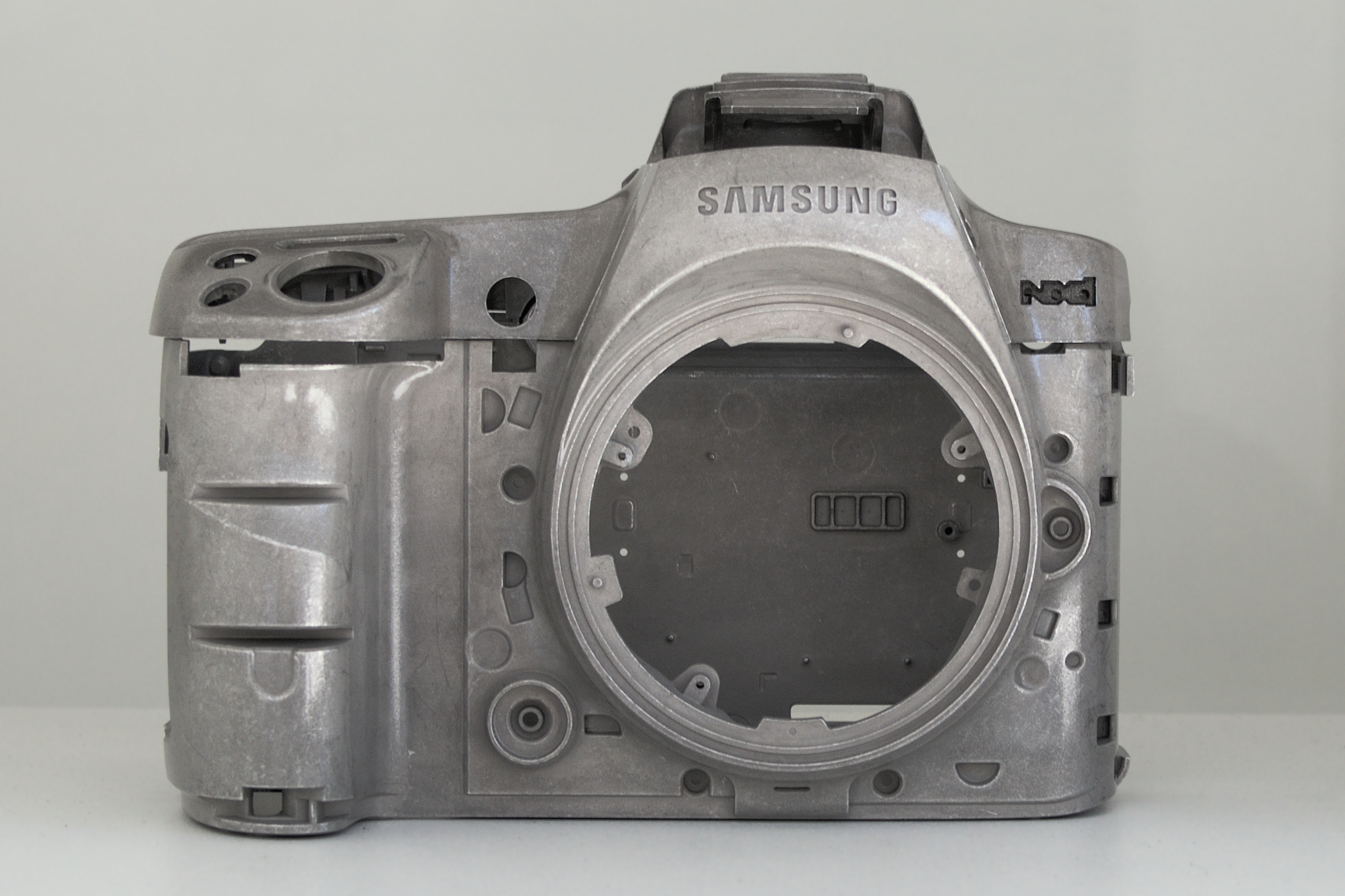
Camera chassis of a Samsung NX1, made of magnesium alloy

Magnesium alloys are mixtures of magnesium (the least dense structural metal) with other metals (called an alloy), often aluminium, zinc, manganese, silicon, copper, rare earths and zirconium. Magnesium alloys have a hexagonal lattice structure, which affects the fundamental properties of these alloys. Plastic deformation of the hexagonal lattice is more complicated than in cubic latticed metals like aluminium, copper and steel; therefore, magnesium alloys are typically used as cast alloys, but research of wrought alloys has been more extensive since 2003. Cast magnesium alloys are used for many components of modern cars and have been used in some high-performance vehicles; die-cast magnesium is also used for camera bodies and components in lenses.

The commercially dominant magnesium alloys contain aluminium (3 to 13 percent). Another important alloy contains Mg, Al, and Zn. Some are hardenable by heat treatment.

All the alloys may be used for more than one product form, but alloys AZ63 and AZ92 are most used for sand castings, AZ91 for die castings, and AZ92 generally employed for permanent mold castings (while AZ63 and A10 are sometimes also used in the latter application as well). For forgings, AZ61 is most used, and here alloy M1 is employed where low strength is required and AZ80 for highest strength. For extrusions, a wide range of shapes, bars, and tubes are made from M1 alloy where low strength suffices or where welding to M1 castings is planned. Alloys AZ31, AZ61 and AZ80 are employed for extrusions in the order named, where increase in strength justifies their increased relative costs.

Magnox, whose name is an abbreviation for "magnesium non-oxidizing", is 99% magnesium and 1% aluminium, and is used in the cladding of fuel rods in magnox nuclear power reactors.

Magnesium alloys are referred to by short codes (defined in ASTM B275) which denote approximate chemical compositions by weight. For example, AS41 has 4% aluminium and 1% silicon; AZ81 is 7.5% aluminium and 0.7% zinc. If aluminium is present, a manganese component is almost always also present at about 0.2% by weight which serves to improve grain structure; if aluminium and manganese are absent, zirconium is usually present at about 0.8% for this same purpose.

== Designation ==
| ASTM | B951 |
|---|---|
| A | Aluminium |
| C | Copper |
| E | Rare earths |
| H | Thorium |
| J | Strontium |
| K | Zirconium |
| L | Lithium |
| M | Manganese |
| N | Nickel |
| Q | Silver |
| S | Silicon |
| T | Tin |
| V | Gadolinium |
| W | Yttrium |
| Z | Zinc |

By ASTM specification B951-11(2018), magnesium alloys are represented by two letters followed by two, three, or four numbers and a serial letter. Letters tell main alloying elements as per the table at the right. Numbers indicate respective integer compositions of main alloying elements, from most to least abundant. The serial letter is chosen arbitrarily in order to disambiguate between two alloys with the same designation. Marking AZ91A for example conveys magnesium alloy with roughly 9 weight percent aluminium (between 8.6 and 9.4) and 1 weight percent zinc (between 0.6 and 1.4), and the final A means it was the first alloy with this composition at the time of registration. Exact composition should be confirmed from reference standards.

Aluminium, zinc, zirconium, and thorium promote precipitation hardening, manganese improves corrosion resistance, and tin improves castability. Aluminium is the most common alloying element. The numerals correspond to the rounded-off percentage of the two main alloy elements, proceeding alphabetically as compositions become standard. Temper nonstandard designation is usually much the same as in the case of aluminium: using –F, -O, -H1, -T4, -T5, and –T6.

Sand permanent-mold, and die casting are all well developed for magnesium alloys, die casting being the most popular. Although magnesium is about twice as expensive as aluminium, its hot-chamber die-casting process is easier, more economical, and 40% to 50% faster than cold-chamber process required for aluminium. Forming behavior is poor at room temperature, but most conventional processes can be performed when the material is heated to temperatures of 450–700 °F (232–371 °C). As these temperatures are easily attained and generally do not require a protective atmosphere, many formed and drawn magnesium products are manufactured.

The machinability of magnesium alloys is the best of any commercial metal, and in many applications, the savings in machining costs more than compensate for the increased cost of the material. Magnesium alloys can be spot-welded nearly as easily as aluminium, but scratch brushing or chemical cleaning is necessary before the weld is formed. Fusion welding is carried out most easily by processes using an inert shielding atmosphere of argon or helium gas.

Considerable misinformation exists regarding the fire hazard in processing magnesium alloys. It is true that magnesium alloys are highly combustible when in a finely divided form, such as powder or fine chips, and this hazard should never be ignored. Above 800 °F (427 °C), a non-combustible oxygen-free atmosphere is required to suppress burning. Casting operations often require additional precautions because of the reactivity of magnesium with sand and water in sheet, bar, extruded or cast form, however, magnesium alloys present no real fire hazard.

Thorium-containing alloys are not usually used, since a thorium content of more than 2% requires that a component be handled as a radioactive material, although thoriated magnesium known as Mag-Thor was used in military and aerospace applications in the 1950s. Similarly, uranium-containing alloys have declined in use to the point where the ASTM B275 "G" designation is no longer in the standard.

Magnesium alloys are used for both cast and forged components, with the aluminium-containing alloys usually used for casting and the zirconium-containing ones for forgings; the zirconium-based alloys can be used at higher temperatures and are popular in aerospace.

Magnesium+yttrium+rare-earth+zirconium alloys such as WE54 and WE43 (the latter with composition Mg 93.6%, Y 4%, Nd 2.25%, 0.15% Zr) can operate without creep at up to 300C and are reasonably corrosion-resistant.

Trade names have sometimes been associated with magnesium alloys. Examples are:

- Elektron
- Magnox
- Magnuminium
- Mag-Thor
- Metal 12
- Birmabright
- Magnalium

=== Cast alloys ===
Magnesium casting proof stress is typically 75–200 MPa (10.9–29.0 thousand psi), tensile strength 135–285 MPa (19.6–41.3 thousand psi) and elongation 2%–10%. Typical density is 1.8 g/cm^{3} and Young's modulus is 42 GPa (6.1 million psi). Most common cast alloys are:

- AZ63
- AZ81
- AZ91
- AM50
- AM60
- ZK51
- ZK61
- ZE41
- ZC63
- HK31
- HZ32
- QE22
- QH21
- WE54
- WE43
- Elektron 21

=== Wrought alloys ===
Magnesium wrought alloy proof stress is typically 160–240 MPa (23–35 thousand psi), tensile strength is 180–440 MPa (26–64 thousand psi) and elongation is 7%–40%. The most common wrought alloys are:

- AZ31
- AZ61
- AZ80
- Elektron 675
- ZK60
- M1A
- HK31
- HM21
- ZE41
- ZC71 ZM21 AM40 AM50 AM60 K1A M1 ZK10 ZK20 ZK30 ZK40

Wrought magnesium alloys have a special feature. Their compressive proof strength is smaller than tensile proof strength. After forming, wrought magnesium alloys have a stringy texture in the deformation direction, which increases the tensile proof strength. In compression, the proof strength is smaller because of crystal twinning, which happens more easily in compression than in tension in magnesium alloys because of the hexagonal lattice structure.

Extrusions of rapidly solidified powders reach tensile strengths of up to 740 MPa (107 thousand psi) due to their amorphous character, which is twice as strong as the strongest traditional magnesium alloys and comparable to the strongest aluminium alloys.

=== Compositions table ===
| Alloy name | Proportion (%) | | | | | Other metals | Notes |
| Alloy name | Mg | Al | Zn | Si | Mn | Other metals | Notes |
|---|---|---|---|---|---|---|---|
| AE44 | 92 | 4 | - | - | - | 4% mischmetal | Mischmetal an alloy of rare-earth elements with approximately 50% cerium and 25% lanthanum |
| AJ62A | 89.8–91.8 | 5.6–6.6 | 0.2 | 0.08 | 0.26–0.5 | 2.1–2.8% Sr, <0.1% each of Be, Cu, Fe, Ni | High temperature engine Mg alloy |
| WE43 | 93.6 | - | - | - | - | Y 4%, Nd 2.25%, 0.15% Zr | Used in aircraft and high performance vehicles, tensile strength 250 MPa |
| AZ81 | 91.07 | 8.11 | 0.64 | - | 0.18 | | - |
| AZ31B | 96 | 2.5–3.5 | 0.7–1.3 | <0.05 | 0.2 | ? | Wrought alloy, good strength and ductility corrosion resistance, weldability, extrusion |
| AMCa602 | 91.5 | 6 | 0.1 | - | 0.35 | 2% Ca | Non-combustible Mg alloy |
| AM60 | 93.5 | 6 | 0.1 | - | 0.35 | - | - |
| AZ91 | 90.8 | 8.25 | 0.63 | 0.035 | 0.22 | Cu – 0.003; Fe – 0.014; Be – 0.002 | Used for die castings |
| QE22 | - | - | - | - | - | 2.5% Ag, 2% RE, 0.6% Zr | |
| Magnox (Al 80) | 99.2 | 0.8 | - | - | - | - | Non-oxidizing Mg alloy |

== Characteristics ==
Magnesium's particular merits are similar to those of aluminium alloys: low specific gravity with satisfactory strength. Magnesium provides advantages over aluminium, having an even lower density (≈1.8 g/cm^{3}) than aluminium (≈2.8 g/cm^{3}). The mechanical properties of magnesium alloys tend to be below those of the strongest of the aluminium alloys.

The strength-to-weight ratio of the precipitation-hardened magnesium alloys is comparable with that of the strong alloys of aluminium or with the alloy steels. Magnesium alloys, however, have a lower density, stand greater column loading per unit weight and have a higher specific modulus. They are also used when great strength is not necessary, but where a thick, light form is desired, or when higher stiffness is needed. Examples are complicated castings, such as housings or cases for aircraft, and parts for rapidly rotating or reciprocating machines. Such applications can induce cyclic crystal twinning and detwinning that lowers yield strength under loading direction change.

The strength of magnesium alloys is reduced at elevated temperatures; temperatures as low as 93 °C (199 °F) produce considerable reduction in the yield strength. Improving the high-temperature properties of magnesium alloys is an active research area with promising results.

Magnesium alloys show strong anisotropy and poor formability at room temperature stemming from their hexagonal close-packed crystal structure, limiting practical processing modes. At room temperature, basal plane slip of dislocation and mechanical crystal twinning are the only operating deformation mechanisms; the presence of twinning additionally requires specific loading conditions to be favorable. For these reasons processing of magnesium alloys must be done at high temperatures to avoid brittle fracture.

The high-temperature properties of magnesium alloys are relevant for automotive and aerospace applications, where slowing creep plays an important role in material lifetime. Magnesium alloys generally have poor creep properties; this shortcoming is attributed to the solute additions rather than the magnesium matrix since pure magnesium shows similar creep life as pure aluminium, but magnesium alloys show decreased creep life compared to aluminium alloys. Creep in magnesium alloys occurs mainly by dislocation slip, activated cross slip, and grain boundary sliding. Addition of small amounts of zinc in Mg-RE alloys has been shown to increase creep life by 600% by stabilizing precipitates on both basal and prismatic planes through localized bond stiffening. These developments have allowed for magnesium alloys to be used in automotive and aerospace applications at relatively high temperatures. Microstructural changes at high temperatures are also influenced by Dynamic recrystallization in fine-grained magnesium alloys.

Individual contributions of gadolinium and yttrium to age hardening and high temperature strength of magnesium alloys containing both elements are investigated using alloys containing different Gd:Y mole ratios of 1∶0, 1∶1, 1∶3, and 0∶1 with a constant Y+Gd content of 2.75 mol%. All investigated alloys exhibit remarkable age hardening by precipitation of β phase with DO19 crystal structure and β phase with BCO crystal structure, even at aging temperatures higher than 200 °C (392 °F). Both precipitates are observed in peak-aged specimens. The precipitates contributing to age hardening are fine and their amount increases as Gd content increases, and this result in increased peak hardness, tensile strength and 0.2% proof stress but decreased elongation. On the other hand, higher Y content increases the elongation of the alloys but results in decreased strength.

Despite its reactivity (magnesium ignites at 630 °C (1,166 °F) and burns in air), magnesium and its alloys have good resistance to corrosion in air at STP. The rate of corrosion is slow compared with rusting of mild steel in the same atmosphere. Immersion in salt water is problematic, but a great improvement in resistance to salt-water corrosion has been achieved, especially for wrought materials, by reducing some impurities ― particularly nickel and copper — to very low proportions or using appropriate coatings.

== Fabrication ==
=== Hot and cold working ===
Magnesium alloys harden rapidly with any type of cold work, and therefore cannot be extensively cold formed without repeated annealing. Sharp bending, spinning, or drawing must be done at about 500 to 600 °F (260 to 316 °C), although gentle bending around large radii can be done cold. Slow forming gives better results than rapid shaping. Press forging is preferred to hammer forging, because the press allows greater time for metal flow. The plastic forging range is 500 to 800 °F (260 to 427 °C). Metal worked outside this range is easily broken due to lack of available deformation mechanisms.

=== Casting ===
Magnesium alloys, especially precipitation-hardened alloys, are used in casting. Sand, permanent mold and die casting methods are used, but plaster-of-Paris casting has not yet been perfected. Sand casting in green-sand molds requires a special technique, because the magnesium reacts with moisture in the sand, forming magnesium oxide and liberating hydrogen. The oxide forms blackened areas called burns on the surface of the casting, and the liberated hydrogen may cause porosity. Inhibitors such as sulfur, boric acid, ethylene glycol, or ammonium fluoride are mixed with the damp sand to prevent the reaction. All gravity-fed molds require an extra high column of molten metal to make the pressure great enough to force gas bubbles out of the casting and make the metal take the detail of the mold. The thickness of the casting wall should be at least 5/32 in (4.0 mm) under most conditions. Extra-large fillets must be provided at all re-entrant corners, since stress concentration in magnesium castings are particularly dangerous. Permanent mold castings are made from the same alloys and have about the same physical properties as sand castings. Since the solidification shrinkage of magnesium is about the same as that of aluminium, aluminium molds can often be adapted to make magnesium-alloy castings (although it may be necessary to change the gating). Pressure cold-chamber castings are used for quantity production of small parts. The rapid solidification caused by contact of the fluid metal with the cold die produces a casting of dense structure with excellent physical properties. The finish and dimensional accuracy are very good, and machining is necessary only where extreme accuracy is required. Usually these castings are not heat treated.

=== Welding, soldering, and riveting ===
Many standard magnesium alloys are easily welded by gas or resistance-welding equipment, but cannot be cut with an oxygen torch. Magnesium alloys are not welded to other metals, because brittle inter-metallic compounds may form, or because the combination of metals may promote corrosion. Where two or more parts are welded together, their compositions must be the same. Soldering of magnesium alloys is feasible only for plugging surface defects in parts. The solders are even more corrosive than with aluminium, and the parts should never be required to withstand stress. Riveted joints in magnesium alloy structures usually employ aluminium or aluminium-magnesium alloy rivets. Magnesium rivets are not often used because they must be driven when hot. The rivet holes should be drilled, especially in heavy sheet and extruded sections, since punching tends to give a rough edge to the hole and to cause stress concentrations.

=== Machining ===
A particular attraction of magnesium alloys lies in their extraordinarily good machining properties, in which respect they are superior even to screwing brass. The power required in cutting them is small, and extremely high speeds (5,000 ft/min (1,500 m/min) in some cases) may be used. The best cutting tools have special shapes, but the tools for machining other metals can be used, although somewhat lower efficiency results. When magnesium is cut at high speed, the tools should be sharp and should be cutting at all times. Dull, dragging tools operating at high speed may generate enough heat to ignite fine chips. Since chips and dust from grinding can therefore be a fire hazard, grinding should be done with a coolant, or with a device to concentrate the dust under water. The magnesium grinder should not be used also for ferrous metals, since a spark might ignite the accumulated dust. If a magnesium fire should start, it can be smothered with cast-iron turnings or dry sand, or with other materials prepared especially for the purpose. Water or liquid extinguishers should never be used, because they tend to scatter the fire. Actually, it is much more difficult to ignite magnesium chips and dust than is usually supposed, and for that reason they do not present great machining difficulties. The special techniques that must be used in fabricating magnesium (working, casting, and joining) add considerably to the manufacturing cost. In selecting between aluminium and magnesium or a given part, the base cost of the metal may not give much advantage to either, but usually the manufacturing operations make magnesium more affordable. There is, perhaps, no group of alloys where extrusion is more important than it is to these, since the comparatively coarse-grained structure of the cast material makes most of them too susceptible to cracking to work by other means until sufficient deformation has been imparted to refine the grain. Therefore, except for one or two soft alloys, machining is invariably a preliminary step before other shaping processes.

=== Hot extrusion ===
Not much pure magnesium is extruded, for it has somewhat poor properties, especially as regards its proof stress. The alloying elements of chief concern at present are aluminium, zinc, cerium and zirconium; manganese is usually also present since, though it has little effect on the strength, it has a valuable function in improving corrosion resistance. One important binary alloy, containing up to 2.0% manganese, is used extensively for the manufacture of rolled sheet. It is comparatively soft and easier to extrude than other alloys, and is also one of the few that can be rolled directly without pre-extrusion. In the UK, extrusions are made from billets of 2.87–12 inches (73–305 mm) dia. On presses varying in power over the range 600–3,500 short tons (540–3,180 t); normal maximum pressures on the billet are 30–50 short ton/in^{2} (4.2–7.0 t/cm^{2}) the U.S. the Dow chemical company have recently installed a 13,200 short tons (12,000 t) ton press capable of handling billets up to 32 in (0.81 m). Extrusion technique is generally similar to that for aluminium base alloys but, according to Wilkinson and Fox, die design requires special consideration and, in their opinion, should incorporate short bearing lengths and sharp die entries. Tube extrusion in alloys AM503, ZW2, and ZW3 is now made with bridge dies. (The aluminium-bearing alloys do not weld satisfactorily.) In contrast to the previous practice of using bored billets, mandrel piercing is now used in the extrusion of large diameter tubes in ZW3 alloy.

The stiffness of the alloys towards extrusion is increased in proportion to the amount of hardening elements they contain, and the temperature employed is generally higher the greater the quantity of these. Billet temperatures are also affected by the size of the sections, being higher for heavy reductions, but are usually in the range 250–450 °C (482–842 °F). Container temperatures should be identical with, or only slightly higher than billet temperature. Pre-heating of the billets must be carried out uniformly to promote as far as possible a homogeneous structure by absorption of compounds, such as Mg_{4}Al, present in the alloys.

Fox points out and this is also applicable to aluminium alloys. The initial structure of the billet is important, and casting methods that lead to fine grain are worthwhile. In coarse material, larger particles of the compounds are present that are less readily dissolved, and tend to cause a solution gradient. In magnesium alloys, this causes internal stress, since solution is accompanied by a small contraction, and it can also influence the evenness of response to later heat treatment.

The binary magnesium-manganese alloy (AM505) is readily extruded at low pressures in the temperature range 250 to 350 °C (482 to 662 °F)., the actual temperature used depending upon the reduction and billet length rather than the properties desired, which are relatively insensitive to extrusion conditions. Good surface condition of the extrusion is achieved only with high speeds, of the order of 15 to 30 metres (49 to 98 ft) per minute.

With the aluminium and zinc containing alloys, and particularly those with the higher aluminium contents such as AZM and AZ855 difficulties arise at high speeds due to hot-shortness. Under conditions approaching equilibrium magnesium is capable of dissolving about 12 per cent aluminium, but in cast billets 4%–5% usually represents the limit of solubility. Alloys containing 6% Al or more therefore contain Mg_{4}Al, which forms a eutectic melting at 435 °C (815 °F). The extrusion temperature may vary from 250 to 400 °C (482 to 752 °F), but at the higher values speeds are restricted to about 4 metres (13 ft) per minute. Continuous casting improves the homogeneity of these alloys and water cooling of the dies or taper heating of the billets further facilities their extrusion.

Introduction of the magnesium-zinc-zirconium alloys, ZW2 and ZW3, represents a considerable advance in magnesium alloy technology for a number of reasons. They are high strength, but, since they do not contain aluminium, the cast billet contains only small quantities of the second phase. Since the solidus temperature is raised by about 100 °C (180 °F), the risk of hotshortness at relatively high extrusion speeds is much reduced. However, the mechanical properties are sensitive to billet preheating time, temperature and extrusion speed, Long preheating times and high temperatures and speeds produces properties similar to those in older aluminium-containing alloys, Heating times must be short and temperatures and speeds low to produce high properties. Increasing zinc content to 5 or 6 wt.%, as in the American alloy ZK60 and ZK61, reduces sensitivity to extrusion speed in respect of mechanical properties.

Alloying of zirconium-bearing materials has been a major problem in their development. It is usual to add the zirconium from a salt—and careful control can produce good results. Dominion Magnesium Limited in Canada have developed a method adding in the conventional manner through a master alloy.

Explanation for the low extrusion rates necessary to successfully extrude some magnesium alloys does not lie outside reasons put forward for other metals. Altwicker considers that the most significant cause is connected. With the degree of recovery from crystal deformation, which is less complete when work is applied quickly, causing higher stresses and the exhausting of the capacity for slip in the crystals. This is worthy of consideration, for the speed of re-crystallization varies from one metal to another, and according to temperature. It is also a fact that a metal worked in what is considered its working range can frequently be made to show marked work hardening if quenched immediately after deformation—showing that temporary loss of plasticity can easily accompany rapid working.

== Further alloy development ==
Scandium and gadolinium have been tried as alloying elements; an alloy with 1% manganese, 0.3% scandium and 5% gadolinium offers almost perfect creep resistance at 350 °C (662 °F). The physical composition of these multi-component alloys is complicated, with plates of intermetallic compounds such as Mn_{2}Sc forming. Addition of zinc to Mg-RE alloys has been shown to greatly increase creep life by stabilizing RE precipitates. Erbium has also been considered as an additive.

=== Magnesium–lithium alloys ===
Adding 10% of lithium to magnesium produces an alloy that can be used as an improved anode in batteries with a manganese-dioxide cathode. Magnesium-lithium alloys are generally soft and ductile, and the density of 1.4 g/cm^{3} is appealing for space applications.

=== Non-combustible magnesium alloys ===
Adding 2% of calcium by weight to magnesium alloy AM60 results in the non-combustible magnesium alloy AMCa602. The higher oxidation reactivity of calcium causes a coat of calcium oxide to form before magnesium ignites. The ignition temperature of the alloy is elevated by 200 to 300 Kelvin (200 to 300°C, 360 to 540°F or °R). An oxygen-free atmosphere is not necessary for machining operations.

== Magnesium alloys for biomedical application ==
Among all biocompatible metals, Mg has the closest elastic modulus to that of natural bone. Mg ranks as the fourth most plentiful cation in the human body, is an essential element for metabolism, and is primarily stored in bone tissue. Stimulating the growth of bone cells and speeding up the recovery of bone tissue is accelerated with a diet containing Mg. The addition of biocompatible alloying elements can have a serious impact on the mechanical behavior of Mg. Creating a solid solution, which is a type of alloying, is an effective method to increase the strength of metals.
