= Erwin Payr =

Austrian-German surgeon

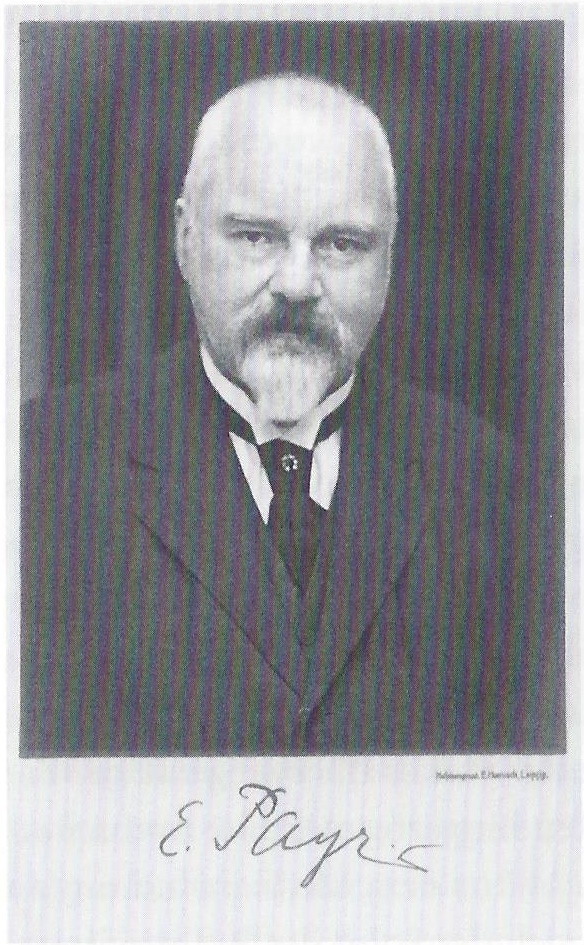
Erwin Payr

Erwin Payr (17 February 1871 – 6 April 1946) was an Austrian-German surgeon born in Innsbruck.

Following graduation in 1894 at Innsbruck, he worked as an assistant at the first pathological anatomy institute in Vienna. Afterwards he became an assistant to Carl Nicoladoni (1847-1902) at the University of Graz, where in 1899 he became habilitated for surgery.

In 1907 he became chief surgeon at the University of Greifswald, and in 1910 was appointed professor of surgery at the University of Königsberg. The following year he relocated to Leipzig, where he remained until his retirement in 1937.

Payr was regarded as an excellent physician known for his expertise in all facets of surgery. He was the first surgeon to use ozone treatments in order to control and kill bacteria, a practice he learned from Swiss therapist E.A. Fisch. In 1935 he published Über Ozonbehandlung in der Chirurgie (Ozone Treatment in Surgery). Also he introduced the use of absorbable magnesium sutures in vascular and nerve surgery. He first reported animal experiments with readsorbable magnesium tubular device for vascular anastomosis elegantly realizing intima-to-intima facing, however just identifying in that first report its implicit mechanical limits. He used elderberry stems for capillary drainage of brain abscesses.

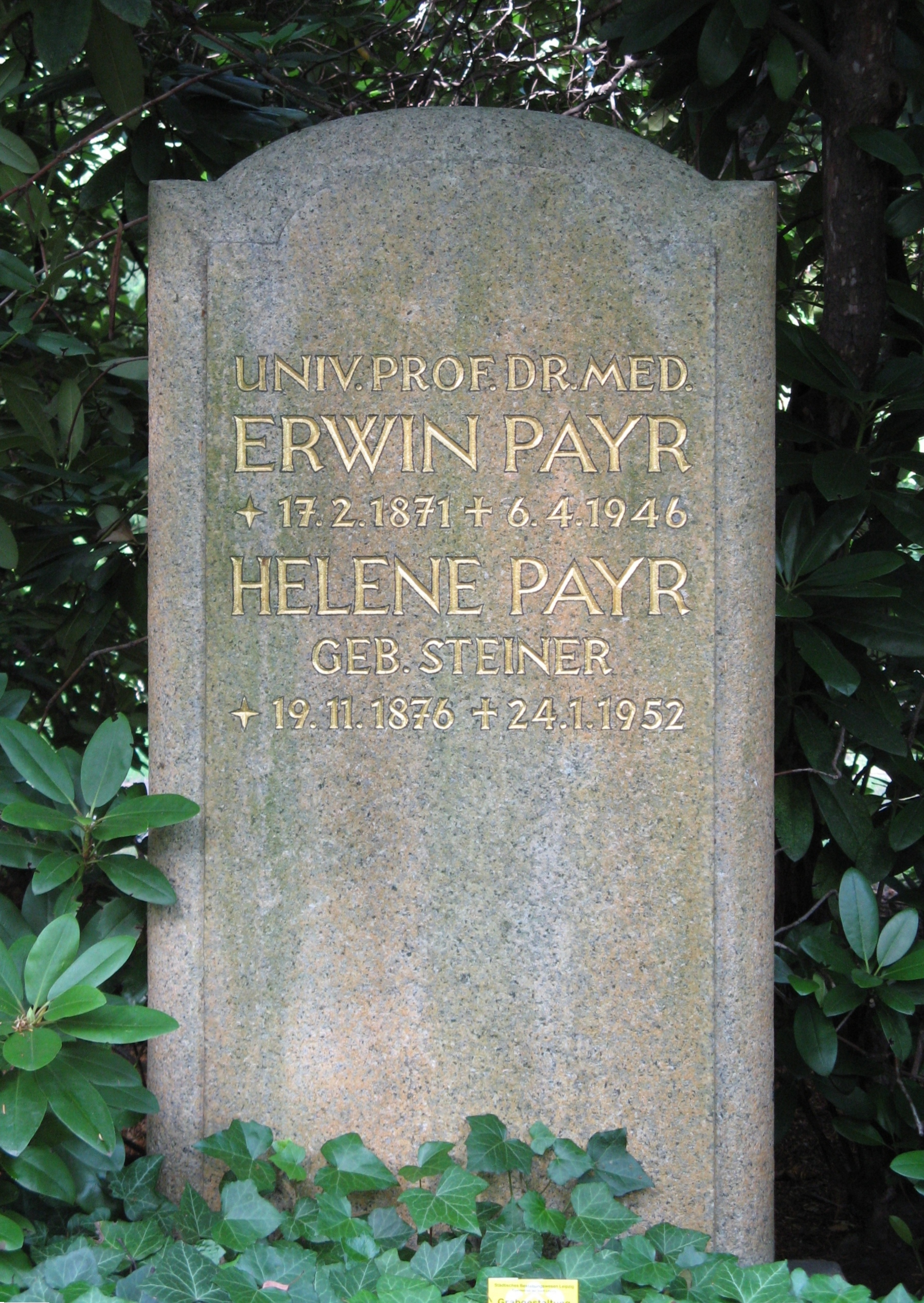
Gravestone of Erwin Payr and his wife Helene at Südfriedhof Leipzig

Splenic-flexure syndrome or "Payr's disease" is named after a condition he described. Payr's disease is constipation due to kinking of an adhesion between the transverse and descending colon. Also a tool used in abdominal surgery called a "Payr pylorus clamp" is named after him, as is "Payr's sign", an indication of thrombophlebitis in which pain occurs when pressure is applied to the sole of the foot.
