= Magnesium malate =

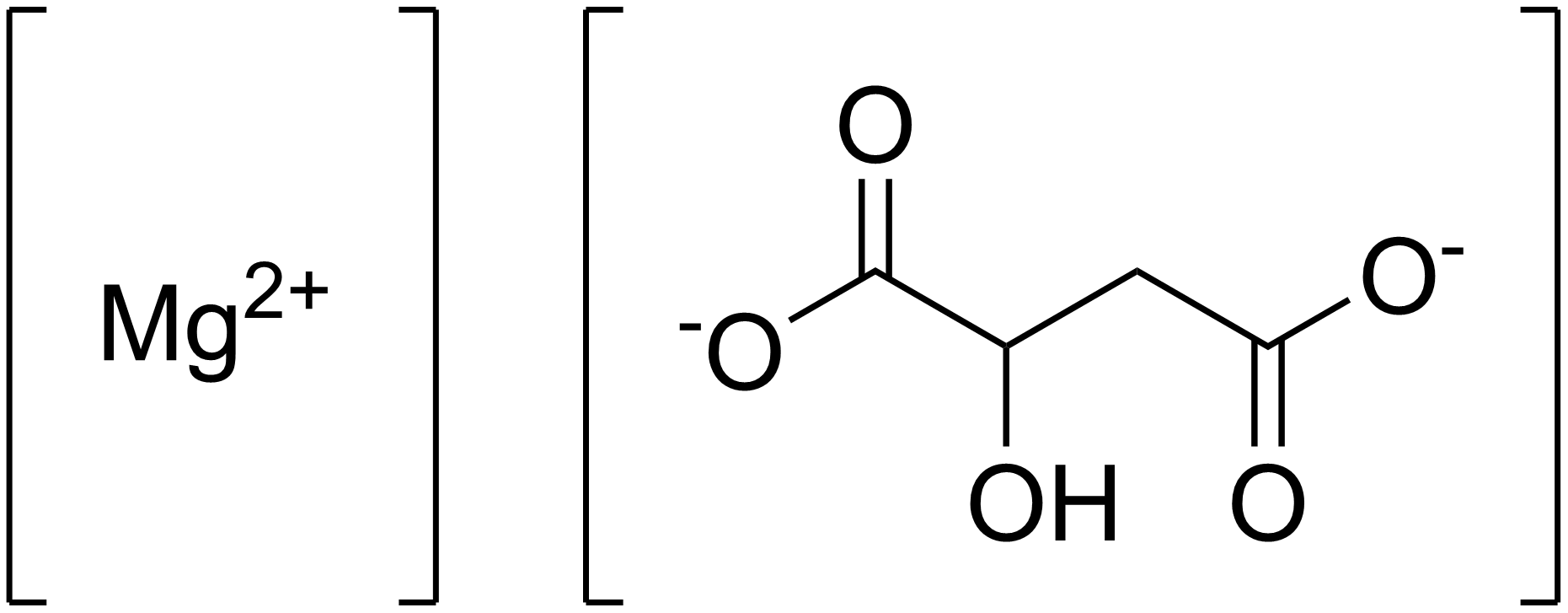

Names
- IUPAC name Magnesium 2-hydroxybutanedioate

Identifiers
CAS Number	869-06-7
3D model (JSmol)	Interactive image
ChemSpider	144425
ECHA InfoCard	100.011.623
EC Number	212-784-3
PubChem CID	164748
UNII	LA9X9UJA2Z
CompTox Dashboard (EPA)	DTXSID70893860
- InChI: InChI=1S/C4H6O5.Mg/c5-2(4(8)9)1-3(6)7;/h2,5H,1H2,(H,6,7)(H,8,9);/q;+2/p-2 Key: JFQQIWNDAXACSR-UHFFFAOYSA-L; InChI=1/C4H6O5.Mg/c5-2(4(8)9)1-3(6)7;/h2,5H,1H2,(H,6,7)(H,8,9);/q;+2/p-2 Key: JFQQIWNDAXACSR-NUQVWONBAZ
- SMILES: C(C(C(=O)[O-])O)C(=O)[O-].[Mg+2]

Properties
Chemical formula	C_{4}H_{4}MgO_{5}
Molar mass	156.376 g·mol^{−1}
- Except where otherwise noted, data are given for materials in their standard state (at 25 °C [77 °F], 100 kPa). verify (what is ?) Infobox references

Magnesium malate, the magnesium salt of malic acid, is a mineral supplement often used for nutritional concerns. It is represented by the chemical formula C4H4MgO5 and has a molecular weight of 156.376 g/mol. Magnesium malate is discussed as being a more bioavailable form of magnesium, along with other forms such as citrate and glycinate.
