= Mag-Thor =

Mag-Thor is the common name for a range of magnesium (Mg) alloys containing thorium (Th) that are used in aerospace engineering.

== Alloys ==
These alloys commonly contain manganese and zinc, but there are other combinations known. Some common alloys are named HK31, HM21, HM31, HZ32, ZH42, ZH62; where the "H" indicates that the alloy contains thorium. Magnesium alloy names are often given by two letters following by two numbers. The two letters indicate the main elements present in the alloy where A = aluminum, Z = zinc, M = manganese, S = silicon, etc. the numbers tell percentage compositions of the two elements. So, AZ31 would indicate that there is 3% aluminum and 1% zinc in the alloy.

Magnesium-thorium alloys have been used in several military applications, particularly in missile construction. The most noted example of this is the ramjet components in the CIM-10 Bomarc missile and Lockheed D-21 drone, which implemented thoriated magnesium in their engine construction. This is due to thoriated magnesium alloys being lightweight, having high strength, and creep resistance up to 350 °C. But, these alloys are no longer used due to radiation concerns involving thorium's radioactivity. This has resulted in several missiles being removed from public display. Similarly, the structure of the Equipment and Retro-Rocket Modules of the NASA's Gemini spacecraft (the white-painted portions) were made of thoriated magnesium for their strength-to-weight ratio and thermal properties. These were not part of the inhabited cabin, though the radiator tubing, whose silicone coolant flowed through the cabin, was also made of the same material. All examples burned up in the atmosphere upon reentry.

Another concern for the thoriated magnesium alloys is the low melting point and rapid oxidation of the metal, which presents a flash fire risk during production. Additionally, thorium-free magnesium alloys have been developed that exhibit similar characteristics to mag-thor, causing currently used magnesium-thorium alloys to be cycled out of use.
