= AJ alloys =

AJ alloys (AJ52 and AJ62) are die castable alloys of magnesium that have good creep resistance at high temperature. They contain manganese, aluminium, and strontium.

In the names the 'J' refers to Strontium.

Alloy   Mg     Al%  Sr%  Mn% 
AJ62  Balance  6    2    0.34   [2]
AJ52  Balance  5    2    0.4    [3]

AJ52 has higher creep resistance, and AJ62 has better castability. Both are used in the BMW magnesium–aluminium composite engine block.
