= Zirconium disulfide =

Zirconium(IV) sulfide
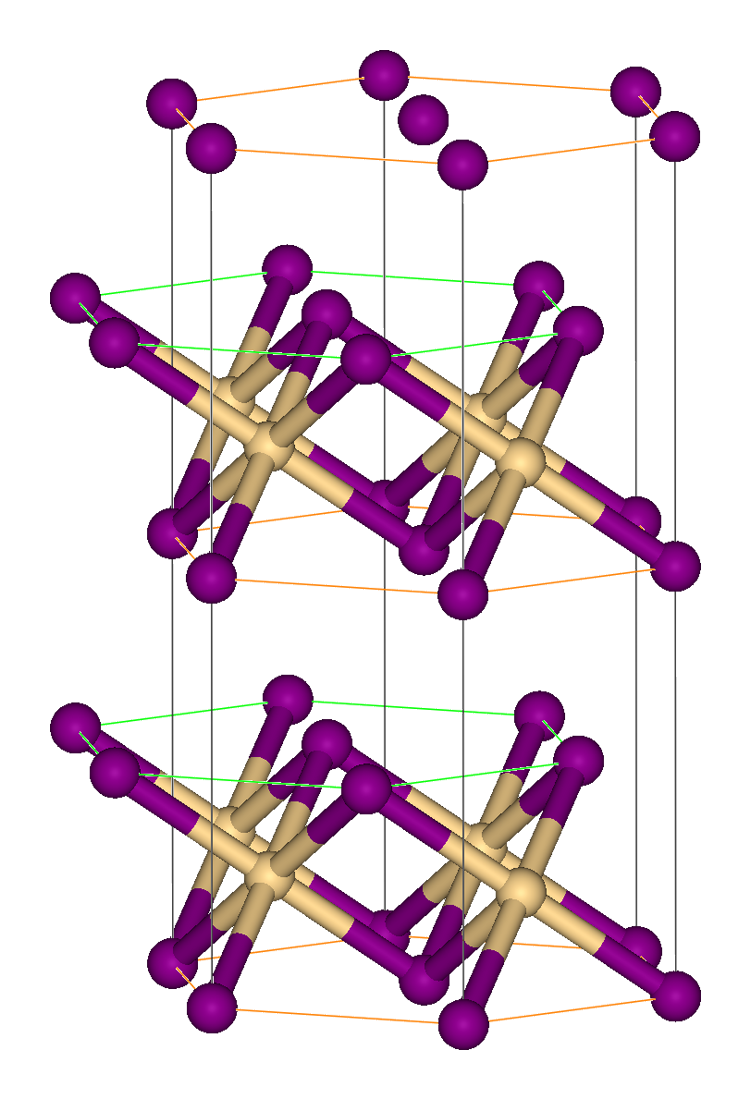

Names
- IUPAC name Zirconium(IV) sulfide

Identifiers
CAS Number	12039-15-5
3D model (JSmol)	Interactive image
ChemSpider	8395050
ECHA InfoCard	100.031.701
EC Number	234-885-1
PubChem CID	10219558
CompTox Dashboard (EPA)	DTXSID7065205
- InChI: InChI=1S/2S.Zr/q2*-2;+4 Key: XWPGCGMKBKONAU-UHFFFAOYSA-N
- SMILES: [S-2].[S-2].[Zr+4]

Properties
Chemical formula	ZrS_{2}
Molar mass	155.356 g/mol
Appearance	red-brown crystals
Density	3.82 g/cm^{3}
Melting point	1,480 °C (2,700 °F; 1,750 K)
Solubility in water	insoluble

Structure
Crystal structure	Rhombohedral, hP3
Space group	P-3m1, No. 164
Coordination geometry	octahedral

Hazards
Safety data sheet (SDS)	MSDS
- Except where otherwise noted, data are given for materials in their standard state (at 25 °C [77 °F], 100 kPa). verify (what is ?) Infobox references

Zirconium(IV) sulfide is the inorganic compound with the formula ZrS_{2}. It is a violet-brown solid. It adopts a layered structure similar to that of cadmium iodide.

Like the closely related titanium disulfide, ZrS_{2} is prepared by heating sulfur and zirconium metal. It can be purified by vapor transport using iodine.
