= Stress shielding =

Type of reduction in bone density

Stress shielding is the reduction in bone density (osteopenia) as a result of removal of typical stress from the bone by an implant (for instance, the femoral component of a hip prosthesis). This is because by Wolff's law, bone in a healthy person or animal remodels in response to the loads it is placed under.

When a distal implant is used, forces are transferred to the implant from the proximal parts of the bone, thus shielding the latter close to the joint, resulting in bone atrophy. A proximal implant reduces this effect by applying more stress to the proximal portion of the bone. However, this leads to high proximal peak loads. Ideally, stress is applied evenly over the whole implant. The elastic modulus of human bone (3–20 GPa) varies, but is closer to that of magnesium (41–45 GPa) than to those of titanium (110–127 GPa), stainless steel (189–205 GPa), iron (211.4 GPa), or zinc (78–121 GPa), so that magnesium implants can curtail stress-shielding phenomena; such implants are also bioresorbable. Porous implantation can also alleviate stress shielding.
