= Magnesium sulfur battery =

A magnesium–sulfur battery is a rechargeable battery that uses magnesium ions as its charge carrier. The anode is magnesium metal and cathode is a sulfur-carbon composite. The cathode composite material increases the conductivity of the cathode. The magnesium–sulfur battery is an emerging energy storage technology and is still in the stage of research. It has potential since, in theory, the Mg/S chemistry can provide 1722 Wh/kg energy density with a voltage at ~1.7 V.

Magnesium is abundant, non-toxic, and doesn't degrade in air. Most importantly, magnesium does not form dendrites during the deposition/stripping process, which is attributed to be the main cause for safety issues in lithium-ion batteries and rechargeable lithium batteries. A first review on Mg–S batteries has been published in MRS Communications.

== Research ==
=== Toyota ===
In 2011, Toyota announced a research project in this area, and in the same year they reported a new electrolyte that is chemically compatible with sulfur. The electrolyte was prepared as a Lewis acid-base complex from the Hauser base (HMDS)MgCl, where HMDS = hexamethyldisilazide, introduced by C. Liebenow et al. in 2000 and AlCl_{3}, conceptionally similar to Aurbach's binuclear electrolyte complex from 2001. Although the complex had to be refined by recrystallization and only THF could be used as solvent, a discharge voltage of 1 V was obtained over two cycles, demonstrating the principle feasibility.

Currently, efforts on rechargeable magnesium battery research are underway at Apple, Toyota, and Pellion Technologies, as well as in several universities.

=== Helmholtz-Institute Ulm and KIT ===
In 2013, researchers announced a new electrolyte and accompanying magnesium-based batteries. The electrolyte is more stable and works well with various solvents and at high concentrations. It supports sulfur cathodes. Two commercial chemicals, a magnesium amide and aluminum chloride were mixed in a solvent, the product can then be used directly as an electrolyte.

In 2015, a Mg rechargeable battery was presented built with a graphene–sulfur nanocomposite cathode, a Mg–carbon composite anode and a non-nucleophilic Mg-based complex in tetraglyme solvent as the electrolyte. The graphene–sulfur nanocomposites were prepared with a combination of thermal and chemical precipitation. The Mg/S cell delivers 448 mA h g^{−1} and 236 mA h g^{−1} after 50 cycles. The graphene–sulfur composite cathode, with a high surface area, porous morphology and oxygen functional groups, along with a non-nucleophilic Mg electrolyte, gives improved performance.

Recently, a new class of sulfur-compatible and Cl-free electrolytes was introduced. It is based on a weakly coordinated Mg salt with big anions (fluorinated alkoxyborate) which can be prepared by a simple reaction and used in-situ.

=== University of Maryland ===
In 2015, a team at University of Maryland discovered that Li ion additive can enhance the reversibility of the electrochemical reaction in a Mg/S battery. The Mg/S cell delivers ~1000 mAh/g capacity for 30 cycles with two discharge plateau at 1.75 V and 1.0 V. The obtainable energy density of the cell at material level is 874 Wh/kg, about half of its theoretical value.

In 2017, the same team successfully increases the cycling stability of a Mg/S cell to 110 cycles, by suppressing the dissolution of polysulfide with a concentrated electrolyte, a major reason for the loss of active material and capacity fading in Mg/S batteries. They also demonstrate that the MgTFSI_{2}-MgCl_{2}-DME electrolyte is compatible with sulfur cathode. Unlike the complex electrolytes made through Lewis acid-base reaction or the electrolytes using Mg salts with big anions, this electrolyte can be simply made by blending dried MgTFSI2, MgCl_{2} with DME. This facile synthesis procedure enables this electrolyte to be a convenient platform for the community to further study the Mg/S chemistry.
