= Magnesium production by country =

Production of primary magnesium metal by country

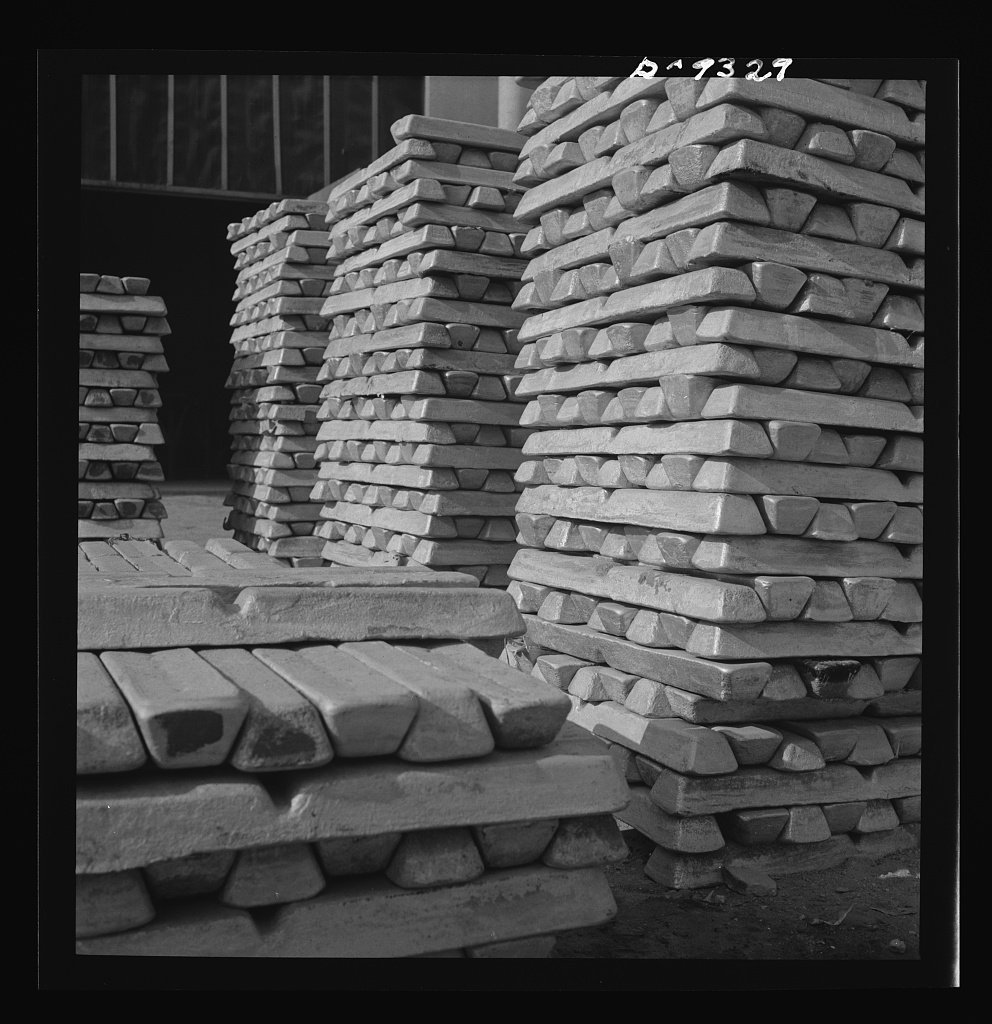
Magnesium ingots produced for war use in the United States, February 1943

Magnesium metal production

Primary magnesium metal production is concentrated in only a handful of countries, with China supplying nearly 90 per cent of world output as of 2026. Primary production covers magnesium metal smelted from ores and brines, by electrolysis of magnesium chloride or by silicothermic reduction of dolomite; it excludes secondary (recycled) magnesium and magnesium compounds such as magnesia.

Based on United States Geological Survey figures, in 2024 world primary production amounted to 1,080,000 tonnes, of which China produced 953,000 tonnes. The remaining production came chiefly from Russia, Israel, Brazil, Kazakhstan, Turkey and Iran. Germany originated industrial production in 1886 and dominated it until the Second World War. During the war, the United States built the world's largest magnesium industry and remained a leading producer for five decades. Today, China is the world's dominant producer owing to the low-cost Pidgeon process which forced a series of Western plant closures between 1998 and 2007. Magnesium is designated a critical mineral by the United States and a critical and strategic raw material by the European Union.

== Production by country ==
World primary magnesium production by country, 1990–2025, in thousand tonnes, from USGS data; the hatched segment is the British Geological Survey's estimate of United States output for 1999–2024, a period for which USGS withheld United States data (from 1999) and then reported zero production (from 2023).

Primary magnesium production and capacity (thousand tonnes), according to the United States Geological Survey and the British Geological Survey
Country	2024 production (USGS)	2024 production (BGS) (Note: BGS figures for China, Brazil, Turkey and the United States are BGS estimates while those for Russia and Israel are reported by those countries. BGS lists no other producing countries and publishes no world total for primary magnesium metal. BGS excludes magnesium consumed in titanium sponge production, which it puts at roughly 20,000 tonnes per year for Russia, whereas USGS figures for Russia include it from 2011.)	2025 production (USGS est.)	2025 capacity (USGS)
World (rounded)	1,080	n/a	1,100	1,800
China	953	950	950	1,480
Russia	59	15.1	60	81
Brazil	20	20	20	22
Israel	17	20	20	34
Kazakhstan	15	n/a	13	21
Turkey	15	4	15	15
Iran	5	n/a	5	6
United States	0	0.5	0	64 (Note: Capacity of the idle US Magnesium smelter at Rowley, Utah, which had not produced since 2022; USGS reported that "production capacity was idle throughout 2024 at the only U.S. primary magnesium smelter".)
Other countries	0	n/a	0	42

Primary magnesium production by country, selected years (thousand tonnes; dashes indicate no reported production)
Country	1990	1995	2000	2005	2010	2015	2020	2023
China	5.9	93.6	190	470	654	859	961	804
United States	139	142	W (Note: "W" – withheld by USGS to avoid disclosing company proprietary data; not included in world totals. USGS reported that United States primary production stopped in 2022 and recorded zero from 2023.)	W	W	W	W	0
Soviet Union (Note: Dissolved in December 1991; Russia, Ukraine and Kazakhstan appear separately from 1992.)	88.0	—	—	—	—	—	—	—
Russia	—	37.5	45.0	45.0	20.8	60.0 (Note: From the 2011 data year, USGS figures for Russia, Kazakhstan and Ukraine include magnesium consumed for titanium sponge production; earlier years exclude it, so values on either side of 2010–11 are not directly comparable.)	48.0	18.0
Canada	25.3	48.1	80.0	50.0	—	—	—	—
Norway	48.2	28.0	41.4	—	—	—	—	—
France	14.0	14.4	16.5	—	—	—	—	—
Israel	—	—	31.7	27.9	23.3	19.3	18.5	17.0
Kazakhstan	—	9.0	10.4	20.0	15.0	8.1	16.0	22.0
Ukraine	—	10.0	0 (Note: USGS published 3 tonnes per year for Ukraine for 2000–2004.)	2.0	7.0	7.7	6.0	0
Brazil	8.7	9.7	5.7	6.0	16.0	15.0	18.0	20.0
Turkey	—	—	—	—	—	0.2	12.0	13.0
Serbia (Note: Reported as Serbia and Montenegro until their union dissolved in June 2006.)	—	2.6	1.3	1.5	1.1	—	—	—
Yugoslavia (Note: Dissolved in April 1992.)	5.8	—	—	—	—	—	—	—
Japan	12.8	—	—	—	—	—	—	—
Italy	5.7	—	—	—	—	—	—	—
Iran	—	—	—	—	—	1.0	—	5.0
World total (Note: World totals are rounded by USGS to no more than three significant digits and exclude withheld United States production from 1999.)	354	395	422	622	737	970	1,080	900

== History ==
World and United States primary magnesium production, 1915–2025, in thousand tonnes, from USGS Data Series 140; the dashed line is the British Geological Survey's estimate of United States output for 1999–2024, a period for which USGS withheld United States data (from 1999) and then reported zero production (from 2023).

=== Origins in Germany (1886–1914) ===
Founded on 9 April 1885, the Aluminium- und Magnesiumfabrik at Hemelingen began worldwide industrial magnesium production in 1886 by electrolysis of molten carnallite in the Graetzel process. Between 1886 and 1890, its total output amounted to about 60 tonnes. A second electrolysis plant was built at Bitterfeld in 1896 by Chemische Fabrik Griesheim-Elektron, which had acquired the Graetzel process and in 1909 coined the "Elektron" brand name for magnesium alloys. Before the First World War, Germany was the only significant producer.

=== World wars and the interwar period (1915–1945) ===
The demand created by the First World War gave rise to new capacity in the United States. Dow Chemical poured its first magnesium ingot in 1916 in Midland, Michigan. During the war, the United States grew to seven producers, but the postwar collapse in demand left only Dow and American Magnesium Corporation (a subsidiary of Alcoa). After the latter's withdrawal in July 1927, Dow remained the sole American producer until 1941.

Formed in 1925, IG Farben took over German magnesium production at Bitterfeld in 1927, and pioneered the oxychloride process (1928) which substantially reduced power consumption. Germany expanded capacity through the 1930s for rearmament and by 1938 produced more magnesium than the rest of the world combined.

The industry underwent a deep transformation during the Second World War. In the United States, prewar production of 3,350 short tons (1939, all by Dow) rose to a wartime peak of 184,078 short tons (166,993 tonnes) in 1943, after the federal government spent about US$370 million through the Defense Plant Corporation on thirteen new plants operated by eleven companies. The largest plant was situated near Las Vegas and belonged to Basic Magnesium. In 1941 Dow opened a plant in Freeport, Texas which was unique in producing magnesium from seawater brines. This is possible because magnesium is the second most abundant metal ion in seawater.

The dominant wartime uses of magnesium were aircraft construction and incendiary bombs. By 1944 the Surplus Property Administration estimated United States capacity at 293,000 short tons per year against 35,000–55,000 for Germany, 30,000 for the United Kingdom and 15,000–16,500 for Japan. As the war ended, demand went with it, and most American plants were closed and disposed of. US output fell to about 5,000 tonnes in 1946.

=== Postwar era (1946–1990) ===
Postwar production was concentrated in the United States (Dow, at Freeport), the Soviet Union and Norway, where Norsk Hydro began production at Herøya, near Porsgrunn, in the early 1950s; Volkswagen, which used about 20 kg of magnesium in each Beetle, bought some 60 per cent of Hydro's output between 1951 and 1981. The Soviet magnesium industry, established in 1936, was built around electrolytic plants integrated with titanium sponge production, at Solikamsk, Zaporizhzhia in Ukraine and Ust-Kamenogorsk in Kazakhstan.

The industry experienced another boom-and-bust during the Korean War. Nonetheless, the demand for magnesium kept rising given its properties as a lightweight structural metal and alloy; in the 1970s magnesium became a standard alloying addition to aluminium beverage cans. Through the 1980s the United States supplied roughly 40 per cent of world production.

=== Globalisation and the rise of China (1990–2010) ===
In the 1990s the Western magnesium industry experienced three shocks. First, the dissolution of the Soviet Union brought exports from Russia, Ukraine and Kazakhstan into Western markets, depressing prices; the United States imposed antidumping duties on pure magnesium from Canada in 1992 and from China, Russia and Ukraine in 1995. Second, new capacity opened outside the traditional producers: in the early 1990s Norsk Hydro entered Canada with a plant in Bécancour, Quebec, and Dead Sea Magnesium built a plant in Israel in 1997. Third, Chinese production by the Pidgeon process grew from about 6,000 tonnes in 1990 to 93,600 tonnes in 1995 and 190,000 tonnes in 2000.

Chinese competition had profound consequences. Dow Chemical, once described as "the industry's dominant firm for most of the century" closed Freeport in November 1998, after eighty years in the business. Magnesium Corporation of America (MagCorp), operating the Great Salt Lake brine plant at Rowley, Utah, entered Chapter 11 in 2001; its assets were sold in 2002 to the newly formed US Magnesium LLC. Norsk Hydro announced in October 2001 the end of five decades of Norwegian production and its Porsgrunn plant closed in 2002. Pechiney closed Marignac, France's last plant, permanently in 2001. Noranda's new Magnola plant in Quebec, designed to make magnesium from asbestos tailings, started up in 2000–2001 and closed in April 2003. By 2002 China accounted for about half of world output. In 2007 Norsk Hydro closed Bécancour, then the world's largest magnesium plant. Timminco, Canada's remaining primary magnesium producer, ended production shortly afterwards.

=== Since 2010 ===
Chinese production roughly doubled again between 2009 and 2019, stabilizing at about 84–89 per cent of the reported world total. The vast majority of Chinese production is concentrated in Shaanxi province, where Pidgeon smelters are fuelled predominantly by waste gas from semi-coke plants. In September–October 2021, energy-consumption controls forced deep production cuts around Yulin, the region producing some 60 per cent of Chinese output. As a result, European prices rose about fivefold within weeks, and European industry associations warned that stocks would be exhausted within months. The same autumn, US Magnesium declared force majeure after equipment failures and USGS later reported that American primary production stopped in 2022, marking the first time since 1915 that the United States produced no primary magnesium. Ukrainian production at Zaporizhzhia ceased in 2023, after Russia's invasion of the country.

Western governments responded with onshoring programmes, critical-material designations and financial support for new projects, including a Defense Production Act award in 2024 to Magrathea Metals toward a seawater/brine-based magnesium plant. In March 2025 the European Commission selected Verde Magnesium's proposed mine and smelter at Budureasa, Romania as one of 47 strategic projects under the Critical Raw Materials Act. The company plans a pilot plant of about 500 tonnes per year from late 2026 and a 30,000-tonne-per-year smelter by 2030. Once operational, it will be the first primary magnesium produced in the EU since 2001.

== Producing countries ==
=== China ===
China is the world's dominant producer: 953,000 tonnes in 2024, about 88 per cent of the world total. Production is almost entirely by the silicothermic Pidgeon process from dolomite and carried out in numerous and relatively small plants; USGS counted 136 producing companies in 2004. Most production today takes place in Shaanxi province (around Yulin and Fugu), with production also in Shanxi and capacity additions in Xinjiang and Jilin. Magnesium production is energy-intensive, but Chinese producers keep costs low by colocating with semi-coke plants and fuelling the Pidgeon process with their waste gas. Because of this, Western producers, who usually employ electrolytic technologies, had largely become uncompetitive from the early 2000s.

The Pidgeon process is carbon-intensive, emitting some 20–25 tonnes of CO_{2} per tonne of magnesium, against about 5 tonnes of an electrolytic plant. In an attempt to reduce emissions of its magnesium industry, China piloted a large-scale electrolytic project at Qinghai Salt lake. However, as of 2024 the project faced major technical problems and awaits full commissioning.

=== Russia ===
Russian production comes from two Soviet-era electrolytic plants tied to titanium sponge production: the Solikamsk Magnesium Plant (SMZ) in Perm Krai, where Soviet magnesium production began in 1936, and the Avisma works of VSMPO-AVISMA. In 2022 a Russian court voided SMZ's privatization during 1992–93, and stripped its owners of 89.5 per cent of the company's shares. USGS noted SMZ held about 60 per cent of Russia's magnesium production capacity. USGS revised Russian output for 2024 sharply upward, to 59,000 tonnes, on the basis of a government report. United States antidumping duties have applied to Russian magnesium in various forms since 1995.

=== Israel ===
Dead Sea Magnesium Ltd., a joint venture of Israel Chemicals (about 65 per cent) and Volkswagen (35 per cent), began production at Sdom in 1997, electrolysing carnallite from Dead Sea brines. By 1999 it had reached a capacity of about 33,000 tonnes per year. Israel was the largest exporter of magnesium metal to the United States in 2021–24, accounting for 47 per cent of US imports.

=== Kazakhstan ===
The Ust-Kamenogorsk Titanium and Magnesium Plant (UKTMP) produces magnesium integrated with its titanium sponge operation. USGS estimates Kazakh production at 13,000–27,000 tonnes per year in the 2020s.

=== Brazil ===
Brazil has been a continuous small producer since at least 1990. In the 1990s USGS identified Brasmag as the country's sole producer; production today is by the Rima Group in Minas Gerais, using a charcoal-fired silicothermic process. Output has been about 15,000–22,000 tonnes per year since 2010.

=== Turkey ===
Turkey entered production in 2015 when ESAN Eczacıbaşı commissioned a 15,000-tonne-per-year smelter at Eskişehir; the plant was sold to Kar Mineral Madencilik in September 2022. Production reached about 15,000 tonnes by 2024.

=== Iran ===
USGS records small Iranian production (about 500–5,000 tonnes per year) in most years since 2014, at 5,000 tonnes per year in 2021–2025.

=== United States ===
The United States produced primary magnesium continuously from 1915 to 2022. Dow Chemical was the sole producer from 1927 to 1941 and the industry's central firm until it exited in 1998. During the Second World War, government procurement made the US the world's largest magnesium producer.

Alcoa's Northwest Alloys plant at Addy, Washington, closed in October 2001, leaving MagCorp at Rowley, Utah, as the sole US producer, recovering magnesium electrolytically from Great Salt Lake brines. In 2002 MagCorp became US Magnesium LLC. US Magnesium continued production until declaring force majeure in September 2021. Production fully stopped in 2022. The company eventually entered Chapter 11 in September 2025, and in January 2026 the State of Utah bought the Rowley plant for US$30 million, largely for its water rights.

In February 2024 the United States Department of Defense awarded $19.6 million under the Defense Production Act to Magrathea Metals to re-establish domestic production of magnesium.

== Former producing countries ==
=== Canada ===
Canada produced primary magnesium continuously from the Second World War until about 2008. In the late 1990s it was the world's second-largest producer. The silicothermic Pidgeon process was first industrialized there: L. M. Pidgeon's process began production around 1942 at the Dominion Magnesium (later Chromasco/Timminco) plant at Haley Station, Ontario. The plant operated for over six decades.

Norsk Hydro's electrolytic plant at Bécancour, Quebec, opened in early 1990 and exported chiefly to the United States, prompting the 1992 antidumping and countervailing duty orders. Facing additional competition from China, the plant closed in 2007.

The Magnola plant at Danville, Quebec (Noranda), produced magnesium from asbestos tailings from its start-up in 2000–2001 until April 2003. It was closed following a US$520 million writedown amid Chinese competition. An earlier plant at High River, Alberta (Magcan), closed in 1991. Canadian production peaked at 77,100 tonnes in 1998 and ended when Timminco ceased primary output around 2008.

Alliance Magnesium began pilot production of magnesium from asbestos-mine tailings at Val-des-Sources, Quebec, in 2017, and in 2022 was building a first commercial phase. Renamed Tergeo in April 2023, when commercial production was targeted for 2026, the company entered creditor protection in November 2023, and in January 2026 the municipality of Val-des-Sources acquired the site for redevelopment as an industrial park.

=== Norway ===
Norsk Hydro produced magnesium at Herøya (Porsgrunn) from the early 1950s, long anchored by Volkswagen demand. Described as the last primary magnesium production plant in Western Europe, the plant closed in 2002. Thereafter, Hydro concentrated production at Bécancour before exiting magnesium entirely in 2007.

=== Ukraine ===
Soviet-era production came from Kalush and the Zaporizhzhia Titanium-Magnesium Combine (ZTMC). Kalush closed in early 1999 with debts of US$226 million. ZTMC's output, largely consumed in titanium sponge production, continued at a few thousand tonnes per year until the 2022 Russian invasion of Ukraine; USGS records 2,000 tonnes that year and none since 2023.

=== France ===
Pechiney produced magnesium at Marignac (Haute-Garonne) as the last magnesium plant operating in the European Union. Production lasted until 2001, when the company closed it permanently.

=== Japan ===
Japan exited primary production in the mid-1990s: Furukawa Magnesium closed in 1989, Japan Metal & Chemicals in 1992, and Ube Industries closed its 8,500-tonne-per-year plant in September 1994, leaving no primary capacity. High production costs and the appreciation of the yen were cited as reasons for closure.

=== South Korea ===
POSCO built South Korea's first magnesium smelter at Gangneung, completed in 2012. USGS recorded production only for 2012–13, later revising 2014–16 output to zero.

=== Malaysia ===
CVM Minerals Ltd. operated a smelter in Perak, expanded to 15,000 tonnes per year in 2011 but beset by technical problems. USGS recorded only token production in 2011–13.

=== Serbia ===
A small producer (about 1,000–4,000 tonnes per year, reported as Serbia and Montenegro until 2006) appears in USGS tables, with production last recorded in 2010.

=== Italy ===
Italy produced magnesium until 1992.

=== Germany ===
The founding country of the industry (see History) was the world's largest producer before the Second World War, with IG Farben production at Bitterfeld, Aken and Staßfurt. According to USGS, Germany ceased to be a producer since 1990.

=== United Kingdom ===
Magnesium Elektron Ltd, founded in 1934, produced magnesium from 1936 at Clifton Junction near Manchester under licence from IG Farben. In 1944 British capacity was about 30,000 short tons. Its successor, Luxfer MEL Technologies, remains a magnesium-alloy specialist, but there is no primary production in the United Kingdom.

== Trade measures and critical-material designations ==
Antidumping and countervailing measures have shaped magnesium trade for over three decades. The United States imposed duties on pure magnesium from Canada in 1992 (the countervailing duty orders were revoked in 2006), on pure magnesium from China, Russia and Ukraine in May 1995, on granular magnesium from China in 2001, and on magnesium metal from China and Russia following investigations initiated in 2004. The order on Chinese pure magnesium was continued most recently in 2023. European producers initiated their own antidumping proceedings against Russian magnesium in the early 1990s.

Magnesium has appeared on every European Commission list of critical raw materials since the first list, published in 2011. Magnesium metal is among the strategic raw materials of the 2024 Critical Raw Materials Act. The United States included magnesium in its 2022 final list of critical minerals and the Department of Energy's 2023 critical materials list.

== See also ==
- Magnesium
- Pidgeon process
- Magnesium alloy
- Lists of countries by mineral production
