= Silicothermic reaction =

Silicothermy

Silicothermic reactions are thermic chemical reactions using silicon as the reducing agent at high temperature (800-1400°C).

They were initially commercialized for the production of low-carbon ferromanganese before and during World War I(F. M. Becket played a significant role) and are still used today. They were also historically used for the production of low-carbon ferrochrome, but were displaced by electric methods.

The most prominent example is the Pidgeon process (developed commercially in Canada during the Second World War by Lloyd Montgomery Pidgeon) for reducing magnesium metal from ores. Other processes include the Bolzano process and the magnetherm process. All three are commercially used for magnesium production.

== See also ==
- Aluminothermic reaction
- Calciothermic reaction
