= Aluminium molybdate =

Identifiers
CAS Number	15123-80-5 =
3D model (JSmol)	Interactive image
ChemSpider	10732777
ECHA InfoCard	100.035.607
PubChem CID	21977438
CompTox Dashboard (EPA)	DTXSID10893980
- InChI: InChI=1S/2Al.3Mo.12O/q2*+3;;;;;;;;;;6*-1 Key: NKSYNYABFPVRNP-UHFFFAOYSA-N; InChI=1/2Al.3Mo.12O/q2*+3;;;;;;;;;;6*-1 Key: NKSYNYABFPVRNP-WODKIKDAAY
- SMILES: [Al+3].[Al+3].[O-][Mo](=O)(=O)[O-].[O-][Mo]([O-])(=O)=O.[O-][Mo]([O-])(=O)=O

Properties
Chemical formula	Al_{2}(MoO_{4})_{3}
Molar mass	533.77 g mol^{−1}
Appearance	grey, metallic solid/powder odorless
Melting point	705 °C (1,301 °F; 978 K)
Solubility in water	slightly soluble in water

Structure
Space group	P2_{1}/a, No. 14
Lattice constant	a = 15.3803(9) Å, b = 9.0443(1) Å, c = 17.888(1) Å α = 90°, β = 125.382(3)°, γ = 90°

Hazards
NFPA 704 (fire diamond)	1
- Except where otherwise noted, data are given for materials in their standard state (at 25 °C [77 °F], 100 kPa). verify (what is ?) Infobox references

Aluminium molybdate is the chemical compound Al_{2}(MoO_{4})_{3}. It forms in certain hydrodesulfurization catalysts when alumina is doped with excess molybdenum. When molybdates are used to inhibit corrosion in aluminum piping, the protective film formed is hydrated aluminum molybdate. Although small quantities of aluminum molybdate form during aluminothermic reduction of molybdia, mechanical activation inhibits their formation.

Large-scale samples can be prepared via sol-gel synthesis, and have been proposed for molybdenum-99 storage in nuclear medicine.

The room temperature crystal structure was refined using time-of-flight powder neutron diffraction data. It is monoclinic and isostructural with Fe_{2}(MoO_{4})_{3} and Cr_{2}(MoO_{4})_{3}. At high temperatures, the crystal rearranges to β‑Al_{2}(MoO_{4})_{3}, isostructural with scandium tungstate.

Aluminum molybdate has a very low thermal expansion coefficient near room temperature.
