= Calciothermic reaction =

Metallothermic reduction reaction

Calciothermic reactions are metallothermic reduction reactions (more generally, thermic chemical reactions) which use calcium metal as the reducing agent at high temperature.

Calcium is one of the most potent reducing agents available, usually drawn as the strongest oxidic reductant in Ellingham diagrams, though the lanthanides best it in this respect in oxide processes. On the other hand, this trend does not continue to other compounds that are non-oxides, and for instance lanthanum is produced by the calciothermic reduction of the chloride, calcium being a more potent reducing agent than lanthanum involving chlorides.

Calciothermic processes are used in the extraction of metals such as uranium, zirconium, and thorium from oxide ores.

An interesting way of performing calciothermic reductions is by in-situ generated metallic calcium, dissolved in molten calcium chloride, as shown in the FFC Cambridge Process.

== See also ==
- Aluminothermic reaction
- Silicothermic reaction
