= Dolomite (mineral) =

Carbonate mineral: CaMg(CO3)2

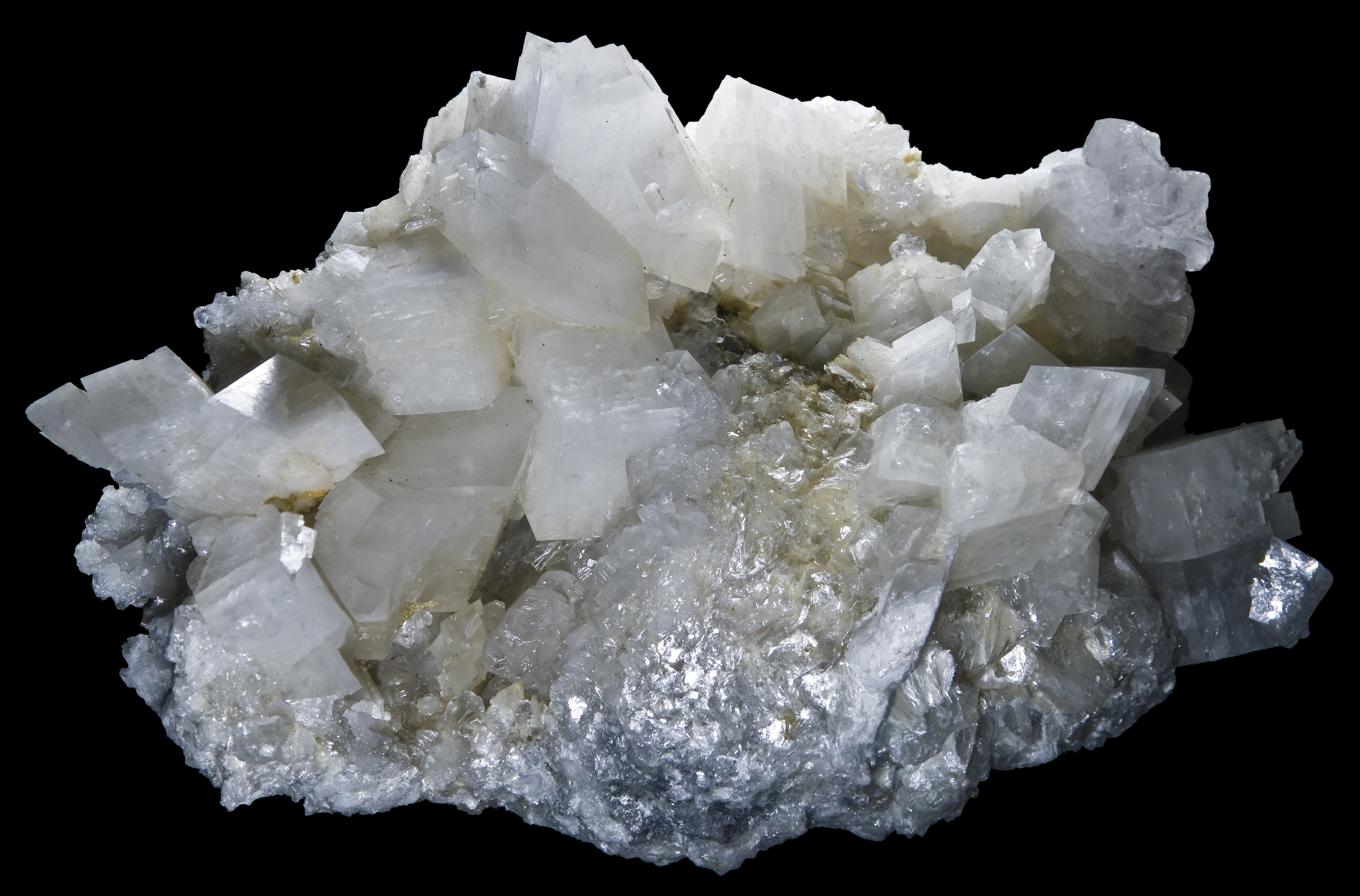
- Dolomite (white) on talc

General
- Category: Carbonate minerals
- Formula: CaMg(CO_{3})_{2}
- IMA symbol: Dol
- Strunz classification: 5.AB.10
- Crystal system: Trigonal
- Crystal class: Rhombohedral (3̅); H–M symbol: (3̅)
- Space group: R3̅
- Unit cell: a = 4.8012(1), c = 16.002 [Å]; Z = 3

Identification
- Color: White, grey to pink, reddish-white, brownish-white; colourless in transmitted light
- Crystal habit: Tabular crystals, often with curved faces, also columnar, stalactitic, granular, massive.
- Twinning: Common as simple contact twins
- Cleavage: 3 directions of cleavage not at right angles
- Fracture: Conchoidal
- Tenacity: Brittle
- Mohs scale hardness: 3.5–4.0
- Luster: Vitreous to pearly
- Streak: White
- Specific gravity: 2.84–2.86
- Optical properties: Uniaxial (−)
- Refractive index: n_{ω} = 1.679–1.681 n_{ε} = 1.500
- Birefringence: δ = 0.179–0.181
- Solubility: Poorly soluble in dilute HCl
- Other characteristics: May fluoresce white to pink under UV; triboluminescent. K_{sp} values vary between 10^{−19} and 10^{−17}

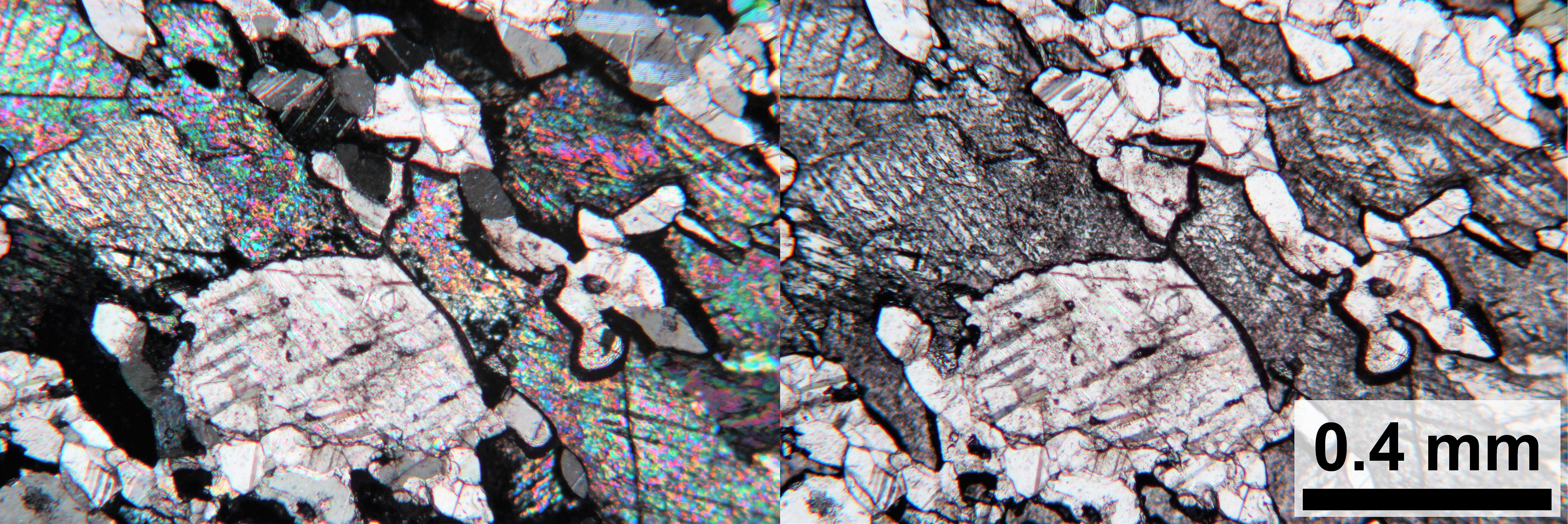
Dolomite and calcite look similar under a microscope, but thin sections can be etched and stained in order to identify the minerals. Photomicrograph of a thin section in cross and plane polarised light: the brighter mineral grains in the picture are dolomite, and the darker grains are calcite.

Dolomite (/ˈdɒl.əˌmaɪt, ˈdoʊ.lə-/) is an anhydrous carbonate mineral composed of calcium magnesium carbonate, ideally CaMg(CO_{3})_{2}. The term is also used for a sedimentary carbonate rock composed mostly of the mineral dolomite (see dolomite (rock)). An alternative name sometimes used for the dolomitic rock type is dolostone.

== History ==
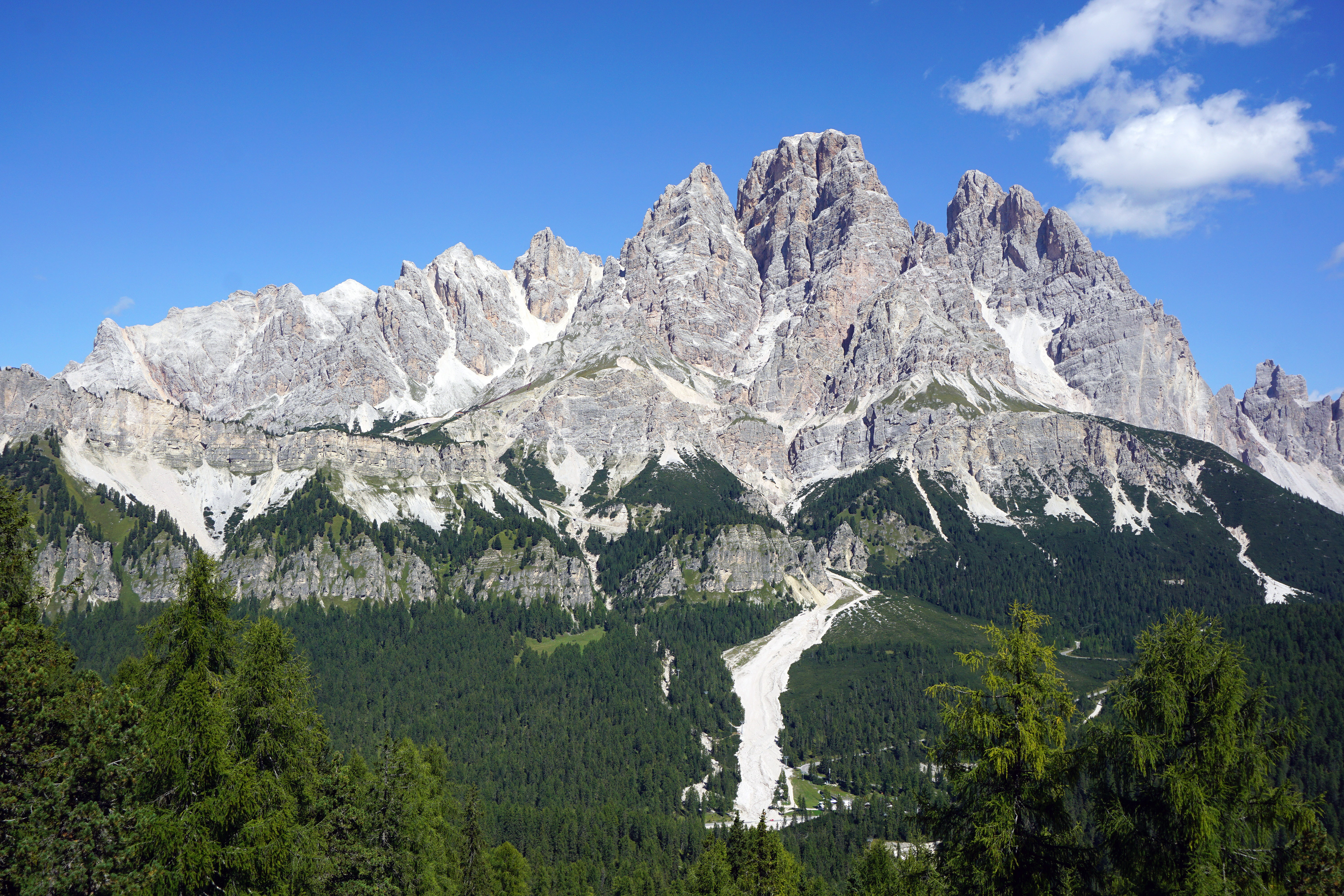
Cristallo in the Dolomites mountain range near Cortina d'Ampezzo, Italy. The Dolomite Mountains were named after the mineral.

As stated by Nicolas-Théodore de Saussure the mineral dolomite was probably first described by Carl Linnaeus in 1768. In 1791, it was described as a rock by the French naturalist and geologist Déodat Gratet de Dolomieu (1750–1801), first in buildings of the old city of Rome, and later as samples collected in the Tyrolean Alps. Nicolas-Théodore de Saussure first named the mineral (after Dolomieu) in March 1792.

== Properties ==
The mineral dolomite crystallizes in the trigonal-rhombohedral system. It forms white, tan, gray, or pink crystals. Dolomite is a double carbonate, having an alternating structural arrangement of calcium and magnesium ions. Unless it is in fine powder form, it does not rapidly dissolve or effervesce (fizz) in cold dilute hydrochloric acid as calcite does. Crystal twinning is common.

Solid solution exists between dolomite, the iron-dominant ankerite and the manganese-dominant kutnohorite. Small amounts of iron in the structure give the crystals a yellow to brown tint. Manganese substitutes in the structure also up to about three percent MnO. A high manganese content gives the crystals a rosy pink color. Lead, zinc, and cobalt also can substitute in the structure for magnesium. The mineral dolomite is closely related to huntite Mg_{3}Ca(CO_{3})_{4}.

Because dolomite can be dissolved by slightly acidic water, areas where dolomite is an abundant rock-forming mineral are important as aquifers and contribute to karst terrain formation.

== Formation ==
Modern dolomite formation has been found to occur under anaerobic conditions in supersaturated saline lagoons such as those at the Rio de Janeiro coast of Brazil, namely, Lagoa Vermelha and Brejo do Espinho. There are many other localities where modern dolomite forms, notably along sabkhas in the Persian Gulf, but also in sedimentary basins bearing gas hydrates and hypersaline lakes. It is often thought that dolomite nucleates with the help of sulfate-reducing bacteria (e.g. Desulfovibrio brasiliensis), but other microbial metabolisms have been also found to mediate in dolomite formation. In general, low-temperature dolomite may occur in natural supersaturated environments rich in extracellular polymeric substances (EPS) and microbial cell surfaces. This is likely the result from the complexation of both magnesium and calcium by carboxylic acids comprising EPS.

Vast deposits of dolomite are present in the geological record, but the mineral is relatively rare in the Cenozoic (Tertiary Era representing the last 66 million years of Earth's history) and in modern environments. Reproducible, inorganic low-temperature syntheses of dolomite remain to be performed. Usually, the initial inorganic precipitation of a metastable "precursor" (such as magnesium calcite) can easily be achieved. The precursor phase will theoretically change gradually into a more stable phase (such as partially ordered dolomite) during periodic intervals of dissolution and re-precipitation. This stabilization pathway has long been proposed as a mechanism for dolomite formation. A recent atomistic model provided theoretical support for this hypothesis; however, accompanying liquid-cell transmission electron microscopy experiments conducted at temperatures above 80 °C did not demonstrate dolomite formation under pulsed undersaturation conditions. The general principle governing the course of this irreversible geochemical reaction has been coined "breaking Ostwald's step rule". High diagenetic temperatures, such as those of groundwater flowing along deeply rooted fault systems affecting some sedimentary successions or deeply buried limestone rocks allocate dolomitization. Dolomite is also found in continental saline lakes in Australia. The geochemical conditions considered to be favourable to the precipitation of dolomite in these lakes are their high salinity, high Mg/Ca ratios, and high alkalinity. In some Neogene carbonate platforms that have not experienced elevated burial temperatures, dolomitization has been attributed to the prolonged activity of subsurface microbial communities within coastal freshwater–seawater mixing zones. Climate variability and relative sea-level fluctuations, partly influenced by Milankovitch orbital cycles, can modify groundwater circulation and cause these mixing zones to migrate through carbonate sediments. The resulting changes in fluid chemistry and redox conditions may promote microbially mediated carbonate dissolution, reprecipitation, and dolomitization over geological timescales.

A biotic synthetic experiment claims to have precipitated ordered dolomite when anoxygenic photosynthesis proceeds in the presence of manganese(II), but the authors provide no evidence for lattice ordering. Another experimental study reported the formation of substitutionally disordered, Mn-bearing dolomite on metastable magnesian kutnahorite precursors under electrochemically induced Mn redox cycling in the presence of alginate, a carboxylylate compound used as a proxy for microbial EPS. The authors interpreted these observations as evidence for a precursor-mediated crystallization pathway, in which metastable kutnahorite surfaces facilitate the nucleation and growth of dolomite-like carbonate phase. A still perplexing example of an organogenic origin is that of the reported formation of dolomite in the urinary bladder of a Dalmatian dog, possibly as the result of an illness or infection.

== Uses ==
Dolomite has attracted scientific interest as a potential mineral phase for long-term carbon dioxide sequestration through mineral carbonation. Its thermodynamic stability makes it a potentially durable host for carbon, although its precipitation at low temperatures is strongly inhibited by kinetic barriers. Research into dolomite formation in modern sedimentary environments may therefore help identify geochemical and biogeochemical processes capable of promoting carbonate mineralization under conditions relevant to geological carbon dioxide storage.

Dolomite is used as an ornamental stone, a concrete aggregate, and a source of magnesium oxide, as well as in the Pidgeon process for the production of magnesium. It is an important petroleum reservoir rock, and serves as the host rock for large strata-bound Mississippi Valley-Type (MVT) ore deposits of base metals such as lead, zinc, and copper. Where calcite limestone is uncommon or too costly, dolomite is sometimes used in its place as a flux for the smelting of iron and steel. Large quantities of processed dolomite are used in the production of float glass.

In horticulture, dolomite and dolomitic limestone are added to soils and soilless potting mixes as a pH buffer and as a magnesium source. Pastures can be limed with dolomitic lime to raise their pH and where there is a magnesium deficiency. Ground dolomite and dolomitic limestone are also widely used to remediate acidified forest soils and catchments, particularly in areas affected by atmospheric acid deposition. Dolomitic lime has also been used in environmental restoration and soil regeneration by increasing pH in soils previously affected by mining.

Dolomite is also used as the substrate in marine (saltwater) aquariums to help buffer changes in the pH of the water.

Calcined dolomite is also used as a catalyst for destruction of tar in the gasification of biomass at high temperature. Particle physics researchers like to build particle detectors under layers of dolomite to enable the detectors to detect the highest possible number of exotic particles. Because dolomite contains relatively minor quantities of radioactive materials, it can insulate against interference from cosmic rays without adding to background radiation levels.

In addition to being an industrial mineral, dolomite is highly valued by collectors and museums when it forms large, transparent crystals. The specimens that appear in the magnesite quarry exploited in Eugui, Esteribar, Navarra (Spain) are considered among the best in the world.

== See also ==
- Dolomitization – Geological process forming dolomite
- Evaporite – Water-soluble mineral deposit formed by evaporation from an aqueous solution
- Liesegang rings – Banding resulting from chemical reactions
- List of minerals
- Magnesian Limestone – Suite of carbonate rocks in England
- Main Dolomite – Rock formation in the Alps of Europe
