= Ferromanganese =

Alloy of manganese and iron

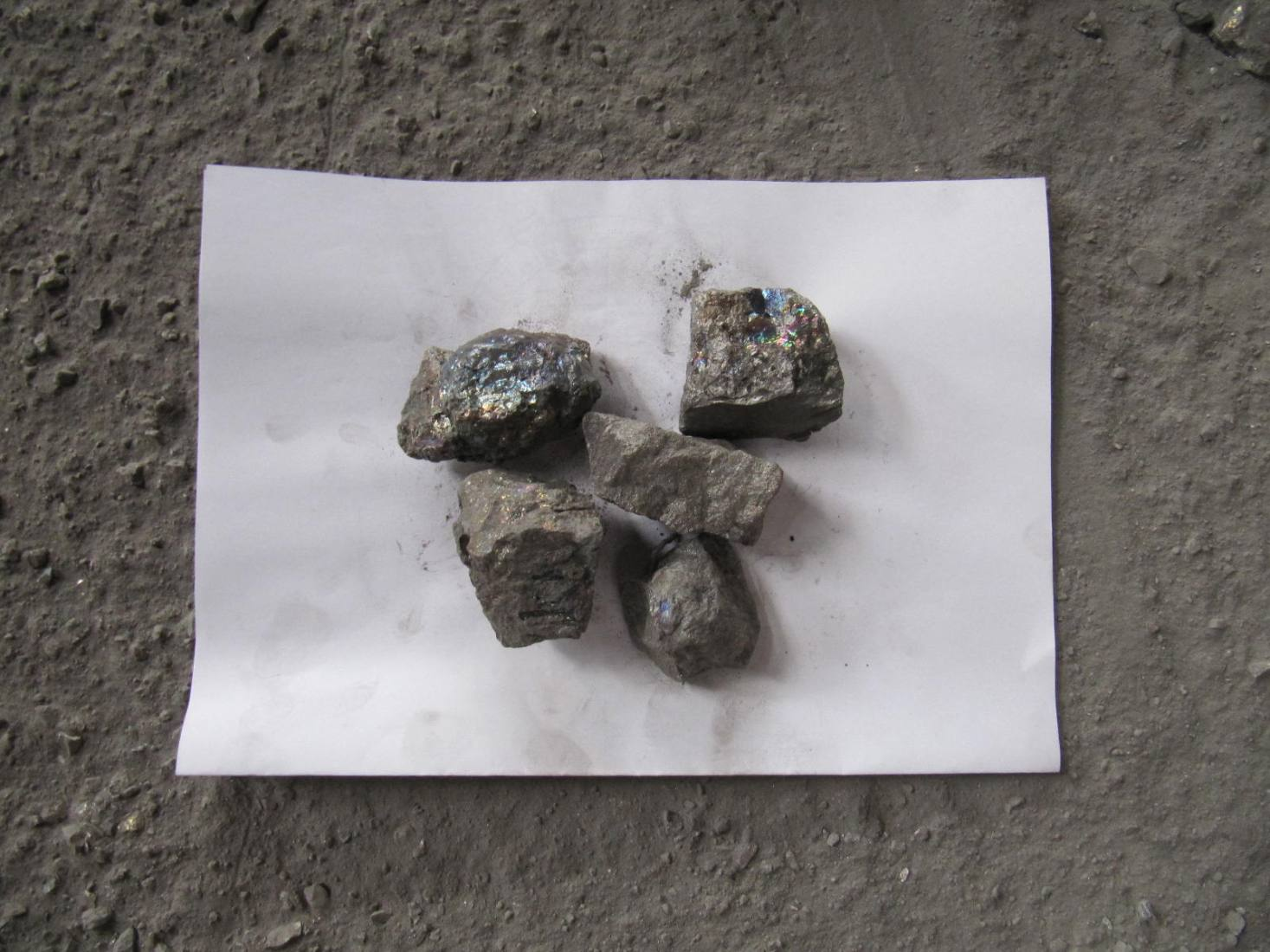
Ferromanganese metal, note mirror-like sheen responsible for German name spiegel

Ferromanganese is an alloy of iron and manganese, with other elements such as silicon, carbon, sulfur, nitrogen and phosphorus. The primary use of ferromanganese is as a type of processed manganese source to add to different types of steel, such as stainless steel. Global production of low-carbon ferromanganese (i.e. alloys with less than 2% carbon content) reached 1.5 megatons in 2010.

== Physical and chemical properties ==
The properties of ferromanganese vary considerably with the precise type and composition of the alloy. The melting point is generally between 1,200 °C (2,190 °F) and 1,300 °C (2,370 °F). The density of the alloy depend slightly on the types of impurities present, but is generally around 7.3 g/cm^{3} (0.26 lb/cu in).

== Production ==
Sources of manganese ore generally also contain iron oxides. As manganese has a more negative free energy of oxidation than iron, i.e. is chemically harder to reduce, during the reduction of manganese ore, iron is also reduced and mixed with the manganese in the melt. This is unlike other oxides such as SiO_{2}, Al_{2}O_{3} and CaO, which are more stable as oxides than manganese.

Reduction is achieved using a submerged arc furnace. There are two main industrial procedures to perform the reduction, the discard slag method (or flux method) and the duplex method (or fluxless method). Despite the name, the differences in the method are not in the addition of flux, but rather in the number of stages required. In the flux method, basic fluxes such as CaO are added in order to electrolytically reduce the manganese ore:

$\ce{2MnO + C -> 2Mn + CO2}$

The remaining slag after the reduction process has approximately 15–20% manganese content, which is usually discarded.

In the fluxless method, carbon reduction is also used in the first stage, but the fluxes added do not necessarily increase the activity of the manganese. As a result, the remaining slag has a concentration of 30% to 50% of the manganese. This is then reprocessed with quartzite to make silicomanganese alloys. The resultant discarded slag has a manganese content of less than 5%, increasing the yield. As a result, this method is used more often in industry.

In both methods, due to the addition of carbon as an reducing agent, the alloy produced is referred to as high-carbon ferromanganese (HCFM), with a carbon content of up to 6%.

A correct mix of coke, flux and ore composition is required to give high yield and reliable furnace operation, by achieving the desired chemical properties, viscosity and smelting temperature in the resulting melt. Since the iron to manganese ratio of natural manganese sources vary greatly, mixing ores from several sources is sometimes done to give a certain desired ratio.

In the manufacture of steel, low-carbon ferromanganese (LCFM) is preferred due to the ability to accurately control the amount of carbon in the resultant steel. To arrive at LCFM from HCFM, there are also two main methods: silicothermal reduction and oxygen refinement.

In silicothermal reduction, silicomanganese from the second step of the duplex process is used as a reductant. After a variety of mixing and melting steps to reduce the silicon content, a low-carbon alloy with less than 0.8% carbon and 1% silicon by weight can be obtained.

In the oxygen refinement method, HCFM is melted and heated to a high temperature of 1,750 °C (3,180 °F). Oxygen is then blown in to oxidise the carbon into CO and CO_{2}. The disadvantage of this process is that the metal is also oxidised at these high temperatures. Manganese oxide collects mainly in the form of Mn_{3}O_{4} in the dust blown out from the crucible.

== History ==
Evolution of global manganese production, by processes.

In 1856, Robert Forester Mushet "used manganese to improve the ability of steel produced by the Bessemer process to withstand rolling and forging at elevated temperatures."

In 1860, Henry Bessemer invented the use of ferromanganese as a method of introducing manganese in controlled proportions during the production of steel. The advantage of combining powdered iron oxide and manganese oxide together is the lower melting point of the combined alloy compared to pure manganese oxide.

In 1872, Lambert von Pantz produced ferromanganese in a blast furnace, with significantly higher manganese content than was previously possible (37% instead of the previous 12%). This won his company international recognition, including a gold medal at the 1873 World Exposition in Vienna and a certificate of award at the 1876 Centennial Exposition in Pennsylvania.

In an 1876 article, MF Gautier explained that the magnetic oxide needs to be slagged off by the addition of manganese (then in the form of spiegel iron) in order to befit it for rolling.

== Gallery ==
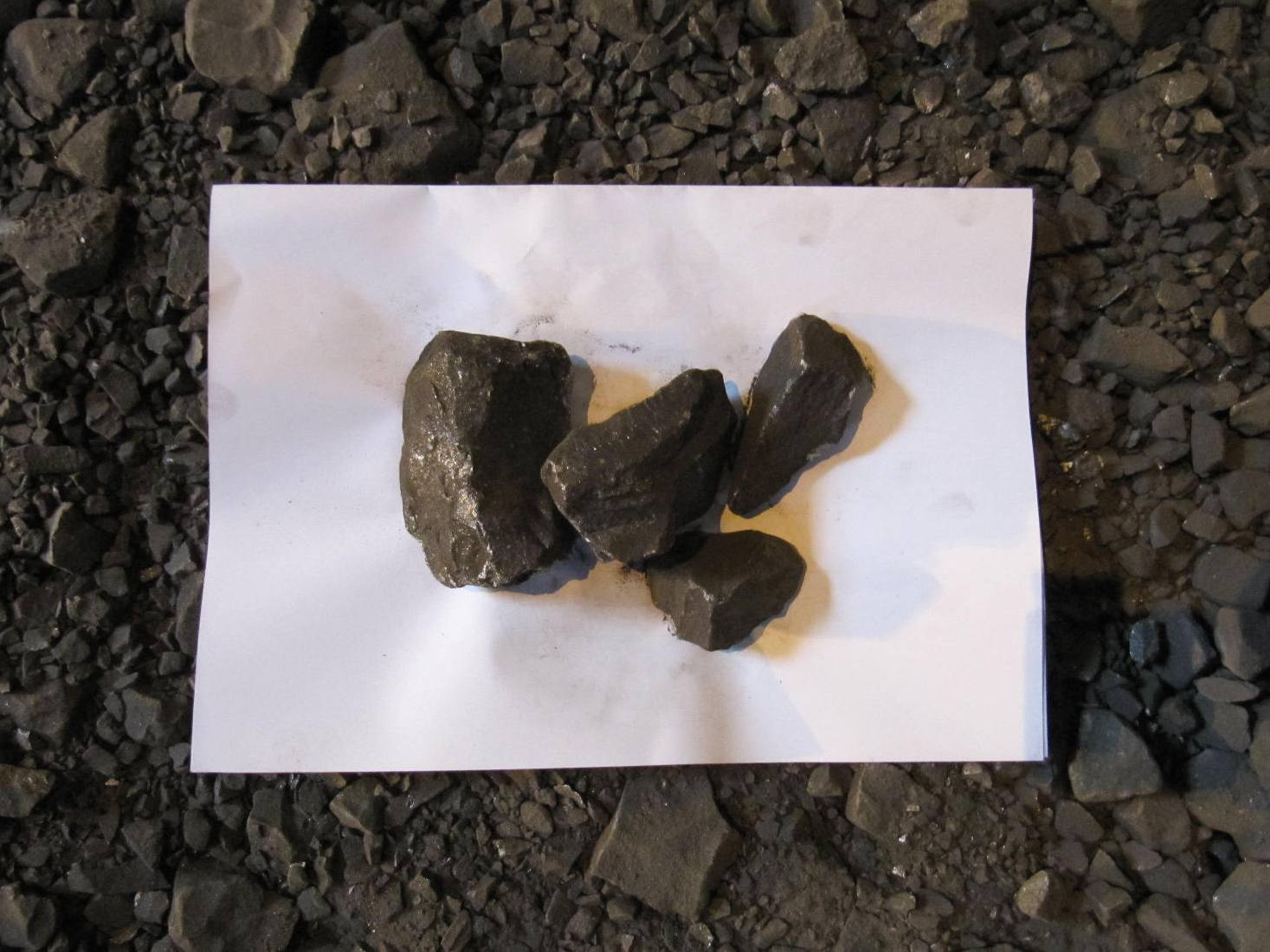
Refined ferromanganese

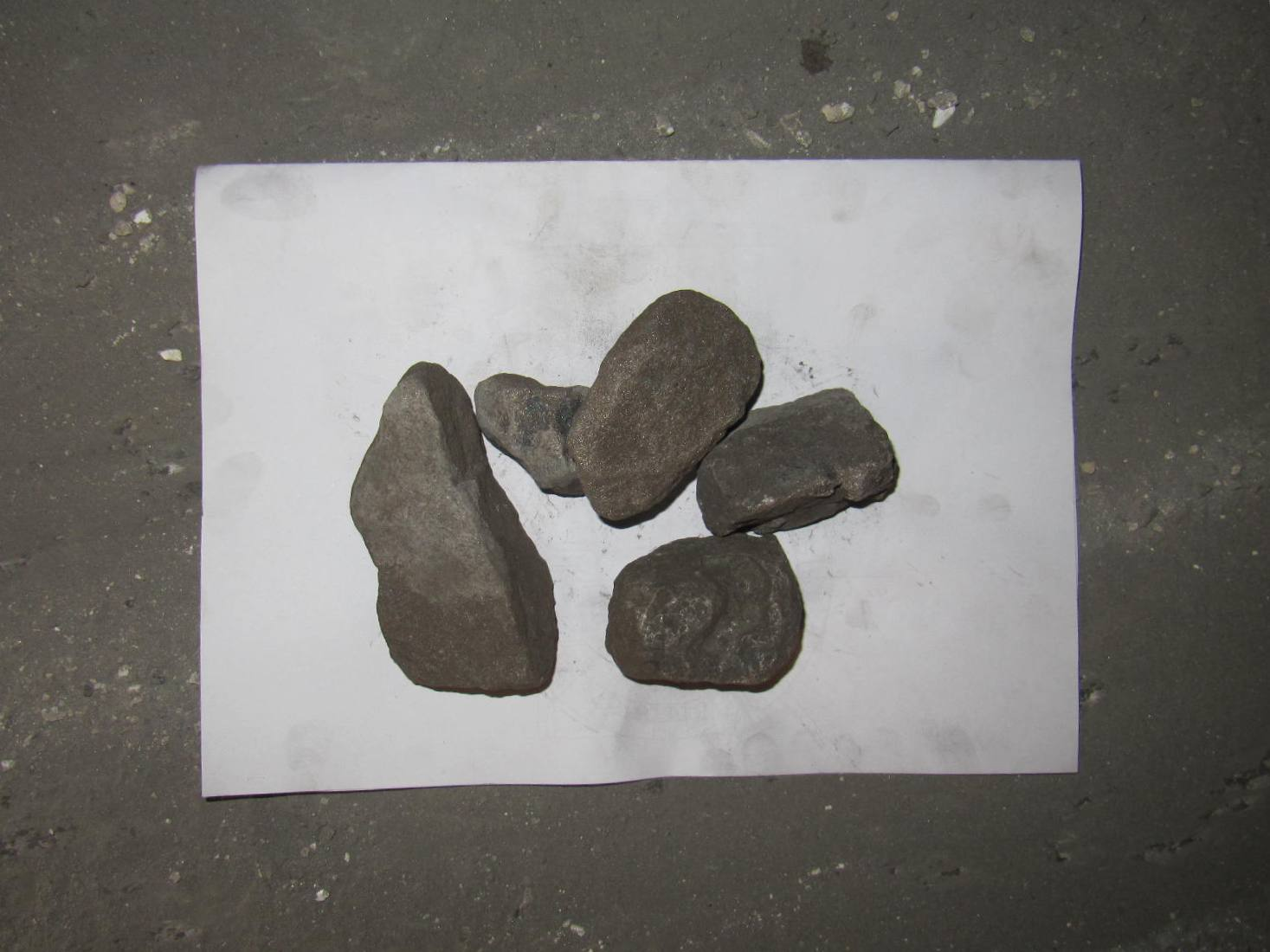
Carburized ferromanganese

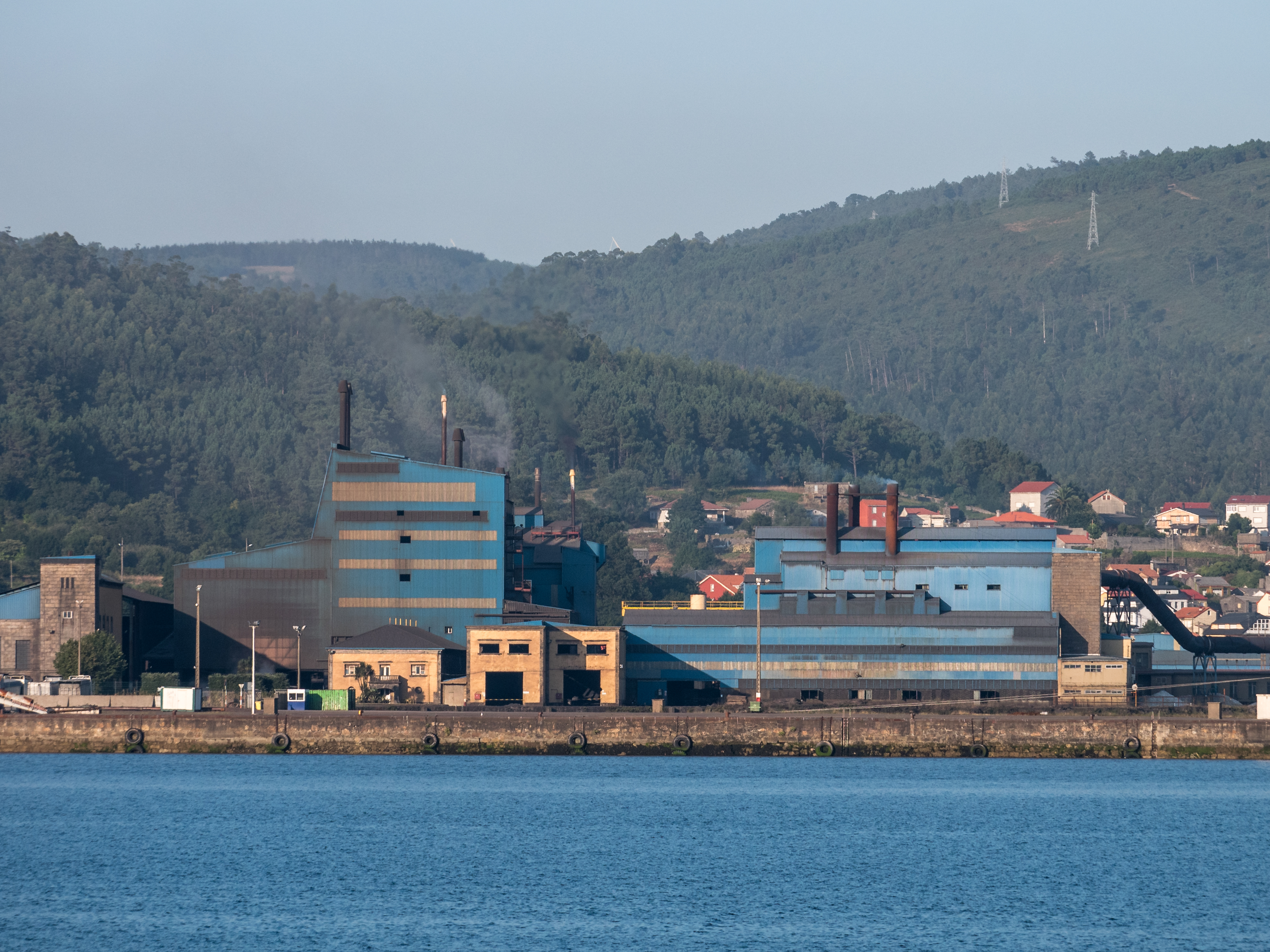
Ferromanganese plant in Puerto de Brens, La Coruña, Spain
