= Lloyd Montgomery Pidgeon =

Canadian chemist

- Born: December 3, 1903; Markham, Ontario, Canada
- Died: December 9, 1999 (aged 96)
- Education: University of Manitoba; McGill University
- Awards: Order of Canada; Order of the British Empire
- Scientific career
- Fields: Chemistry
- Workplaces: National Research Council; University of Toronto

Lloyd Montgomery Pidgeon, OC MBE (December 3, 1903 – December 9, 1999) was a Canadian chemist who developed the Pidgeon process, one of the methods of magnesium metal production, via a silicothermic reduction. He is considered the "father" of academic metallurgical research in Canada.

== Biography ==
Born in Markham, Ontario, the son of E. Leslie Pidgeon, a United Church of Canada minister, and Edith Gilker, he received a Bachelor of Arts in science from the University of Manitoba in 1925, a Master of Science from McGill University in 1927, and a Ph.D. in chemistry from McGill University in 1929.

In 1929, Pidgeon was awarded a Sir William Ramsay Memorial Fellowship from Oxford University and worked under Sir Alfred Egerton until 1931.

In 1931, he joined the National Research Council, where he discovered the process that bears his name. Because of the demand for magnesium during the Second World War, a magnesium plant was built by Dominion Magnesium Limited (DML) near Ottawa, and five more magnesium plants were built during the war in the US to his design.

Pidgeon was appointed Director of Research by DML in 1941.

In 1943, he was appointed chairman of the department of metallurgy at the University of Toronto. He retired from that post in 1969.

Pidgeon died in Kingston, Ontario at the age of 96, the author of over 50 original scientific papers as well as the holder of a number of patents in the field of chemical metallurgy.

== Honours and awards ==
In 1996, he was made an Officer of the Order of Canada. He was made a Fellow of the Royal Society of Canada in 1943, at the same time as he was awarded the Inco Medal for contributions to Extractive Metallurgy. The next year, he was given the Civil Service Professional Association Medal and the McCharles Prize, from the University of Toronto for outstanding work in Canadian Metallurgy. In 1946, he became a Member of the Order of the British Empire. In 1967, he received the Alcan Medal for his contribution to the field of Metallurgy. He also received the Monel Medal from Columbia University for distinguished achievements in Mineral Technology. He was inducted into the Canadian Mining Hall of Fame.

== Family ==
Pidgeon married Frances Rundle. They had two children.
