= Marignac =

- Jean Charles Galissard de Marignac (1817–1894) was a Swiss chemist
- Marignac's salt is potassium oxyfluorotantalate

Marignac is the name or part of the name of the following communes in France:

- Marignac, Charente-Maritime, in the Charente-Maritime department
- Marignac, Haute-Garonne, in the Haute-Garonne department
- Marignac, Tarn-et-Garonne, in the Tarn-et-Garonne department
- Marignac-en-Diois, in the Drôme department
- Marignac-Lasclares, in the Haute-Garonne department
- Marignac-Laspeyres, in the Haute-Garonne department
