= Aluminothermic reaction =

Heat-producing chemical reactions with aluminum

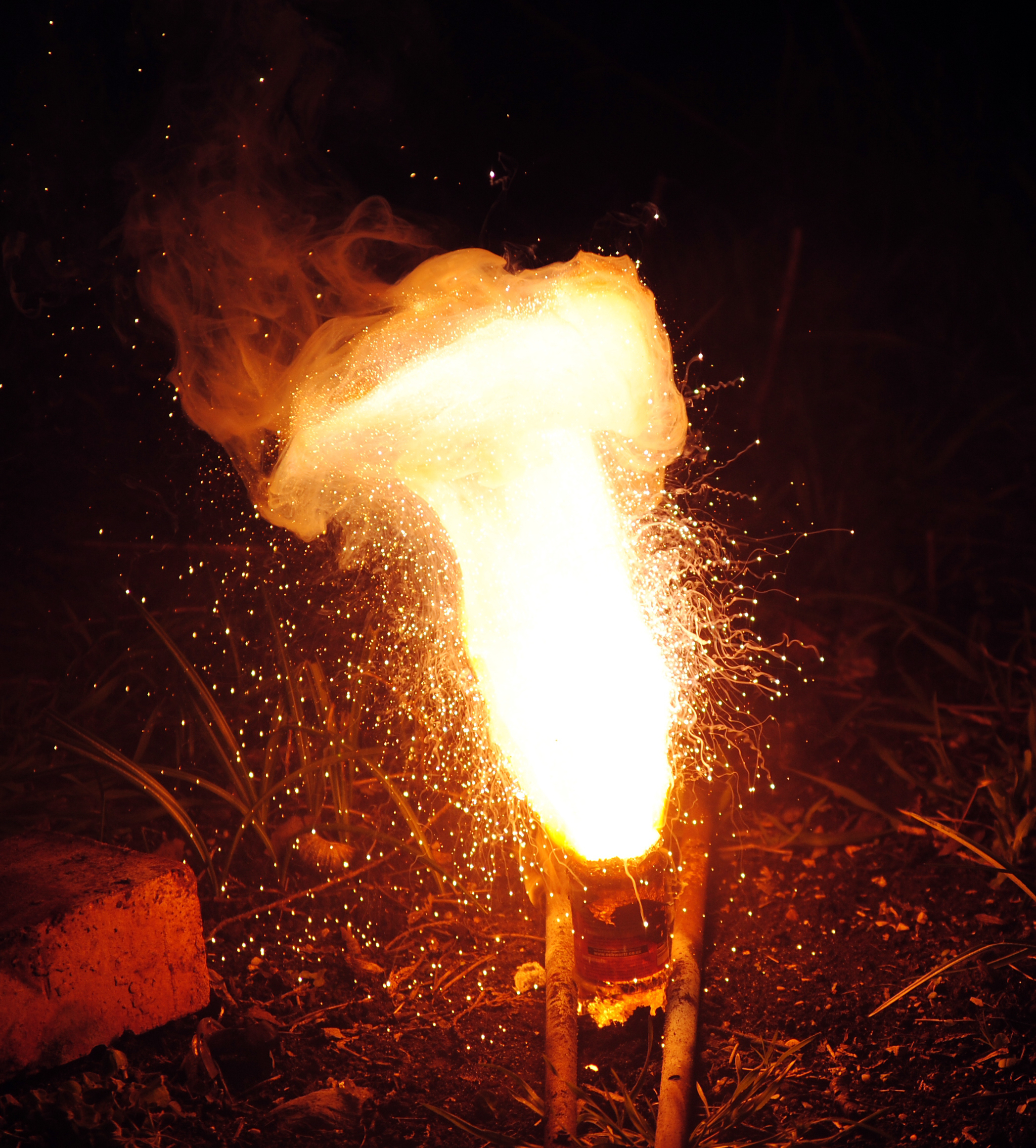
An aluminothermic reaction using iron(III) oxide. The sparks flying outwards are globules of molten iron trailing smoke in their wake.

Video of aluminothermic reaction to make stainless steel from iron ore

Aluminothermic reactions are exothermic chemical reactions using aluminium as the reducing agent at high temperature. The process is industrially useful for production of alloys of iron. The most prominent example is the thermite reaction between iron oxides and aluminium to produce iron itself:

Fe_{2}O_{3} + 2 Al → 2 Fe + Al_{2}O_{3}

This specific reaction is however not relevant to the most important application of aluminothermic reactions, the production of ferroalloys. For the production of iron, a cheaper reducing agent, coke, is used instead via the carbothermic reaction.

== History ==
Aluminothermy started from the experiments of Russian scientist Nikolay Beketov at the University of Kharkiv in Ukraine, who proved that aluminium restored metals from their oxides under high temperatures.

The reaction was first used for the carbon-free reduction of metal oxides. The reaction is highly exothermic, but it has a high activation energy since strong interatomic bonds in the solids must be broken first. The oxide was heated with aluminium in a crucible in a furnace. The runaway reaction made it possible to produce only small quantities of material.

Hans Goldschmidt improved the aluminothermic process between 1893 and 1898, by igniting the mixture of fine metal oxide and aluminium powder by a starter reaction without heating the mixture externally. The process was patented in 1898 and used extensively in the later years for rail track welding.

== Applications ==
The aluminothermic reaction is used for the production of several ferroalloys, for example ferroniobium from niobium pentoxide and ferrovanadium from iron, vanadium(V) oxide, and aluminium. The process begins with the reduction of the oxide by the aluminium:

3 V_{2}O_{5} + 10 Al → 5 Al_{2}O_{3} + 6 V

Other metals can be produced from their oxides in the same way.

Aluminothermic reactions have been used for welding rail tracks on-site, useful for complex installations or local repairs that cannot be done using continuously welded rail. Another common use is the welding of copper cables (wire) for use in direct burial (grounding/earthing) applications. It is still the only type of electrical connection recognized by the IEEE (IEEE, Std 80–2001) as continuous un-spliced cable.

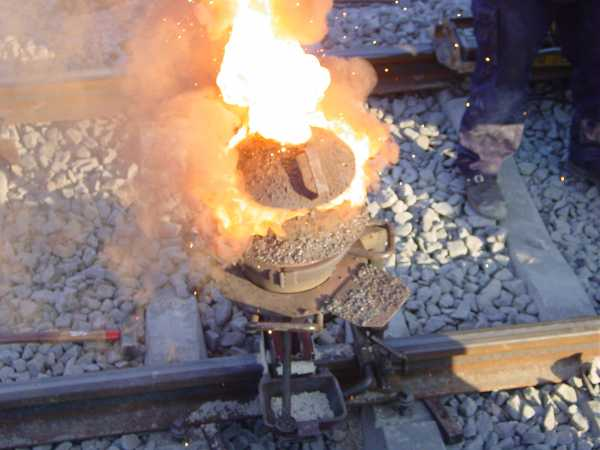
Rail track welding by thermite

== See also ==
- Thermite
- Calciothermic reaction
- Silicothermic reaction
