= Pidgeon process =

Method of producing magnesium metal

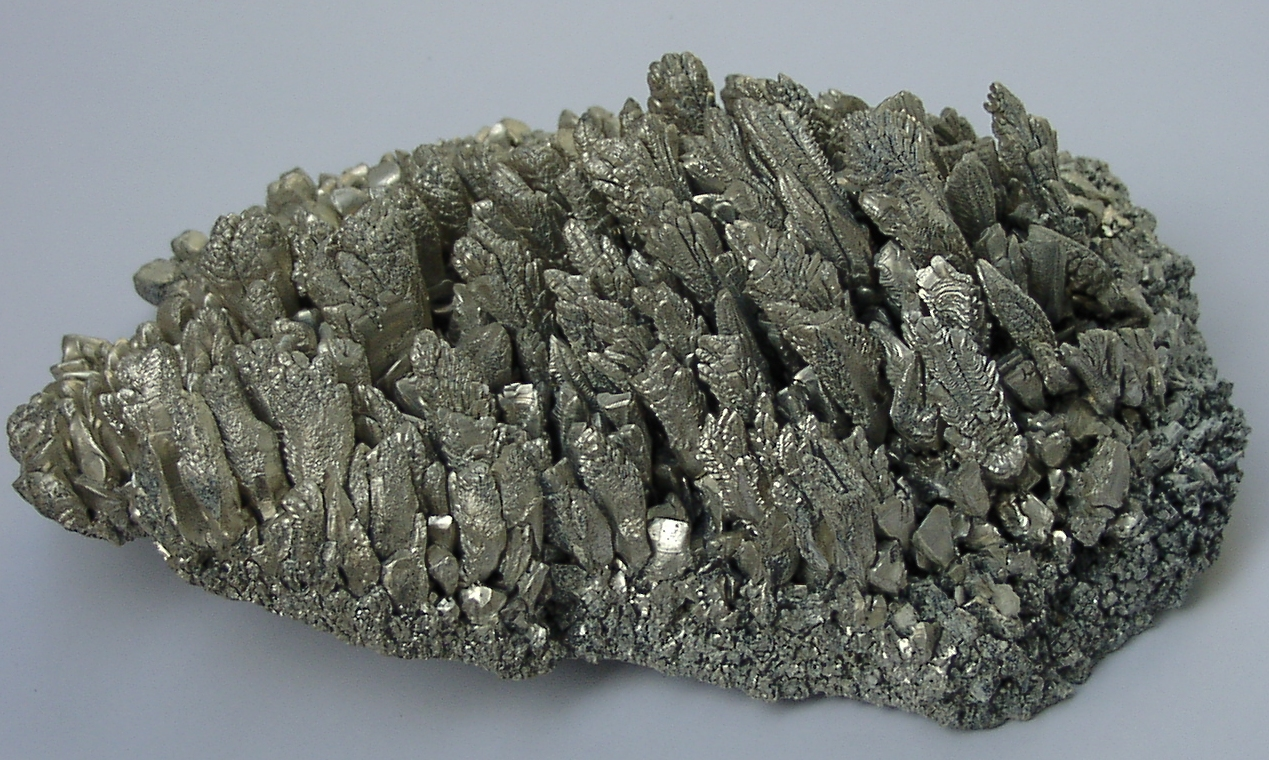
Vapor-deposited magnesium crystals from the Pidgeon process

The Pidgeon process is a practical method for smelting magnesium. The most common method involves the raw material, dolomite, being fed into an externally heated reduction tank and then thermally reduced to metallic magnesium using 75% ferrosilicon as a reducing agent in a vacuum. Overall the processes in magnesium smelting via the Pidgeon process involve dolomite calcination, grinding and pelleting, and vacuum thermal reduction.

Besides the Pidgeon process, electrolysis of magnesium chloride for commercial production of magnesium is also used, especially for magnesite ores, which at one point in time accounted for 75% of the world's magnesium production.

By 2000, it took between 17 and 20 kilowatt-hours per kilogram of magnesium produced by the Pidgeon process. The Pidgeon processes in Canada in the year 2000 all used sulfur hexafluoride (SF_{6}) to cover the reaction so as not to introduce stray oxygen to it. Research to replace SF_{6} with boron trifluoride was underway in 2000. By 2011, magnesium production had departed under the Kyoto Protocol from Canada. Wu, Han and Liu claimed that "China is the world's largest producer of primary magnesium and has a magnesium smelting industry that is mainly based on the Pidgeon process" in an era in which China had obtained an 80% market share of production of magnesium metal.

== Chemistry ==
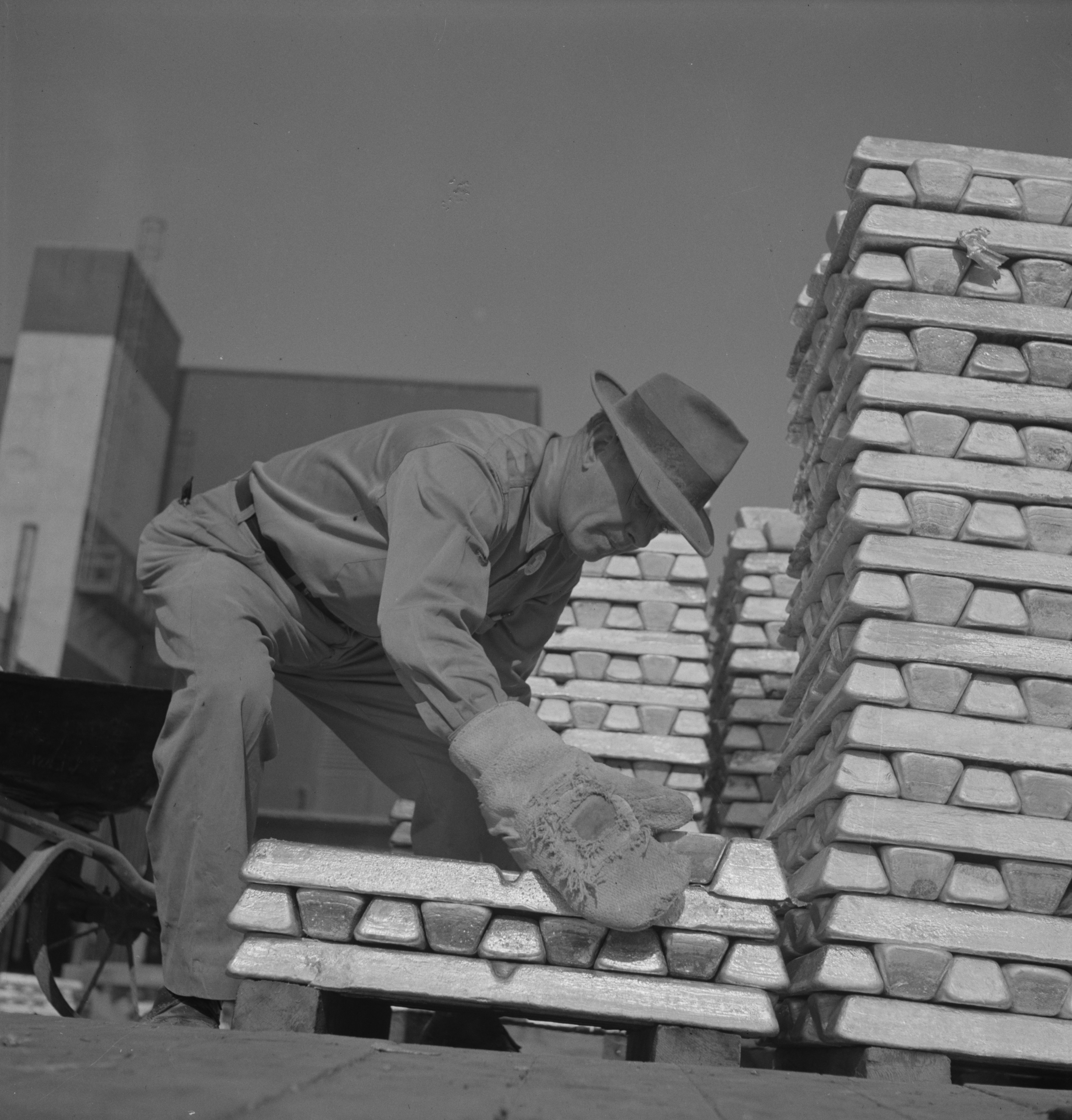
Enormous asbestos mittens must be worn by men handling the thousands of hot magnesium ingots produced daily at Basic Magnesium's giant plant in the southern Nevada desert in Gabbs, Nevada near Las Vegas. Full operation commenced in the summer of 1943.

The general reaction that occurs in the Pidgeon process is:

2 MgO·CaO + Si → 2 Mg + Ca_{2}SiO_{4}

For industrial use, ferrosilicon is used in place of pure silicon because its cheaper and more readily available. The iron from the alloy is a spectator in the reaction. CaC_{2} may also be used as an even cheaper alternative for silicon and ferrosilicon, but is disadvantageous because it decreases the magnesium yield slightly.

The magnesium raw material of this type of reaction is magnesium oxide, which is obtained in many ways. In all cases, the raw materials must be calcined to remove both water and carbon dioxide. Magnesium oxide can also be obtained from sea or lake water magnesium chloride hydrolyzed to hydroxide. The Mg(OH)_{2} is thermally dehydrated. Another option is to use mined magnesite (MgCO_{3}) calcined to magnesium oxide.

The most used raw material is mined dolomite, a mixed (Ca,Mg)CO_{3}, where the calcium oxide present in the reaction zone scavenges the silica formed, releasing heat and consuming one of the products, ultimately helping push the equilibrium to the right.

(1) Dolomite calcination

CaCO_{3}·MgCO_{3} → MgO·CaO + 2 CO_{2}

(2) Reduction

2 MgO·CaO + Si → 2 Mg + Ca_{2}SiO_{4}

The Pidgeon process is an endothermic reaction ($\bigtriangleup$H° ~183.0 kJ/mol_{Si}). Thermodynamically speaking, the temperatures decrease when the vacuum is used for both MgO and calcined dolomite.

== Summary of Pidgeon process using dolomite ==
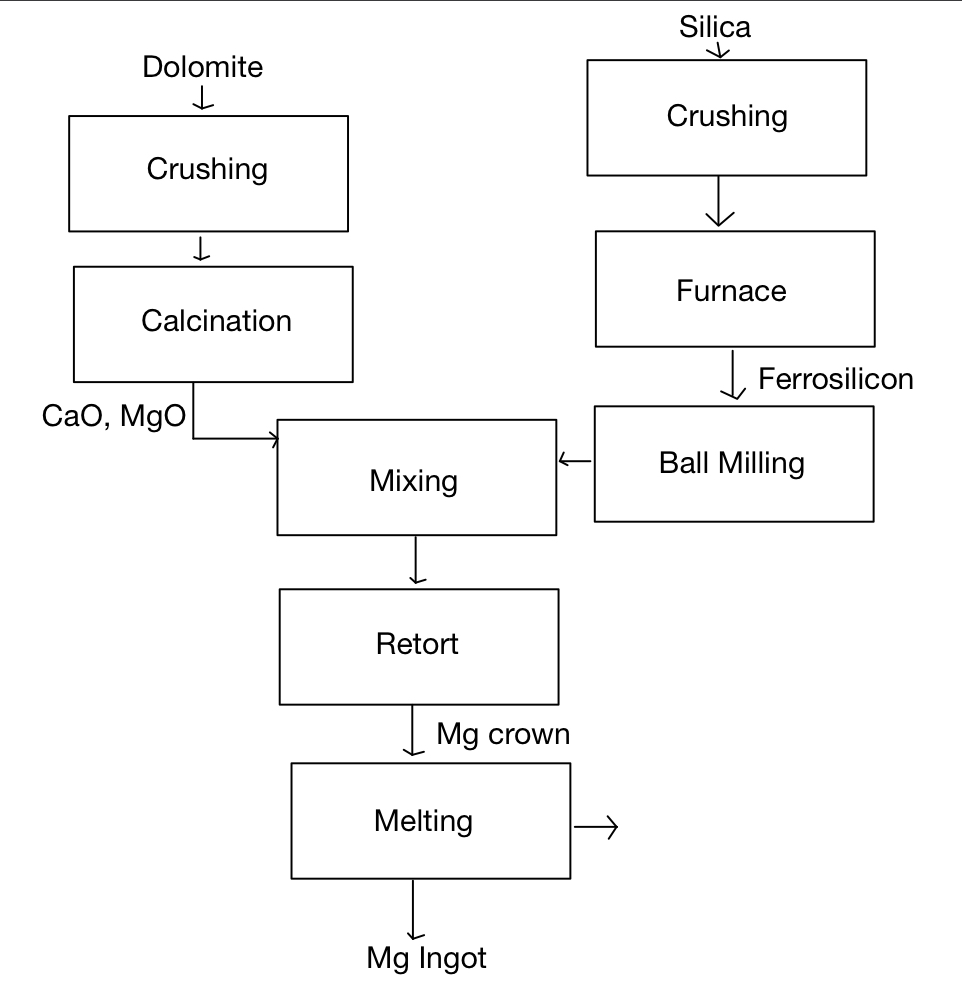
Flow chart showing steps taken during the Pidgeon process

=== Chinese variant ===
The Chinese Pidgeon process is described here by Wu, Han and Liu. Being an endothermic reaction, heat is applied to initiate and sustain the reaction. This heat requirement may be very high. To keep reaction temperatures low, the processes are operated under pressure. The rotary kiln is typically used in dolomite calcination. In the rotary kiln, the raw material, calcinated dolomite, is mixed with the finely ground reducing agent, ferrosilicon and the catalyst, fluorite. The materials are mixed together and pressed into sphere shaped pellets and the mixed materials are charged into cylindrical nickel chromium steel retorts. A number of retorts are placed in a furnace in sealed paper bags to avoid moisture absorption so that calcined dolomite activity doesn't reduce magnesium yield. The pellets are then placed into a reduction tank and heated to 1200 °C. The inside of the furnace is vacuumed with a 13.3 Pa or higher, to produce magnesium vapour. Magnesium crystals are removed from the condensers, slag is removed as a solid, and the retort is recharged. The crude magnesium is refined via flux, and commercial magnesium ingot is produced. The authors nowhere identify the name or the characteristics of the flux.

Typical flux composition is 49 wt% anhydrous magnesium chloride, 27 wt% potassium chloride, 20 wt% barium chloride and 4 wt% calcium fluoride.

=== Canadian variant ===
The Canadian variant is described here with reference to the Chinese variant. In 2000, Canada had three magnesium smelters. All three used SF_{6} as cover gas to prevent oxidation and combustion of exposed surfaces of magnesium, which is at STP highly combustible. The SF_{6} cover gas had been in use at that point for over 20 years by all industries which dealt with raw magnesium. Canadian industry was tasked to discover a suitable alternative cover gas in order not to be sacrificed to Action Plan 2000 on Climate Change. SF_{6} had been deemed to have a Global Warming Potential (GWP) factor of 23,900 times that of CO_{2}. By 2011, magnesium production had departed from Canada because of the Kyoto Protocol.

== Other routes for magnesium processing ==
Many technologies have been developed for producing magnesium metal. These approaches can be broadly classified as electrolytic and thermic. The main manifestation of the electrolytic is the Dow process. The main application of thermic routes is the Pidgeon process. The Bolzano process merits mention because it is very similar to the Pidgeon process except that the heating is achieved through electric heating conductors and retorts are placed vertically into large blocks in the Bolzano process. The Pidgeon process is less technologically complex and because of distillation/vapour deposition conditions, a high purity product is easily achievable.

== Disadvantages of the Pidgeon process ==
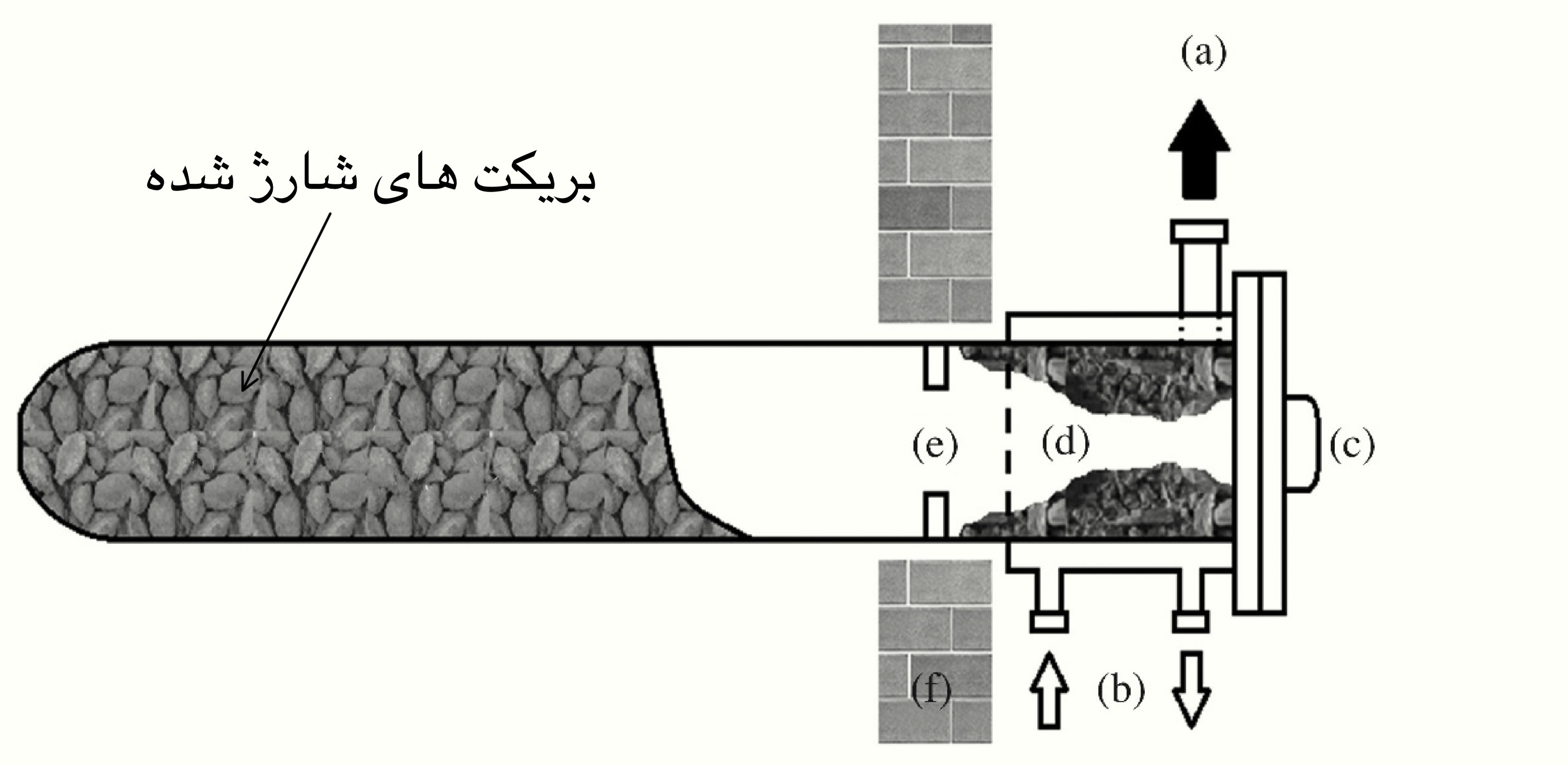
Schematic cut of a retort: (a) outlet for creating a vacuum, (b) cold water inlet and outlet, (c) retort door, (d) magnesium crown, (e) heat shield, and (f) retort furnace wall.

Although the Pidgeon process has many advantages, there are some environmental disadvantages of the process as well. With the increased demand for magnesium in recent years, production through ore reduction has been emitting larger amounts of carbon dioxide and particulate matter. There are environmental impacts because to create lightweight materials in the first place, more energy is needed compared to the material being replaced, typically iron or steel. Approximately 10.4 kg of coal is burned and 37 kg of carbon dioxide is released per 1 kg of magnesium obtained, compared with less than 2 kg of carbon dioxide to produce 1 kg of steel. In China, production of magnesium using the Pidgeon process has a 60% higher global warming impact than aluminum, a competing metal mass-produced in the country as well.

== History ==
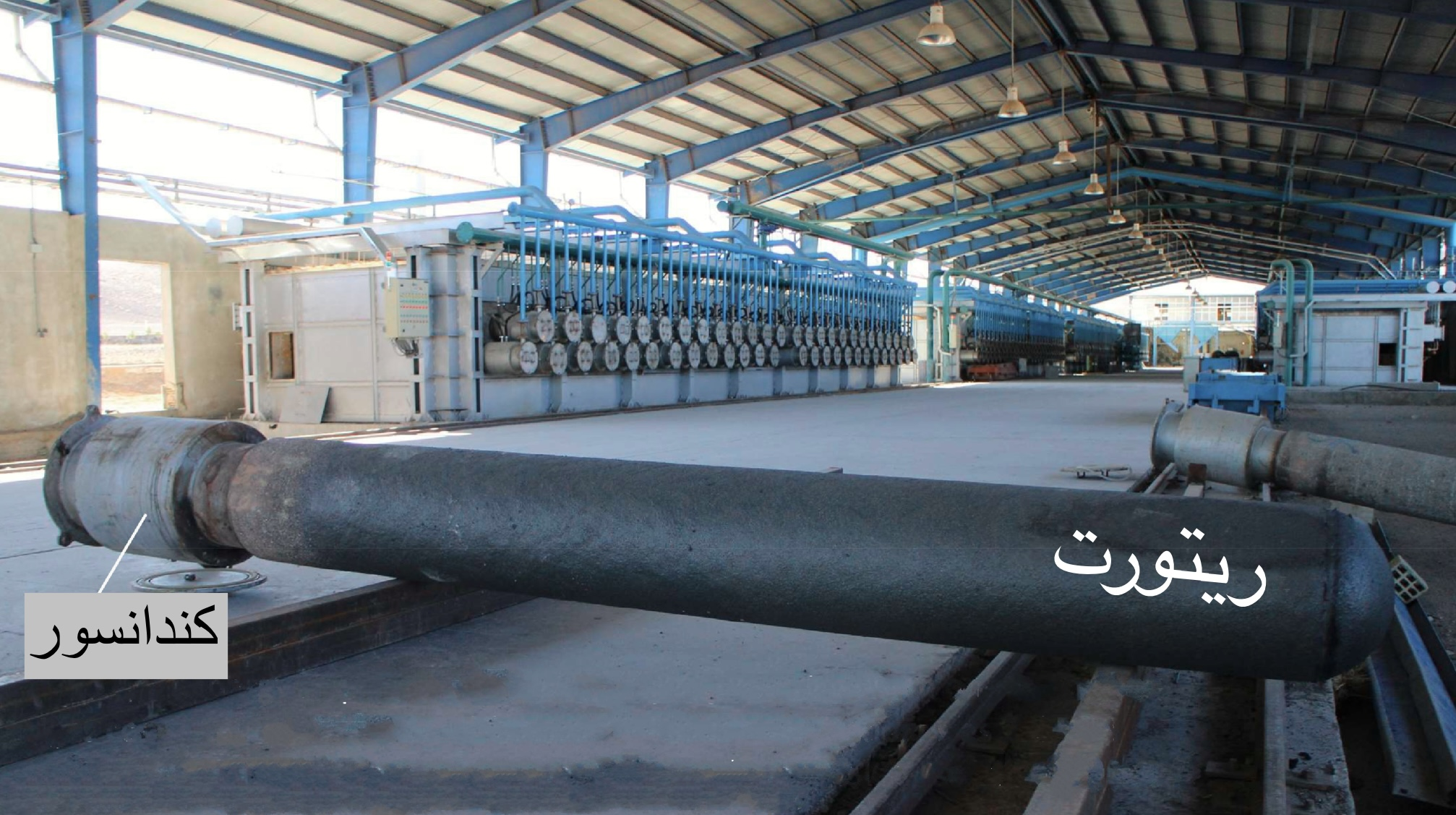
Retort storage at modern Iranian production plant

The silicothermic reduction of dolomite was first developed by Amati in 1938 at the University of Padua. Immediately afterward, an industrial production was established in Bolzano (Italy), using what is now better known as the Bolzano process.

A few years later in 1939, when Canada and its allies entered WW2, they were short on supplies that required magnesium such as bombs, other military devices and aluminum alloys needed for aircraft. Dr. Lloyd Montgomery Pidgeon at the National Research Council was able to create a method for extracting magnesium from dolomite in a vacuum at high temperature with ferrosilicon as the reducing agent. At this time, the ferrosilicon method was known, however it had yet to be commercialized. By early 1942, a successful pilot test took place.

Since then, the Pidgeon process has continually been widely used, especially in China, the world's largest magnesium producer.
