= Bolzano process =

The Bolzano process is a means to reduce magnesium to metallic form. "Dolomite-ferrosilicon briquettes are stacked on a special charge support system through which internal electric heating is conducted to the charge. A complete reaction takes 20 to 24 hours at 1,200 °C."

In 2014, Brazilian operations produced 10-15 kilotons of Mg by this process.

Also in 2014, Nevada Clean Magnesium announced its Tami-Mosi plan to create a ASTM B-92 pilot plant. The mineral resource is estimated at 412 billion tons of 12.3% grade Mg. The company produced its first ingot from a pilot plant in December 2018.
