= Snake River (Renfrew County) =

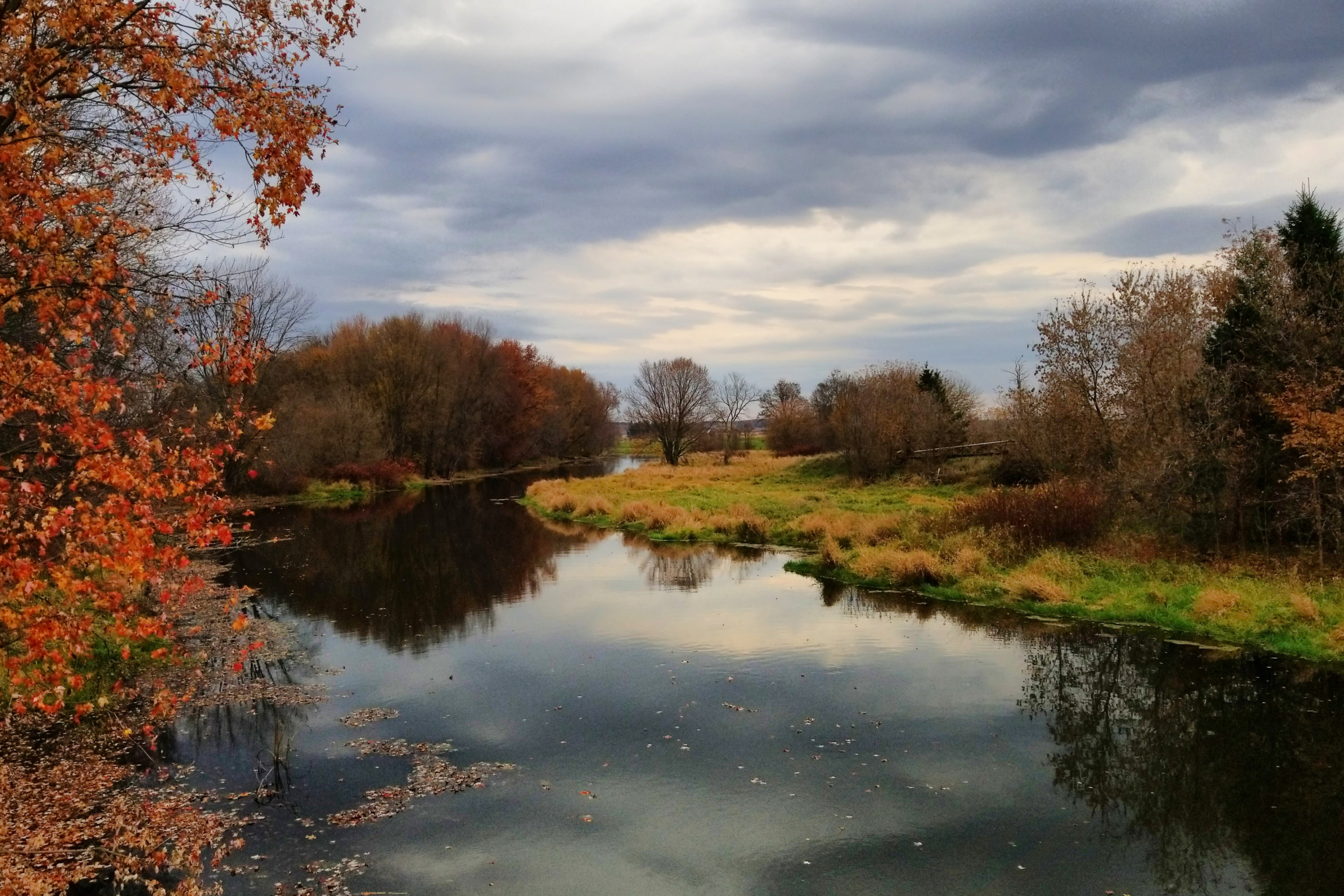

- Location of the mouth of the Snake River in Ontario

Location
- Country: Canada
- Province: Ontario
- County: Renfrew
- Townships: Whitewater Region; Admaston–Bromley; North Algona-Wilberforce

Physical characteristics
- Source: Lake Doré
  - location: North Algona-Wilberforce
  - coordinates: 45°38′16″N 77°05′01″W
  - elevation: 142 m (466 ft)
- Mouth: Muskrat Lake
  - location: Whitewater Region (township)
  - coordinates: 45°41′48″N 76°55′40″W
  - elevation: 122 m (400 ft)
- Length: 28 km (17 mi)

Basin features
- River system: Saint Lawrence River drainage basin
- Tributaries
  - right: Mink Creek

The Snake River is a river in Renfrew County, Ontario, Canada.

== Course ==
The river begins at Lake Doré in North Algona-Wilberforce township. It flows east under Ontario Highway 41, then south past the community of Lake Dore. It then turns east, takes in the right tributary Mink Creek, travels through the Upper Osceola Marsh, and reaches the community of Osceola in Admaston–Bromley township. It heads north through the Snake River Marsh, a proposed Provincial Conservation Reserve site, then flows east through the community of Snake River in Whitewater Region township, under Ontario Highway 17, and reaches its mouth at Muskrat Lake on the Muskrat River, a tributary of the Ottawa River.

== Tributaries ==
- Mink Creek (right)

== See also ==
- List of rivers of Ontario
