= Buttermilk Creek (Renfrew County) =

- Location of the mouth of Buttermilk Creek in southern Ontario

Location
- Country: Canada
- Province: Ontario
- Region: Eastern Ontario
- County: Renfrew
- Township: Whitewater Region

Physical characteristics
- Source: Astrolabe Lake
  - coordinates: 45°36′19″N 76°50′17″W
  - elevation: 148 m (486 ft)
- Mouth: Muskrat River
  - coordinates: 45°37′25″N 76°52′10″W
  - elevation: 126 m (413 ft)
- Length: 3.9 km (2.4 mi)

Basin features
- River system: Saint Lawrence River drainage basin

Buttermilk Creek is a tributary of the Muskrat River in the township of Whitewater Region, Renfrew County, Ontario, Canada.

== Course ==
Buttermilk Creek begins at Astrolabe Lake, formerly Green Lake and within the grounds of Logos Land water park, and travels 3.9 kilometres (2.4 mi) before reaching its mouth at the Muskrat River near the community of Cobden. The Muskrat River empties into the Ottawa River at Pembroke.

== Economy ==
Ontario Highway 17 parallels the lower two-thirds of the creek. Buttermilk Creek Trout Farm, in operation raising rainbow trout for more than 20 years, is located on the creek banks.

== See also ==
- List of rivers of Ontario
