= Cobden, Ontario =

Cobden
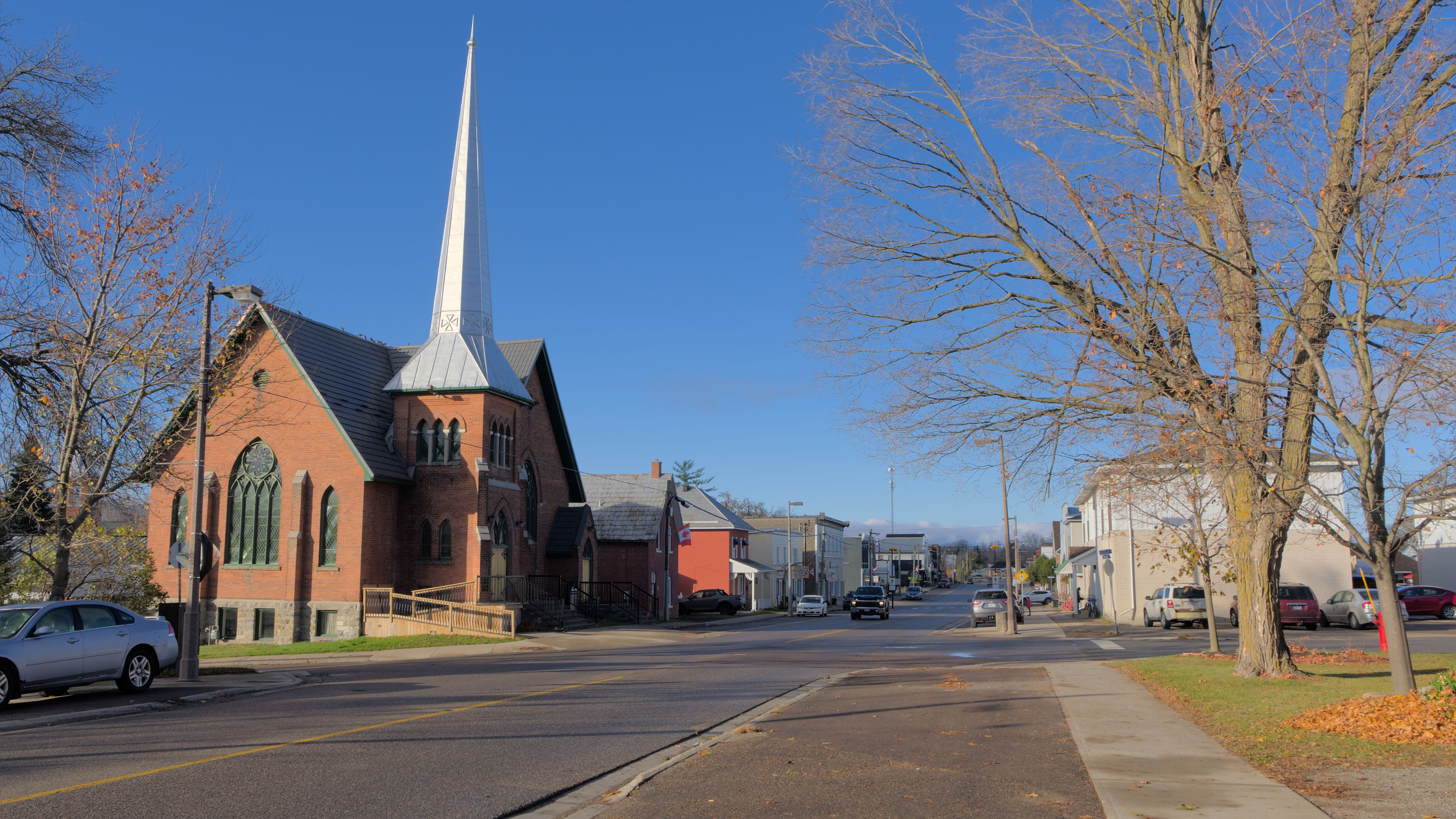
- Main Street in Cobden

- Location within Renfrew County Location within Southern Ontario
- Coordinates: 45°37′37″N 76°52′53″W
- Country: Canada
- Province: Ontario
- County: Renfrew
- Post office: 1850
- Incorporated village: 1900

Area
  - Total: 1.85 km^{2} (0.71 sq mi)
- Elevation: 145 m (476 ft)

Population (2021)
  - Total: 1,071
- Time zone: UTC−05:00 (EST)
  - Summer (DST): UTC−04:00 (EDT)
- Postal Code FSA: K0J
- Area codes: 613

Cobden is a small community in the Township of Whitewater Region, in Renfrew County, Ontario, Canada. It is located 95 kilometres (59 mi) northwest of Ottawa, and roughly halfway between Renfrew and Pembroke on Highway 17. Cobden sits adjacent to Muskrat Lake, which is located northeast of the town.

== History ==
The area around Cobden was originally inhabited by the Algonquin Anishinaabe people. In 1613, explorers traveling through the area recorded that the lake was home to a group of Algonquin, led by a man named Nibachis. Muskrat Lake was originally named Lac de Nibachis in his honour.

=== Champlain's astrolabe ===
In 1613, the French explorer Samuel de Champlain travelled through an area very near Cobden while he was exploring the Ottawa River. The Chenaux Rapids forced Champlain and his men to portage. They presumably took shore in Browns Bay, near present-day McKenzie's Hill.

Champlain's trail from that point is debatable. He may have cut straight across land to the southern tip of Jeffreys Lake, or he may have veered south, and skirted the far side of what later came to be known as the Champlain Trail Lakes. It is known that he eventually made his way to Green Lake, and it was at that point, that Champlain potentially lost his astrolabe. It stayed there for 254 years, until it was found in 1867 by Edward George Lee, a 14-year-old farm boy helping his father clear trees near Green Lake (now Astrolabe Lake) which is located just south of Cobden.

Edward gave the astrolabe to Captain Cowley, a Steamboat Captain on Muskrat Lake, and Cowley sold the astrolabe to his employer, the president of the Ottawa Forwarding Company, R.W. Cassels. The astrolabe eventually passed to Samuel V. Hoffman of the New York Historical Society in 1942, remained there for 47 years, and was acquired by the Department of Communications for the Canadian Museum of Civilization in 1989.

=== Founding and development ===
==== Early years ====
Cobden's very existence is a circumstance of location. As Pembroke and Ottawa grew so, the gap between them seemed to grow as well. In the 1800s, the easiest route between them was the Ottawa River. However, the presence of rapids near Portage du Fort necessitated a land route. The area was mostly a vast forest untouched by Europeans. A few settlers had put down near muskrat lake, (John Parsons, John Sheriff, Spencer Allen, Robert Allen, and others), but for the most part, there had been little activity since Champlain's visit in the 17th century.

Then, in 1849, Jason Gould built a road from what came to be called Goulds Landing to what would become Cobden on Muskrat Lake. One could catch a steamer down the lake and then go on by road to Pembroke. The traffic on the road was a cause for growth. In 1850, Gould built a post office and named the fledgling settlement Cobden after Richard Cobden, a member of British Parliament whom Gould admired.

By October 2, 1876, the railway had crept its way to Cobden. The community started to expand from the lake towards the railway station further inland. Main Street began to take shape, with The Cobden Sun, a Bank of Ottawa, black smith shops, a bakery, general store, mill, surgeon, and jewelry store. In 1880, a public school was opened to accommodate the strain on nearby S.S.No 1. Cobden was soon the largest community in Ross Township and became an incorporated village in October 1901.

==== 1901-present ====
Cobden has been the victim of many fires, which have destroyed almost all of the original buildings. Main Street has suffered worst from fire, including one in 1913 that destroyed the Cobden Sun building and many historical records.

A hydroelectric dam began operating at the falls south of Cobden. It supplied the town off and on with power until it was destroyed on April 12, 1934, in a raging flood. Large blocks of ice ripped the dam apart, poured over Highway 17, and tore away sections of pavement. The plant operator, Mr. Bill Wall, was stranded in the upper section of their house until flooding subsided. The town then started receiving power from a station in Calabogie.

Council elections in 1949 were dominated by the issue of whether or not to hold another plebiscite on establishing a waterworks system. A previous plebiscite had come out 82–56 against the idea, but times were changing quickly. After the war a new council was elected. The next vote was 124–46 in favour, and by the early 1950s, Cobden had water.

The waterworks system required constant maintenance until a major retooling in the 1980s. The visibly-dominating water tower was built in 1988 replacing the original, which had been built in 1951.

A larger school was needed by 1903. The present-day Cobden District Public School was built in 1938 and initially served as a high school until Opeongo High School was built.

In 2001, the Village of Cobden was amalgamated with the Village of Beachburg, the Township of Ross, and the Township of Westmeath to form the Township of Whitewater Region.

Cobden's location on the busy Trans-Canada Highway, known as Highway 17, makes it a convenient stopping place for drivers passing through the area.

== Demographics ==
In 1991, Cobden had a population of 1026. In 1996, Cobden had a population of 1,020. The population of the town had decreased by 0.58%.

Occupying 1.85 km of land, Cobden has a population density of 551.351 per square kilometre.

== Culture ==
Cobden is hosts its own annual fair, which is held in late August each year. Established in 1854, the Cobden Fair offers several days of activities, which include exhibits, cattle, horse and sheep shows, midway rides and a demolition derby. During the holiday season, it has its own Santa Claus Parade. From May to October, located at the Cobden fairgrounds, it offers fresh local grown produce, homemade baking, and a wide assortment of crafts. It is one of the best farmers' markets in the Ottawa Valley.

=== Farmers' Market ===
Organized in 1991, the Farmers' Market is an outdoor market that runs from May to October. It offers a wide variety of crafts and foodstuffs, and everything must be grown or handmade locally. The market has recently moved from the Memorial Hall grounds to the faigrounds, but the Christmas Market, the grande finale for the year, is still held in the Memorial Hall.

=== Cobden Park ===
Overlooking Muskrat Lake, Cobden Park occupies what is thought to be where Champlain met the Native Chief Nibachis, as a plaque tha twas erected in the 1960s commemorates. The lands for the park were donated by Thomas Robinson and his wife in 1904. In 1988, extensive work was carried out on the beach portion of the park by the Civitans.

=== Bruce McPhail Memorial Airport ===
Home to The Champlain Flying Club, the Cobden airport is on Highway 17 just south of the town.

=== Logos Land ===
Located about 5 miles east of Cobden, Logos Land is a religious based water park. Built on the site of the Astrolabe's discovery, it features five water slides, paddle boats, mini-golf and a representation of Noah's Ark. The water park is open mid-June to Labour Day, but Noah's Ark is open year-round. It is also home to Canada's tallest Christmas tree, standing 22 m . Every year, over 3000 local children decorate the tree, which is dedicated to children around the world.

=== Mussie ===
Mussie is a Nessie-like creature said to reside in Muskrat Lake. It most likely does not exist, or it is more likely a sturgeon. A handmade wooden tribute to Mussie can be found in front of the local Home Hardware Store. Standing 3 m high and approximately 4 m long, it was built by a previous store owner, Doug Schauer.

=== Ottawa Valley Pentecostal Camp ===
Ottawa Valley Pentecostal Camp is a Christian based family and children's camp at the bottom of Muskrat Lake. It has hosted many local community events with its year-round facilities. Members of surrounding churches in the Ottawa area rent out trailers and stay at camp during the summer. The camp is owned and operated by the Pentecostal Assemblies of Canada.

== Notable people ==
- Susie Laska, hockey player for the NWHL
- Robert Wellington Mayhew, the first Canadian ambassador to Japan
- Delbert Lippert, Honorary Colonel, 427 Special Operations Aviation Squadron
- Jack Quinn, National Hockey League Player, drafted 8th overall in the 2020 NHL Draft by the Buffalo Sabres
- Al Ritchie, Canadian football Hall of Famer

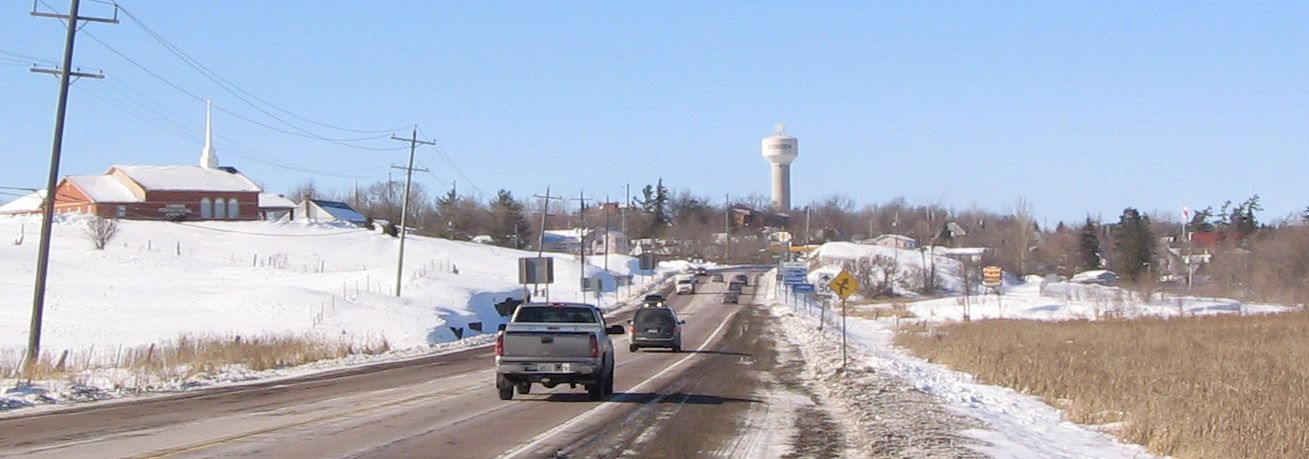
Cobden as seen from the south-east

== Sources ==
- Regional Land Resource Study reis.agr.ca
- History of Township of Ross, Prepared by: Herbert Ross
- The Upper Ottawa Valley Glimpse of History by: Clyde C. Kennedy
- Cobden Then and Now by: George A. Wallace
