= Lake Doré =

Lake in Ontario, Canada

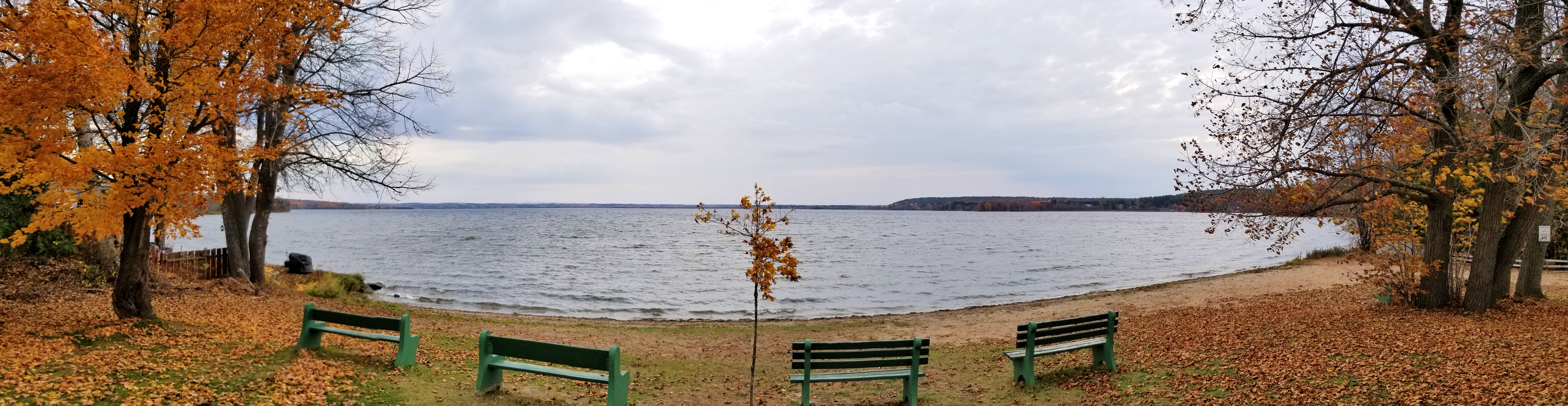

- Location within Ontario
- Location: North Algona-Wilberforce; Renfrew County; Ontario
- Coordinates: 45°37′03″N 77°06′54″W
- Primary inflows: Biedermans Creek; Black Creek; Spring Creek
- Primary outflows: Snake River
- Basin countries: Canada
- Max. length: 8 km (5.0 mi)
- Max. width: 5 km (3.1 mi)
- Max. depth: 18 m (59 ft)
- Surface elevation: 142 m (466 ft)

Lake Doré is a freshwater lake in the township of North Algona-Wilberforce, Renfrew County, Ontario, Canada, about 6 kilometres (3.7 mi) north of the community of Eganville in the neighbouring township of Bonnechere Valley.

== Geography ==
The lake is about 6 kilometres (3.7 mi) long and 3.5 kilometres (2.2 mi) wide, and is only about 18 metres (59 ft) at its deepest. The primary inflows are Black Creek and Spring Creek at the west, and Biedermans Creek at the north. The primary outflow is the Snake River at the northeast, which flows via the Muskrat River into the Ottawa River. There are three named bays, Millers Bay at the south, Smiths Bay at the southwest, and Warrens Bay at the southeast. There are also two named points: Church Point at the southwest and MacDonalds Point at the northwest.

== Settlements ==
The community of Lake Dore is at the northeast tip of the lake at the Snake River outflow. The community of Letts Corners is just to the south.

== Transportation ==
Ontario Highway 41 travels along the south shore of the lake.

== Recreation ==
Lake Dore provides cottagers with ample opportunities for recreational boating and fishing. The lake has a population of Large Mouth Bass and Small Mouth Bass. Northern Pike are also caught by anglers on this lake. There are three boat ramps on the lake.

== Culture ==
Mac Beattie, the first inductee to the Ottawa Valley Country Music Hall of Fame, composed the song "Lake Doré Waltz" in the years after WWII. The song was performed with his band, "Mac Beattie And The Ottawa Valley Melodiers".
