= Mussie =

Monster rumored to live in Muskrat Lake in Ontario, Canada

Creature information
- Grouping: Lake monster
- Sub grouping: Local legend

Origin
- Country: Canada
- Region: Muskrat Lake, Ontario
- Habitat: Water

In Canadian folklore, Mussie is a creature said to live in Muskrat Lake in the Canadian province of Ontario. It is variously described, for example, as a walrus or as a three-eyed Loch Ness Monster-like creature. The legend of Mussie likely began around 1916, though legend claims that Canadian pioneer Samuel de Champlain wrote about it in the early seventeenth century. Mussie has become a part of the local culture and a fixture in the local tourism industry.

== Characteristics ==
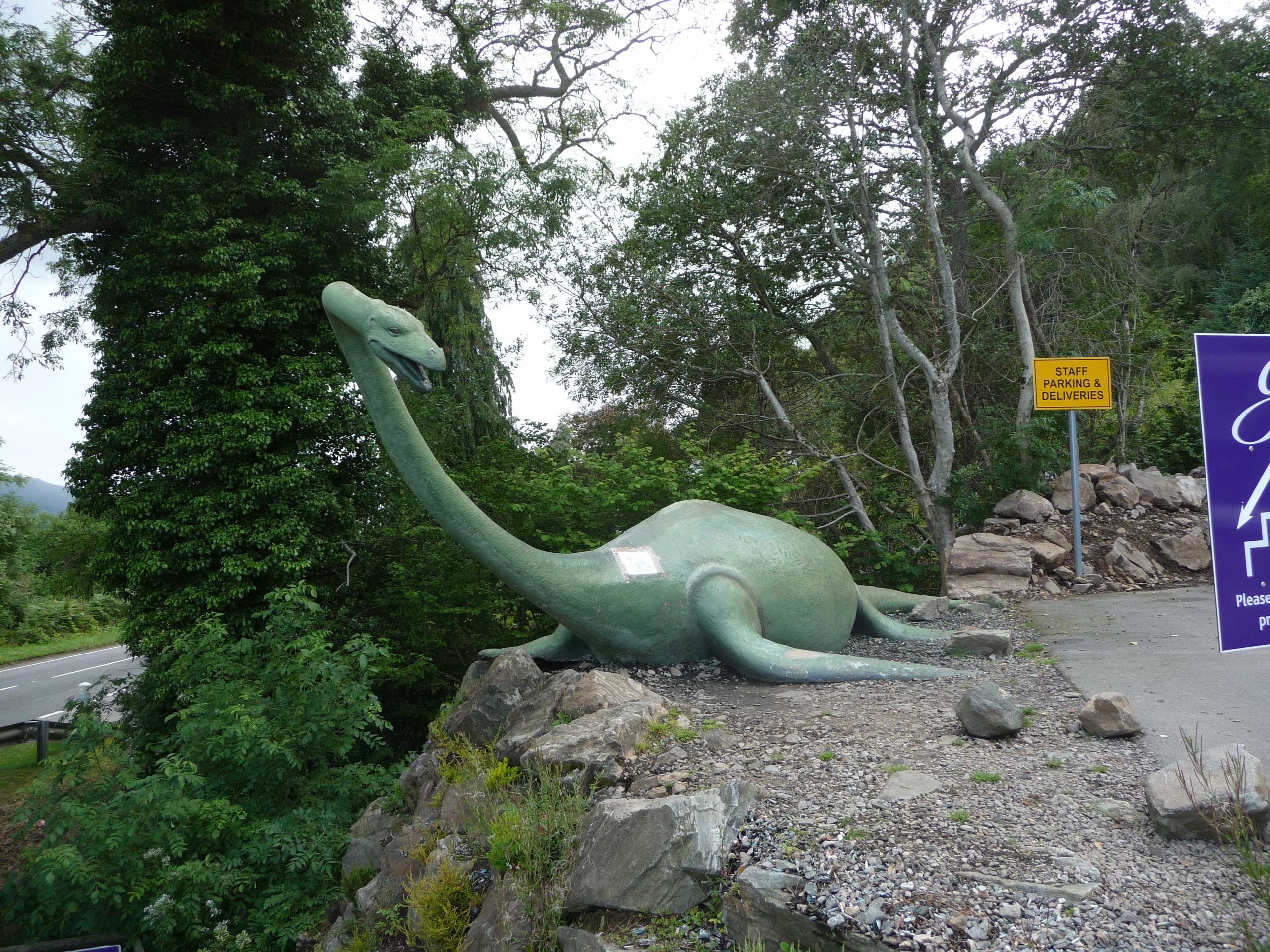
A depiction of the Loch Ness Monster, to which Mussie has been compared

Mussie is a diminutive form of the name of its reported location: Muskrat Lake, a large, deep lake near the village of Cobden, Ontario and about 75 miles northwest of Ottawa. Muskrat Lake is home to another paranormal phenomenon: local legends state that an Atomic Energy of Canada bus driver saw an extraterrestrial spacecraft landing on a spot atop a hill and leaving. There is indeed a dark-colored, circular outline on this hill where grass does not grow, with no widely accepted cause.

There is no single accepted portrayal of Mussie's age, its gender, or even whether it is a single, long-lived creature or a species. Some residents claim that a single, very old Mussie—or a member of its species—first arrived in the area, then covered by the ocean, about 10,000 years ago. In this tale, glaciers and, later, solid landmasses built up around it, forming the lake, and Mussie was trapped. Mussie's diet, according to self-proclaimed observer Donnie Humphries, consists at least partially of cattails found near the edge of the lake.

Descriptions of Mussie's physical appearance are inconsistent. In local folklore, it has variously been portrayed as akin to a walrus; a sturgeon or other fish; or similar to the Loch Ness Monster, but with three eyes and sharper teeth. Another oft-cited description from local historian James F. Robison is as follows:

It is described as having three eyes, three ears, one big fin halfway down its back, two legs, [and] one big tooth in front, is silvery-green in colour, and stretches for twenty-four feet.

== History ==
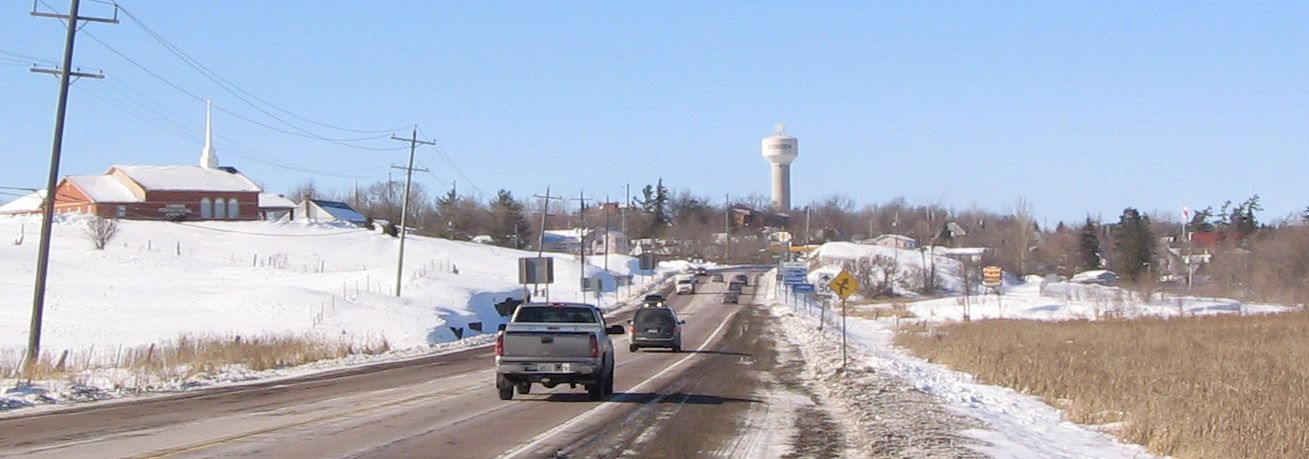
Cobden, Ontario, during the winter

The presence of a large, unusual creature in Muskrat Lake has been the subject of anecdotes since 1916. The creature's name was originally cited as Hapyxelor, alternately spelled Hapaxelor, but changed simply to Mussie, short for The Monster of Muskrat Lake, sometime later. Humphries, a man from Cobden, was a well-known proponent of Mussie's existence. Around the area, many people's knowledge of the creature come from his vehement, albeit inconsistent, tales of observing it once.

Some residents claim that, independent of the truth of the Mussie legend, the legend's origins are older: supposedly, French explorer and settler Samuel de Champlain wrote of the creature's existence in the early seventeenth century. However, no concrete evidence of such writings has been uncovered, even though Champlain did write of loud screams from sea monsters living in the Grand Banks of Newfoundland.

Author Michael Bradley and friend Deanna Theilmann-Beann searched for Mussie in the Nepenthe, a boat with sonar technology. With their sonar, they found two creatures they hypothesized could be two marine mammals, three metres long. Bradley concluded that at least one creature compatible with Mussie's description lived in the lake, though he did not investigate the creatures further. Scientists have also surveyed the area and found nothing, though the definitive nonexistence of a Mussie-like creature is difficult to establish because some of the trenches in Muskrat Lake extend to over 60 metres.

== In culture ==
Mussie has become a cultural mascot of the area, appearing on signs welcoming visitors to Cobden and in front of the Home Hardware store in the village. It is not usually portrayed as fearsome; it is given seasonal accessories to mark holidays, like a Santa Claus hat for Christmas. The creature's economic value through the tourism industry has caused it to be described as "recession-fighting" in local folk songs.

Every year, visitors in the Muskrat Lake area search for Mussie in the lake. So far, none have yet captured conclusive evidence of its existence. In the 1990s, a tourism marketing campaign for the area offered CAN$1 million to anyone who could capture a live specimen, but no one did. Mussie is referenced in travel pamphlets for the Whitewater Region area; one such pamphlet suggests that it can be caught by a fishing rod.

== See also ==
- Cressie
- Igopogo
- Ogopogo
- Loch Ness Monster
- List of lake monsters
