= Haley Industries =

Canadian manufacturing company

Haley Industries is a Canadian company that manufactures lightweight metal castings for use in aerospace applications. It was a prime contributor to the Avro Arrow aircraft project.

== Origins ==
Haley Industries (originally known as Light Alloys Limited) was founded in 1952 in Haley Station, Ontario (approximately 100 km west of Canada's capital city Ottawa). It was set up with the support of the Canadian government in order to contribute to the development of Canada's fledgling aerospace industry. The site chosen was close to the Dominion Magnesium smelter, a producer of magnesium metal using the Pidgeon process which was pioneered there.

== Involvement with the Avro Arrow ==
In 1953 Canada decided to design and build a supersonic interceptor aircraft to be known as the Avro (CF-105) Arrow. The aircraft was to be built by Avro Canada and to achieve speeds up to Mach 2. In order to achieve this, use was to be made of magnesium and titanium metals to save weight. The aircraft first flew in 1958, but delays, rising costs and a change of government led to the programme's cancellation in 1959.

== Subsequent history ==
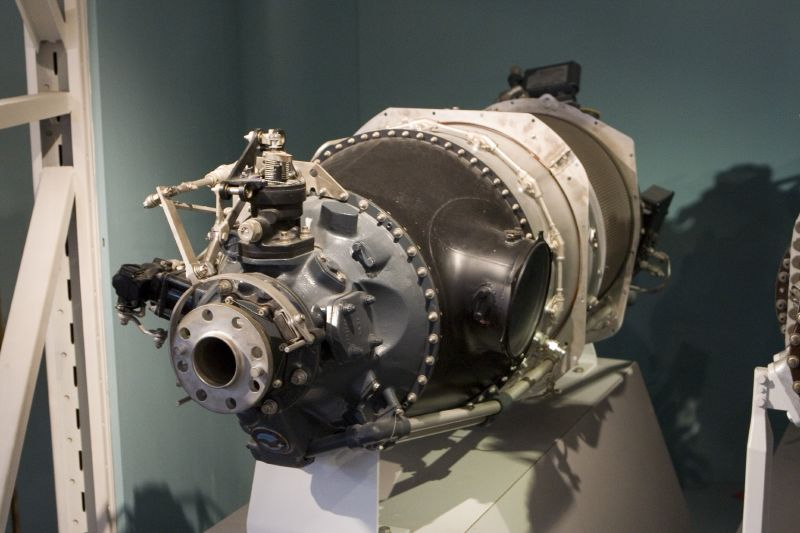
A Pratt and Whitney aero engine including Haley components.

The 10 years following the cancellation of the Arrow were difficult, and the company had to diversify into the commercial market. It was privatized in 1967, and in 1981, it was listed on the Toronto Stock Exchange. In 1984 it purchased the Presto Casting Company of Phoenix, Arizona. Haley and Presto are now owned by the Magellan Aerospace Corporation, and continues to make lightweight castings for air, space and specialized engineering applications. As of 2007, the company employed 391 full and part-time employees and is still located in Haley Station.

In 2004, the company was named as one of Ontario's three worst water polluters by the Sierra Legal Defence Fund. Their report was based on violations occurring in 2001, when Haley recorded 82 water pollution violations.
