= Astrolabe Lake =

Lake in Ontario, Canada

- Location within Ontario
- Location: Whitewater Region; Renfrew County; Ontario
- Coordinates: 45°36′11″N 76°50′03″W
- Primary outflows: Buttermilk Creek
- Basin countries: Canada
- Surface elevation: 148 m (486 ft)

Astrolabe Lake (formerly Green Lake) is a lake in the township of Whitewater Region, Renfrew County, Ontario, Canada. Astrolabe Lake is where, in 1867, Edward Lee, a local farmboy, found Samuel Champlain's long lost astrolabe; a plaque now stands near the lake to commemorate this. The lake is a meeting point for the back end of both the local golf course, Oakes of Cobden, and the Splash Valley waterpark. It drains via Buttermilk Creek and the Muskrat River into the Ottawa River.
