= Muskrat River (Ontario) =

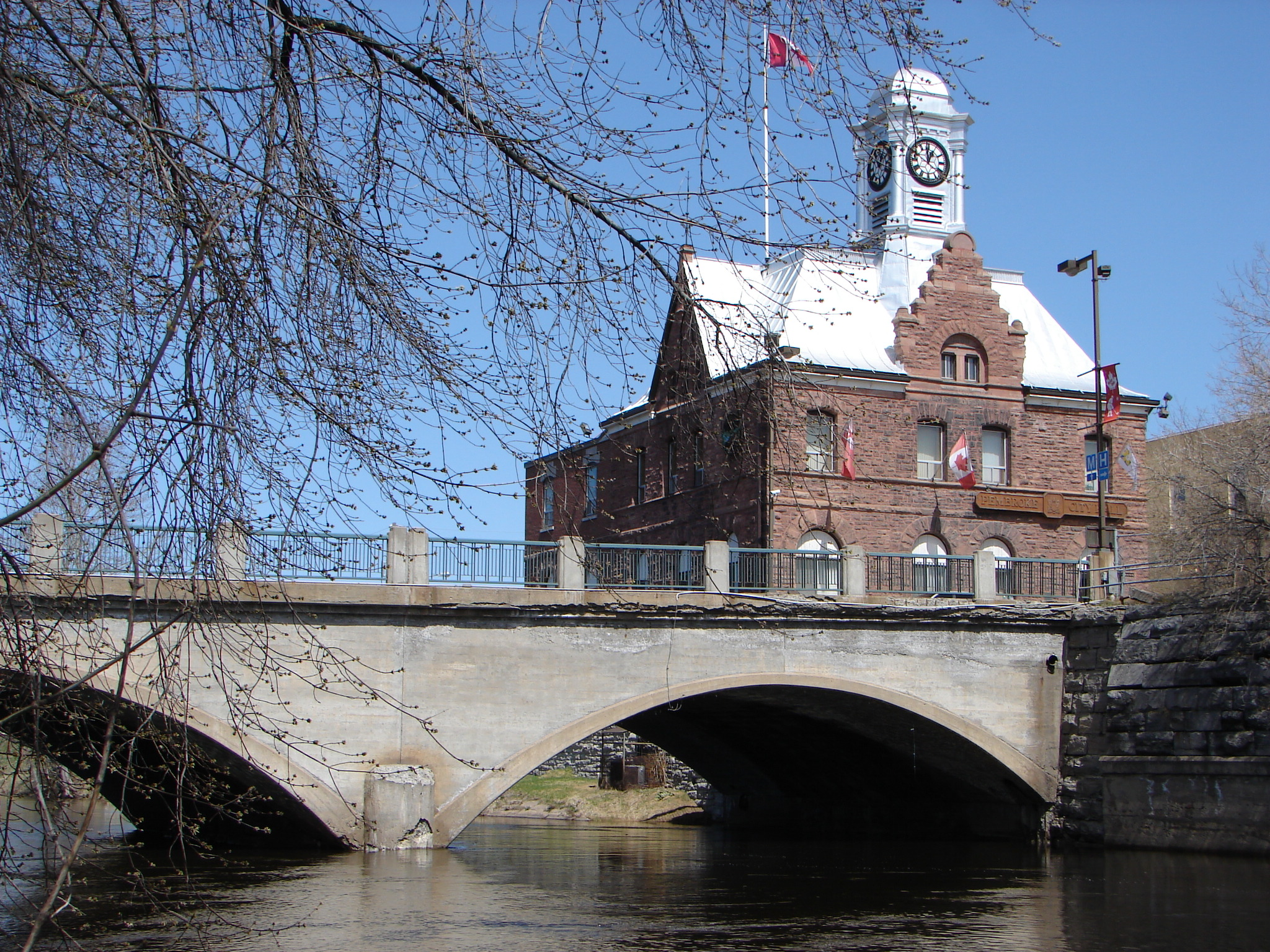
- The Muskrat River at Pembroke, Ontario

- Location of the mouth of the Muskrat River in Ontario

Location
- Country: Canada
- Province: Ontario
- County: Renfrew
- Municipalities: Pembroke; Whitewater Region (township)

Physical characteristics
- Source: Edmunds Lake
  - location: Township of Whitewater Region
  - coordinates: 45°33′48″N 76°43′58″W
  - elevation: 164 m (538 ft)
- Mouth: Ottawa River
  - location: Pembroke
  - coordinates: 45°49′45″N 77°06′49″W
  - elevation: 110 m (360 ft)

Basin features
- Tributaries
  - left: Indian River, Mud Creek, Snake River
  - right: Buttermilk Creek

The Muskrat River is a river in Renfrew County, Ontario, Canada that flows into the Ottawa River at the city of Pembroke.

== Course ==
The river begins at Edmunds Lake, one of the Champlain Trail Lakes and near the community of Garden of Eden, and heads northwest through other Champlain Trail lakes to reach the largest, Jeffrys Lake. It continues northwest, loops under Ontario Highway 17, and takes in the right tributary Buttermilk Creek just before reaching Muskrat Lake at the community of Cobden. There, the left tributary Snake River joins. The river exits the lake near the community of Meath Hill, and continues northwest, looping west and east again under Ontario Highway 17 while taking the left tributary Mud Creek at Mud Lake, and then takes in the left tributary Indian River before reaching its mouth at the Ottawa River at Pembroke.

== Economy ==
The river once provided hydroelectric power for Pembroke.

== Ecology ==
In the fall, thousands of swallows gather at the mouth of this river before continuing their migration south.

== Tributaries ==
- Indian River (left)
- Mud Creek (left)
- Snake River (left)
- Buttermilk Creek (right)

== See also ==
- List of rivers of Ontario
