= Opeongo High School =

Location
- 1990 Cobden Road; Douglas, Ontario, K0J 1S0; Canada; 45.56321°N 76.99068°W

Information
- School type: Public Secondary
- Founded: 1968
- School board: Renfrew County District School Board
- Principal: Dean Zadow
- Grades: 9 to 12
- Language: English
- Area: Renfrew County
- Colours: Green and Gold
- Mascot: Wildcat
- Website: ohs.rcdsb.on.ca/en/

Opeongo High School is a secondary school in Renfrew County, Ontario, Canada, that serves the townships of Whitewater Region, Laurentian Valley, Admaston Bromley, Sebastapol, Bonnechere Valley, and North Algona-Wilberforce. School serves students from Eganville, Cobden and Douglas area. It was built in 1968, at a cost of $3.6 million, to accommodate a growing population of students and a change in educational trends. It has a student population of between 400 and 500 students. Its colours are green and gold, and its mascot is the Wildcat.

== Notable alumni ==
- Kevin Gillis — creator of cartoon series The Raccoons
- Jesse Hutch — actor
- Melissa Bishop — Olympic athlete (800m track)

== See also ==
- Education in Ontario
- List of secondary schools in Ontario
