= Champlain Trail Lakes =

Group of lakes in Ontario, Canada

The Champlain Trail Lakes are a group of lakes on the southern point of Whitewater Region in Ontario, Canada. They lie in more or less a straight line and are named for the fact that explorer Samuel de Champlain used them to portage around the Chenaux Rapids while exploring the Ottawa River. Coldingham, Catharine and Garden Lake all drain into Browns Bay. The rest of the lakes drain into the Muskrat River which flows through each successively.

The Champlain Trail Lakes include:

- Coldingham Lake
- Catharine Lake
- Garden Lake
- Edmunds Lake
- Blanchards Lake
- Smiths Lake
- Lake Galilee
- Dump Lake
- Eadys Lake
- Pumphouse Lake
- Olmstead-Jeffrey Lake
