= Susie Laska =

Canadian ice hockey player

Susie Laska (born November 1, 1979, in Cobden, Ontario) is an ice hockey player formerly with the now-defunct Ottawa Senators of the CWHL.

== Early life and education ==
A native of Cobden, Ontario, Laska grew up playing hockey in the Ottawa Valley.

== Playing career ==
Laska played her university hockey with the University of Toronto Blues from 1998 to 2003. While at university, she was a member of the Canada national women's under-22 hockey team.

She won a CIS championship in 2001 and served as the team captain in 2002-03.

She went on to join the Ottawa Raiders and was the team captain. She helped the Ottawa Raiders win an NWHL East Division title in 2005-06.

At the international level, Laska represented Canada's U-22 hockey team in 2000-01.
