= Muskrat Lake =

Lake in Ontario, Canada

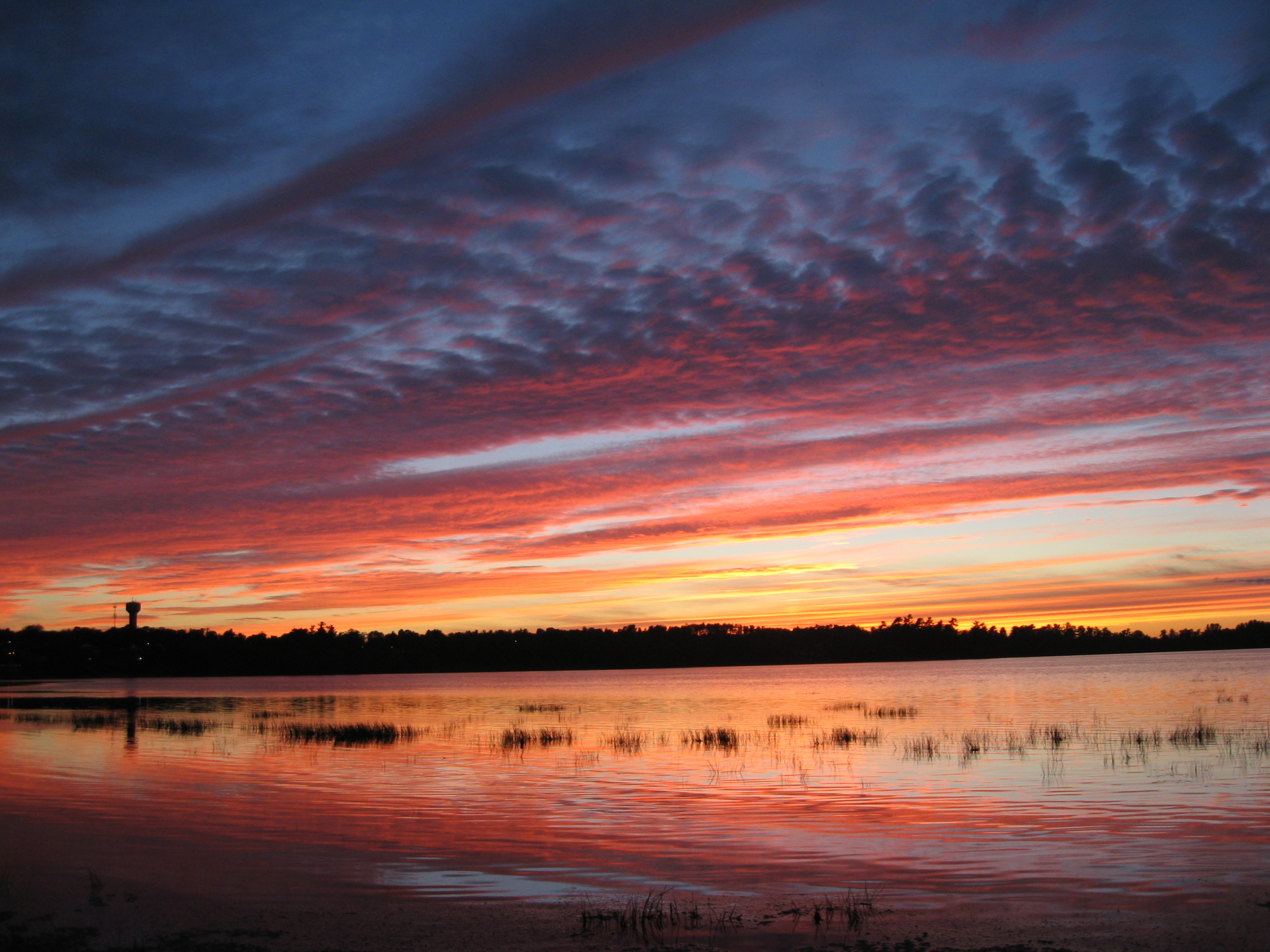

- Location within Ontario

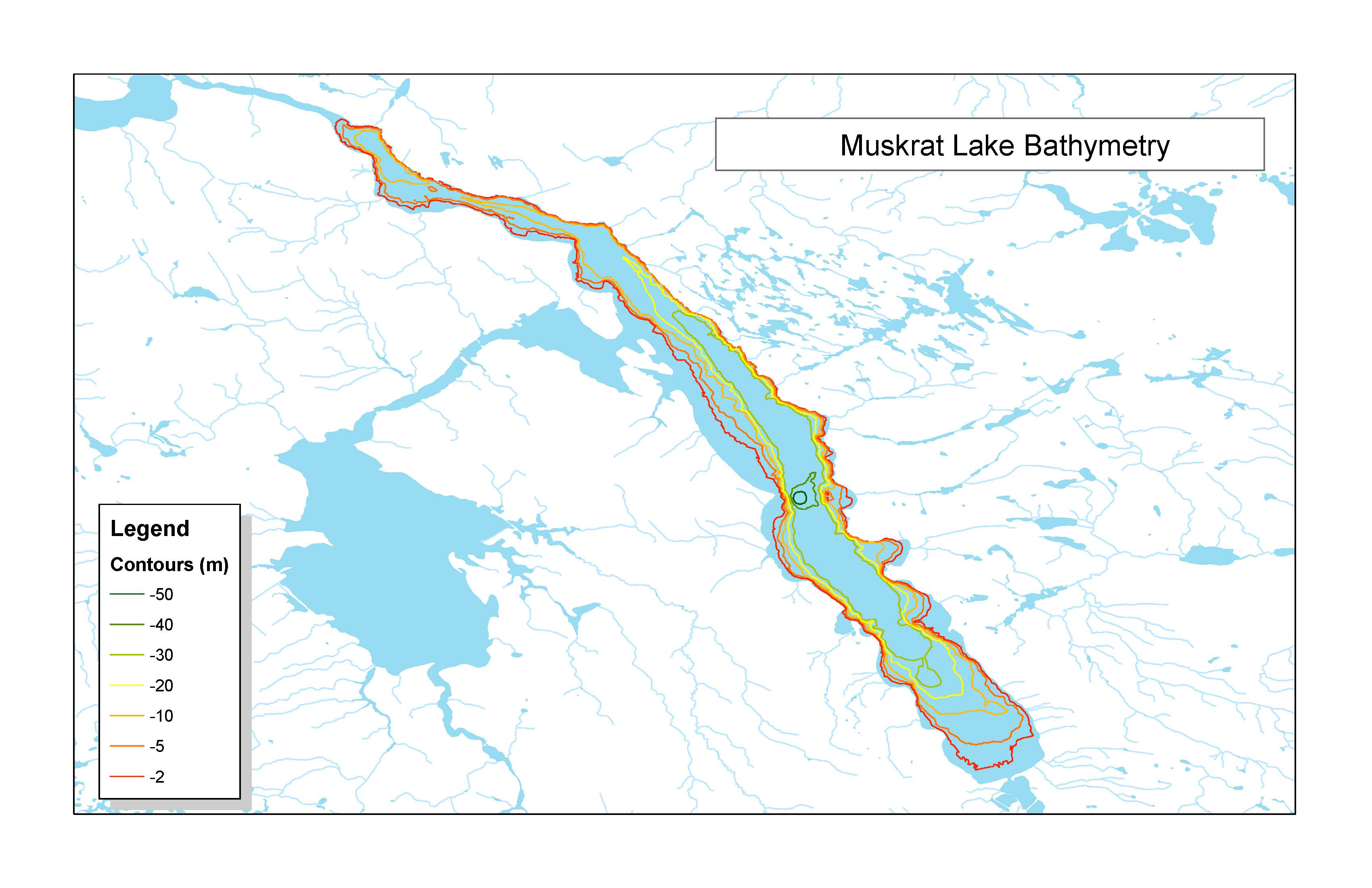
- Map of Depths in Muskrat Lake Provided by the Muskrat Watershed Council
- Location: Whitewater Region, Ontario, Canada
- Coordinates: 45.678°N 76.908°W
- Primary inflows: Muskrat River and Buttermilk Creek at Forester Falls Road
- Primary outflows: Muskrat River at Highway 17
- Basin countries: Canada
- Max. length: 16 km (9.9 mi)
- Surface area: 1,219 ha (3,010 acres)
- Average depth: 17.9 m (59 ft)
- Max. depth: 64 m (210 ft)
- Islands: 1
- Settlements: Cobden, Ontario

Muskrat Lake is located in the Whitewater Region of Renfrew County, in Ontario, Canada. It is approximately 16 km (9.9 mi) in length, an average of 17.9 m (59 ft) deep but 64 m (210 ft) at its deepest point, and covers an area of 1,219 ha (3,010 acres). It is rumored to be home to a legendary lake monster that locals fondly refer to as “Mussie”. The lake currently has over 300 lakefront properties and two privately owned campgrounds surrounding its shores. The town of Cobden is the largest settlement on the lake, with a population slightly over 1,000 people.

== Geology ==
Like many other lakes in the Ottawa Valley, Muskrat Lake was formed roughly 10,000 years ago when the glaciers of the last ice age receded. At that point it was part of the much larger Champlain Sea. About 6,000 years ago, water levels dropped and the Champlain Sea receded, leaving behind what we know presently as Muskrat Lake and its surrounding tributaries.

Three major tributaries contribute to the inflow of water into Muskrat Lake. These include the Muskrat River and Buttermilk Creek from the east and the Snake River from the south. Muskrat Lake drains into Muskrat River (at the western point of the lake) where it continues north towards Pembroke, Ontario and drains into the Ottawa River.

== History ==
=== Samuel de Champlain 1613 Expedition ===
The Muskrat Lake region was originally inhabited by the Algonquin people. The first European explorer to discover Muskrat Lake and its surrounding area was Samuel de Champlain on June 7, 1613. At the time, Champlain was exploring the possibility of an alternative route to the Northern Sea (Hudson Bay) that would bypass the treacherous rapids along the Ottawa River. During his expedition in 1613, Champlain came upon a group of Algonquins led by Nibachis, close to the shores of a lake that Champlain named Lac De Nibachis (now modern day Muskrat Lake). After supplying Champlain with guides, Nibachis sent Champlain and his men seven leagues down the lake by canoe. According to Champlain's records, the adventurers then portaged one league to modern day Lower Allumette Lake to meet with Chief Tessoὒat on what historians conclude to be Morrison Island.

=== The Astrolabe ===
During his 1613 expedition from the Ottawa River to the North Sea, Champlain lost his astrolabe. More than 200 years later in 1867, the astrolabe was discovered by a 15-year-old boy named Edward G. Lee who was helping his father clear land on lot 13, concession 2, Ross Township. Currently, a local resort called Logos Land, just east of Cobden, is situated on part of this land. In 1943, the astrolabe was acquired by the New York Historian Society and later returned to Canada when purchased by the Canadian Government in 1989 for $250,000. The astrolabe is currently displayed at the Museum of Civilization in Ottawa. A stone monument commemorating the discovery was erected near Logos Land in 1952.

=== Ferries and Forwarding Services on Muskrat Lake ===
In 1837, explorer David Thompson set out to mark a route for a proposed canal from the Ottawa River to Georgian Bay. The canal was to travel up Muskrat River and through Muskrat Lake, but never materialized. Thwarted by lack of supplies, Thompson never completed his survey.

In 1848, Jason Gould (1802-1864) decided to create a forwarding line from Portage Du Fort on the Ottawa River to Pembroke, Ontario. This route included a ferrying service across Muskrat Lake and up part of the Muskrat River to Jackson's Grove, just outside of Pembroke. This route was considered shorter with more favorable terrain than the route currently being taken along the Ottawa River.

The original ferries were flat-bottomed row boats that required the passengers to paddle them. Muskrat Lake's first steamboat, The Muskrat, was created to meet the growing demand for simpler transportation across the lake and was soon accompanied by the North Star in the spring of 1853. The North Star was reported to be over 90 feet in length and able to “…float on heavy dew”.

On May 16, 1853, a great forest fire burned from Pembroke to Horton, Ontario. Smoke from the fire was reported to cause discomfort to residents as far as Bytown and Perth. The fire consumed almost everything in its path, including Jason Gould's wharf on Muskrat Lake, his storehouses, and The Muskrat. The North Star managed to survive the fire on the happenstance that it was out on the water returning from a trip to Pembroke that morning. In 1860, Jason Gould sold his business to the Union Forwarding Co. which was principally owned by Daniel Crowley (the former captain of the North Star). In 1863, Crowley built a new ferry and named it the Jason Gould. The ferrying service on Muskrat Lake came to an end with the arrival of the railroad in Cobden during 1876.

In 1965, two scuba divers, Kim Charlebois, 28, and Jack Tremblay, 26, from the Underwater Society of Ottawa came across the burnt remains of the ferry The Muskrat a few feet off the shores of Muskrat Lake. The scuba divers were reported to bring up pieces of timber, iron fittings and a number of bottles, two of them still corked.

=== Community Involvement on the Lake ===
From its original inhabitants, the Algonquins, to the arrival of European settlers, Muskrat Lake has proven to be an important resource for its surrounding inhabitants. In 1865, children attending Cobden's Elementary School would skate or travel by row boat across Muskrat Lake each day to get to school. Cobden's Women's Institute held a picnic on the shores of Muskrat Lake in 1912 featuring a steamboat ferry ride across the lake. In the same year, local resident, Peter Pappin caught a 65 lb lake sturgeon on Muskrat Lake. In September 1961, Premier Frost arrived via float plane on Muskrat Lake to officially open the reconstructed Cobden Memorial Hall. To date there has been only two people recorded to have made the swim across Muskrat Lake, Lawrence Dack in June, 1923, and Sarah Hall on June 17, 2017. Since 2010, The Cobden Civitan Club has used the lake every winter to host the Cobden Ice Fishing Derby on Muskrat Lake. On February 1, 2020, the derby saw over 1,500 participants.

== Ecosystem ==
Muskrat Lake is home to a diverse terrestrial and aquatic ecosystem. Muskrat Lake is popular year round among bird watchers, outdoor enthusiast, anglers, and duck hunters. Each year the lake hosts multiple fishing derbies. The lake itself is known for its large array of fresh water fish species, such as lake sturgeon, walleye, lake trout, pike, bass, catfish and longnose gar. The municipal dock, located at the east end of the lake, is a regular meeting spot for bird watchers who have caught sight of Franklin's gull among other birds.

== Environment Issues ==
=== Nutrient loading ===
Over the past several decades Muskrat Lake has seen a serious and significant decline in water quality, most specifically related to nutrient loading.

Declining water quality on Muskrat Lake has resulted in negative impacts on shoreline property owners, recreational users, residential development, the tourism industry, fish species and aquatic habitat, and has generated public health concerns related to blue-green algae. It has been speculated the excess Eutrophication could have been caused by poor or leaking Septic tank management from the multiple Campsites located around Muskrat Lake.

=== Blue-green algae ===
One of the more serious side effects of nutrient loading in Muskrat Lake is the proliferation of blue-green algae (cyanobacteria) blooms. As blue-green algae blooms decay they release toxins into the surrounding freshwater environment, which can be harmful to humans, pets, livestock, fish, and other wildlife. Muskrat Lake has seen an increase in the frequency and severity of blue-green algae blooms in recent years. From 2007 to 2013 blue-green algae blooms were confirmed three times by the Ministry of Environment, Conservation, and Parks.
