= Sharbot Lake (Ontario) =

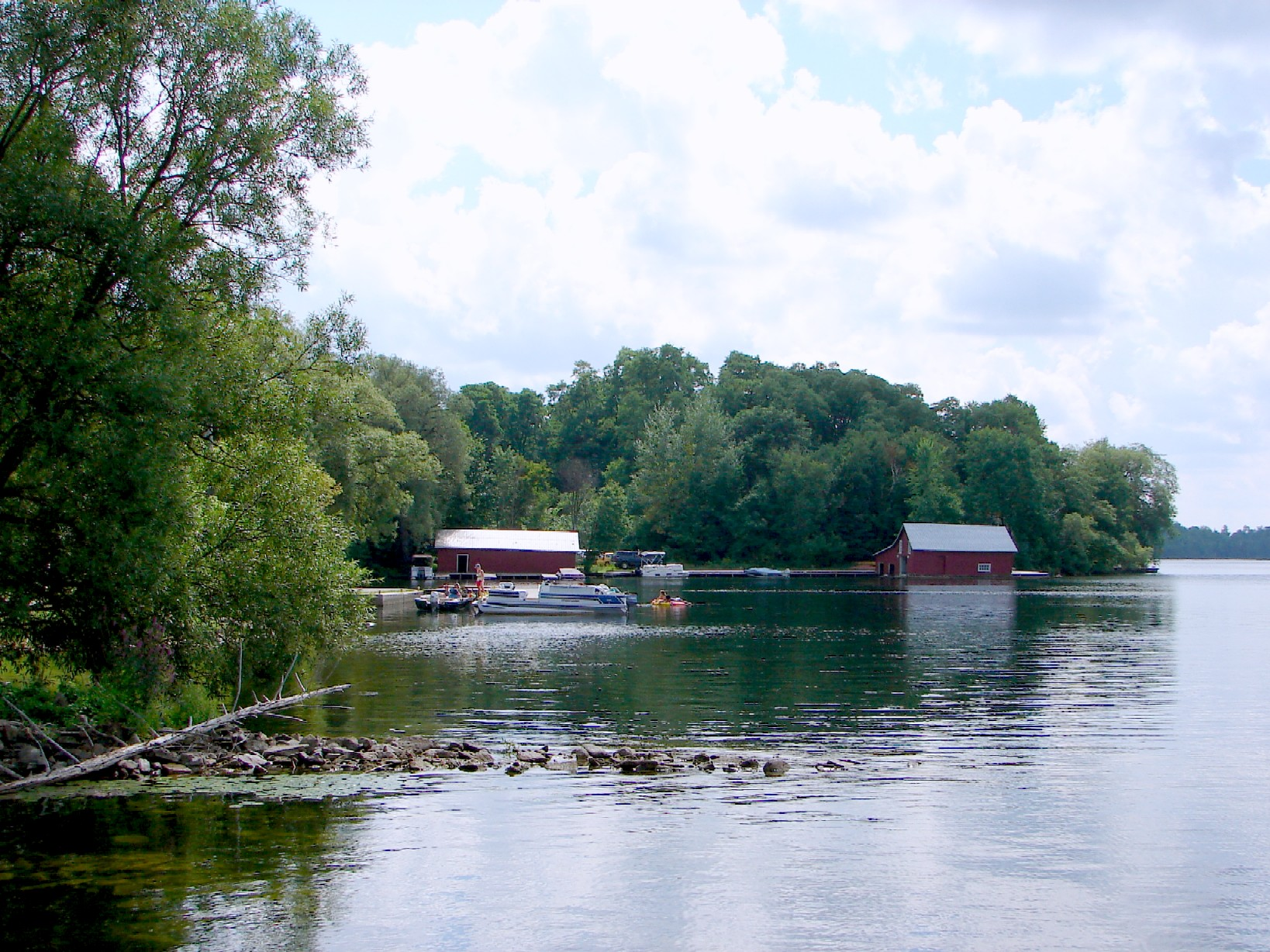

- Location in Southern Ontario
- Location: Frontenac County, Ontario
- Coordinates: 44°46′03″N 76°41′36″W
- Type: Lake
- Part of: Saint Lawrence River drainage basin
- Primary outflows: Fall River
- Basin countries: Canada
- Max. length: 9.5 kilometres (5.9 mi)
- Max. width: 5 kilometres (3.1 mi)
- Surface elevation: 195 metres (640 ft)
- Settlements: Sharbot Lake

Sharbot Lake is a lake in the municipality of Central Frontenac, Frontenac County in Eastern Ontario, Canada. It is part of the Saint Lawrence River drainage basin. The eponymous community of Sharbot Lake is located at the centre of the north shore of the lake.

The primary outflow, at the northeast, is the Fall River, which flows via the Mississippi River and the Ottawa River to the Saint Lawrence River.

Sharbot Lake Provincial Park is named for, and is partly on the northwest shore of, the lake, but mostly envelops the neighbouring Black Lake. Ontario Highway 7 runs roughly along the northwest side of the lake, and the former Ontario Highway 38, now County Road 38, crosses the lake at the location of the community of Sharbot Lake. The same crossing point is used by the multi-use K&P Rail Trail (part of the Trans Canada Trail), formerly the rail bed of the Kingston and Pembroke Railway. Sharbot Lake is named after a First Nations Chief named Francis Chabot, who was Mohawk and his wife Algonquin.

== Tributaries ==
Clockwise from the Fall River outflow

- Sucker Harbour Creek
- Sharbot Creek

== See also ==
- List of lakes in Ontario
