= List of trails in Canada =

This is a list of all rail trails and major long-distance hiking and cycling routes in Canada.

== National ==
- Trans Canada Trail
- Great Divide Trail

== Alberta ==
- Iron Horse Trail, Alberta

== British Columbia ==
- Alexander MacKenzie Heritage Trail
- Centennial Trail
- Columbia & Western Rail Trail
- Cowichan Valley Trail
- Galloping Goose Regional Trail
- Interurban Rail Trail
- Kettle Valley Rail Trail
- Kludahk Trail
- Lochside Regional Trail
- Okanagan Rail Trail
- Slocan Valley Rail-Trail
- Vancouver Island Spine Trail
- West Coast Trail

== New Brunswick ==
- Dobson Trail
- Riverfront Trail
- Sentier NB Trail

== Newfoundland ==
- Newfoundland T'Railway

== Nova Scotia ==
- Atlantic View Trail
- Back Harbour Trail
- Barrington Bay Trail
- Beechville-Lakeside-Timberlea Trail
- Blueberry Run Trail
- Bridgewater Centennial Trail
- Chain of Lakes Multipurpose Trail
- Cobequid Trail
- Crowbar Lake Hiking Trails
- Gaetz Brook Greenway
- Jitney Trail
- Jordan Falls Community Trail
- Judique Flyer Recreational Nature Trail
- Kentville Rail Trail
- Lunenburg Front Harbour Walk
- Musquodoboit Trailway
- Old Guysborough Line
- Oyster Pond Trail
- Salt Marsh Trail
- Shearwater Flyer Trail
- Shelburne Rail Trail
- Ship Railway
- St. Margarets Bay Trail
- Trestle Trail

== Ontario ==
- Hamilton-Brantford-Cambridge Trails
- New York Central Recreational Trail, Embrun–Russell
- Riverfront Trail, Windsor, uses some former CN rail lines' right-of-way along the Detroit River
- West Toronto Railpath, Toronto
- Beltline Trail, Toronto

Trail name	Length in km (mi)	Western/northern terminus	Eastern/southern terminus	Communities served	Notes
Ausable Trail	4.7 km (2.9 mi)	Arkona	Thedford	Arkona, Thedford	hiking trail
Avon Trail	121 km (75 mi)	Thamesville Trail in St. Marys	Grand Valley Trail in Conestogo	St. Marys, Stratford, Waterloo, Conestogo	hiking trail, provides connection from London to Grand Valley Trail in the Waterloo area
Beltline Trail	9 km (6 mi)	Toronto	Toronto	Toronto	Urban rail trail on the right of way of the former Toronto Belt Line Railway.
Bruce Trail	820 km?	Niagara Recreational Trail at Queenston	Tobermory	Queenston, Niagara Falls, Thorold, Hamilton, Palgrave, Creemore, Owen Sound, Wiarton, Tobermory	bicycles are not allowed on trail; among the longest hiking-only trails in Ontario
Caledon Trailway	35 km (22 mi)	Terra Cotta	Humber Valley Trail in Palgrave	Cheltenham, Inglewood, Palgrave	biking trail; has a newly created overpass over Highway 10 near Sligo Hill, carries Bruce Trail from Inglewood to Palgrave; connected to Elora-Cataract Trail via Bruce Trail and Trans-Canada Trail
Cambridge-Paris Trail	19 km	Galt (in Cambridge)	SC Johnson Trail in Paris	Galt, Paris	biking trail, provides connection from Hamilton to Cambridge via Brantford and Paris
Cataraqui Trail	104 km (65 mi)	Newburgh	Smiths Falls	Newburgh, Harrowsmith, Smiths Falls	former CP Rail line
Chedoke Radial Trail	2.7 km (1.7 mi)	Hamilton	Hamilton	Hamilton	Part of the Bruce Trail. Follows a part of the right of way of the Brantford and Hamilton Electric Railway.
Chrysler Canada Greenway	42 km (25 mi)	Windsor, Ontario	Ruthven, Ontario	Windsor, Ontario, Essex, Ontario, McGregor, Harrow, Kingsville, Ruthven	bicycle-friendly trail; extensions are planned
Don Mills Trail	3 km (1.9 mi)	Toronto	Toronto	Don Mills	Rail trail
Elgin Trail		Thames Valley Trail at Talbotville Royal	Port Stanley	Port Stanley, St. Thomas, Talbotville Royal	connects to Thamesville Trail
Elora-Cataract Trail	47 km	Grand Valley Trail at Elora	Trans-Canada Trail at Cataract	Elora, Fergus, Elmira, Hillsburgh, Erin	
Feeder Canal Trail		North of Lowbanks	Welland	Welland	connects to Welland municipal trail network (Welland Canal Parkway East Side Trail) along Welland Recreational Waterway
Friendship Trail	24 km	Port Colborne	Niagara Recreational Trail at Fort Erie, Ontario	Port Colborne, Fort Erie	provides continuous link from Port Colborne to Trenton, via Fort Erie, Niagara-on-the-Lake (Niagara Recreational Trail), Hamilton, Toronto, and Port Hope (Waterfront Trail)
G2G Rail Trail	127 km (79 mi)	Goderich	Guelph	Guelph, Ariss, West Montrose, Elmira, Wallenstein, Linwood, Millbank, Milverton, Monkton, Walton, Goderich	Rail trail composed of three major segments: the Kissing Bridge Trailway at the far east end, the Perth Harvest Pathway in the middle, and the Lake Huron Route in the west.
Ganaraska Hiking Trail	500 km (310 mi)	Victoria Rail Trail at Feir Mill	Waterfront Trail at Port Hope	Port Hope, Omemee	hiking trail, connected to other Ganaraska Hiking Trail segments via Victoria Rail Trail
Ganaraska Hiking Trail, Midland Section		Highway 12 at Old Fort/Midland	Victoria Rail Trail north of Burnt River	Midland, Orillia, Kawartha Lakes	hiking trail
Ganaraska Hiking Trail, Wasaga Section		Tiny Trail at Wyevale	Ganaraska Hiking Trail, Midland Section at Copeland Forest Resources Management Area near Martinville	Wasaga Beach, Creemore, Angus, Midhurst	giant loop hiking trail, has a 5-km spur linking it to Bruce Trail
Georgian Bluffs Trail	16 km (9.9 mi)	Park Head	Bruce Trail at Benallen, Ontario	Park Head, Benallen	bicycle-friendly trail
Georgian Trail	34 km (21 mi)	Meaford	Collingwood	Meaford, Thornbury, Collingwood	connects to Collingwood municipal trail network
Goderich-Auburn Trail		Goderich	Auburn	Goderich, Auburn	bicycle-friendly trail
Gordon Glaves Memorial Pathway		Cambridge-Paris Trail at Paris	Hamilton-Brantford Rail Trail at Brantford	Brantford	entirely urban bike trail constructed by the City of Brantford as a link between the SC Johnson Trail and the Hamilton-Brantford Rail Trail
Grand Valley Trail	275.3 km (171.1 mi)	Alton	Port Maitland (East)	Dunnville, Cayuga, Caledonia, Brantford, Paris, Cambridge, Kitchener, Waterloo, Elora, Fergus, Elmira, Alton	very long hiking trail; biking segments are concurrent with Gordon Glaves Memorial Pathway, SC Johnson Trail, Cambridge-Paris Trail, and Elora-Cataract Trail
Grey County CP Rail Trail		Owen Sound	Dundalk, Ontario	Dundalk, Flesherton, Markdale, Chatsworth, Owen Sound	former CP Rail line, bicycle-friendly trail
Haliburton County Rail Trail	35 km (22 mi)	Victoria Rail Trail at Kinmount	Haliburton	Haliburton	long cycling trail; combined with its extension (Victoria Rail Trail), the total distance from one end to the other is 89 km; former CP line, abandoned in 1981
Hamilton-Brantford Rail Trail	32 km	Gordon Glaves Memorial Pathway in Brantford	Hamilton, Ontario	Brantford, Hamilton	longest of the Cambridge-Brantford-Hamilton Trail network
Howard Watson Trail		Sarnia	Camlachie	Sarnia, Brights Grove, Errol, Camlachie	bicycle-friendly trail
Humber Valley Trail		Palgrave	Bolton	Palgrave, Cedar Mills, Bolton	hiking trail, connects to Bruce Trail and Caledon Trailway
Iron Horse Trail	5.5 km (3.4 mi)	Uptown Waterloo	Kitchener	Kitchener and Waterloo	Urban rail trail between the two adjacent cities.
Kissing Bridge Trailway	44 km (27 mi)	Millbank	Guelph	Guelph, Ariss, West Montrose, Elmira, Wallenstein, Linwood, Millbank	The trail surface is stone chip for much of the trailway. Because the trailway runs along former rail lands, it is largely flat and even and is well-suited for a number of uses: hiking, running, cycling, cross-country skiing, snowshoeing. Snowmobiling is permitted certain sections, otherwise no motorized vehicles or horses. It is a part of the G2G Rail Trail.
K&P Rail Trail	40 km	Central Frontenac Trail at Sharbot Lake	Renfrew	Snow Road Station	very remote, has nearby swamps, bike trail serves as a driveway to residences in remote areas
La Cloche Silhouette Trail	78 km (48 mi)	Killarney Provincial Park	Killarney Provincial Park	(Wilderness trail)	Steep grades
Lang-Hastings Trail	33 km	Peterborough	Hastings	Peterborough, Assumption, Keene, Hastings	Multi-use trail that is a section of the Trans-Canada Trail. Mostly flat with a crushed limestone surface.
Lynn Valley Trail	11.8 km (7.3 mi)	Simcoe	Port Dover	Simcoe, Port Dover	bicycle-friendly trail
Maitland Trail		Goderich	Auburn	Goderich, Auburn	hiking trail
Merritt Trail	45 km	Waterfront Trail at St. Catharines	Friendship Trail at Port Colborne	St. Catharines, Thorold, Welland, Port Colborne	closely follows Welland Canal Trail
Niagara Recreational Trail	56 km	Waterfront Trail at Niagara-on-the-Lake	Friendship Trail at Fort Erie, Ontario		various segments have separate names, such as "General Brock Trail", biking trail
North Simcoe Railtrail	31.7 km (19.7 mi)	Elmvale	Minesing Wetlands	Elmvale, Phelpston, Anten Mills	hiking, cycling, snowmobiling, ATV-ing, horseback riding, and cross-country skiing
Saugeen Bluffs Trail	2.5 km (1.6 mi)				
Rideau Trail	387 km (240 mi)	Ottawa	Kingston		Partially overlaps the K&P Rail Trail, Cataraqui Trail, and Trans Canada Trail
Saugeen Rail Trail	11 km (6.8 mi)	Southampton	Port Elgin	Port Elgin, Southampton	former CN Rail line, bicycle-friendly trail
SC Johnson Trail	18 km	Cambridge Rail Trail at Paris	Gordon Glaves Pathway at Brantford	Paris, Brantford	inter-urban cycling trail, sponsored by SC Johnson, CKCO-TV and others; part of the Hamilton-Brantford-Cambridge Trails
Seguin Trail	61 km (38 mi)	Rose Point	Fern Glen	Rose Point, Parry Sound, Fern Glen	former Ottawa, Arnprior and Parry Sound Railway segment, closely follows Highway 518
Spurline Trail	2.4 km (1.5 mi)	Uptown Waterloo	Kitchener	Kitchener and Waterloo	Urban rail with trail corridor between the two adjacent cities. The trail runs alongside a freight-only section of the CN Waterloo Spur.
Thornton-Cookstown Trail		Thornton	Cookstown	Thornton, Cookstown	bicycle-friendly trail, terminates at Georgian Downs near Innisfil Heights and Highway 400
Thames Valley Trail	110 km (68 mi)	Elgin Trail at Talbotville Royal	Avon Trail at St. Marys	Talbotville Royal, Delaware, London, St Marys	hiking trail, provides link between Thames Valley Trail and Avon Trail, and London's municipal bike trail network
The Crack	7.5 km	Killarney Provincial Park	Killarney Provincial Park	(Wilderness trail)	hiking trail, known for the view at the top and the cliff creating what appears to be a crack in the mountain filled with boulders
Upper Canada Heritage Trail	10.6 km (6.6 mi)	Waterfront Trail at Niagara-on-the-Lake	St. David's Golf and Country Club, St. David's	Niagara-on-the-Lake	former Michigan Central Railway/New York Central Railroad passenger line until abandonment in 1973, purchased by Niagara-on-the-Lake in 1979, and turned into a trail in 1984
Victoria Rail Trail	85 km (53 mi)	Bobcaygeon Historic Colonization Road/Kawartha Lakes–Haliburton County boundary at Kinmount (Continues as Haliburton County Rail Trail)	Ganaraska Hiking Trail, near Bethany	Lindsay, Fenelon Falls, Kinmount	long biking trail; combined with its extension (Haliburton County Rail Trail), the total distance from one end to the other is 89 km; former CP line, abandoned in 1981
Wainfleet Rail Trail	13 km (8.1 mi)	Lowbanks	Port Colborne	Port Colborne	former CN Rail spur, biking trail
Walter Bean Grand River Trail	76 km (47 mi)	Waterloo	Cambridge	Cambridge, Kitchener and Waterloo	Runs alongside the Grand River. Connects to the Trans Canada Trail at its southern end in Cambridge. Forms a component of the Grand Valley Trail.
Waterfront Trail	1300+ km	Windsor	Quebec border (east of Cornwall)	Leamington, Port Stanley, Dunnville, Port Colborne, Fort Erie, Niagara Falls (CA), Niagara-on-the-Lake, St. Catharines, Grimsby, Stoney Creek, Hamilton, Burlington, Oakville, Mississauga, Toronto, Pickering, Ajax, Whitby, Oshawa, Bowmanville, Newcastle, Port Hope, Cobourg, Brighton, Trenton, Picton, Kingston, Gananoque, Cornwall	one of the longest trails in Ontario, the longest single inter-urban trail in the province
Welland Canal Trail	60 km	Waterfront Trail at St. Catharines	Friendship Trail at Port Colborne	St. Catharines, Thorold, Welland, Port Colborne	travels along Welland Canal

== Prince Edward Island ==
- Confederation Trail

== Quebec ==
- Route Verte trails

Route 1:

- Cycloparc PPJ
- L'Estriade
- La Montagnarde, uses a former rail line for a short distance in Eastman
- La Vagabonde
- La VéloRoute d'Argenteuil, uses a former rail line for 5 km from Brownsburg-Chatham to Saint-André-d'Argenteuil
- Montée du Chemin de Chambly, uses a former rail line in Carignan and Chambly, and runs along it in Longueuil
- Montérégiade
- Parc linéaire de la MRC de Lotbinière
- Parc linéaire des Bois-Francs
- Parc linéaire Le Grand Tronc
- Parcours des Anses
- Sentier de la Rive, uses a former rail line for two short stretches in Windsor and Saint-François-Xavier-de-Brompton
- Sentier de la Vallée
- Sentier Massawippi

Route 2:

- Cyclo-voie de la Ligne du Mocassin
- Cyclo-voie du Pargage des eaux
- Parc Linéaire Le P'tit Train du Nord

Route 3:

- A stretch of Parc régional Beauharnois-Salaberry from Beauharnois to Sainte-Martine
- Pré ferré

Route 4:

- La Campagnarde
- Unnamed rail trail in Bécancour
- Unnamed rail trail in Nicolet

Route 5:

- Parc de la Traversée

Route 6:

- Corridor des Cheminots
- Vélopiste Jacques-Cartier/Portneuf
- Véloroute de la Chaudière

Route 8:

- Parc linéaire interprovincial Petit-Témis

Regional trails:

- Corridor Aérobique
- Coulée verte in Saint-Lambert, and its extension to the east, running through Longueuil
- Cycloroute de Bellechasse
- Parc linéaire de la Vallée de la Gatineau
- Parc linéaire Le Petit Deschaillons
- Parc régional cyclo-nature du Haut-Saint-Laurent
- Piste cyclable de Duhamel
- Piste cyclable du Lac-Brome
- Piste cyclable Monk, not be confused with Parc linéaire Monk, an ATV trail in the same region
- Route des Champs
- Seigneurie des Plaines, uses a formal rail line for two sections
- Sentier de l'Ardoise
- Sentier du Paysan
- Sentier Nature Tomifobia
- Véloroute de Dorchester
- Unnamed rail trail linking Saint-Edmond-de-Grantham and Saint-Guillaume
- Unnamed rail trail running adjacent Route 221 from Saint-Isidore to Saint-Rémi
