= Ontario Highway 38 =

Former Ontario provincial highway

King's Highway 38
- Highway 38 highlighted in red

Route information
- Maintained by City of Kingston, South Frontenac and Central Frontenac Township
- Length: 66.9 km (41.6 mi)
- Existed: April 25, 1934–January 1, 1998

Major junctions
- South end: Highway 401 in Kingston
- North end: Highway 7 near Sharbot Lake

Location
- Country: Canada
- Province: Ontario
- Counties: Frontenac
- Major cities: Kingston
- Towns: South Frontenac Township, Central Frontenac Township
- Villages: Hartington, Harrowsmith, Verona, Godfrey, Parham, Tichborne, Sharbot Lake

Highway system
- Ontario provincial highways; Current; Former; 400-series
← Highway 37	→ Highway 40
Former provincial highways
Highway 39 →

King's Highway 38, commonly referred to as Highway 38, was a provincially maintained highway in the Canadian province of Ontario. The 66.9-kilometre (41.6 mi) road connected Highway 2 and Highway 401 in Kingston with Highway 7 west of Perth. It was designated in 1934 and remained relatively unchanged throughout its existence, aside from some minor diversions and a rerouting through Kingston as a result of the construction of Highway 401 in the mid-1950s. At the beginning of 1998, the entire highway was transferred to the municipalities of Frontenac County through which it travelled: Kingston, South Frontenac and Central Frontenac. Today the former highway is named Road 38 and Gardiners Road, but is still referred to as Highway 38 by locals.

== Route description ==
Former Highway 38 south of Highway 401 as it enters Kingston

Highway 38 was a south–north route located within Frontenac County in eastern Ontario. When it was decommissioned as a provincial highway in 1998, the southern terminus was at Highway 401 in the northwestern suburbs of Kingston, while the northern terminus was at Highway 7 north of the town of Sharbot Lake, 36 km (22 mi) west of Perth. South of Highway 401, the former highway continues as Gardiner's Road, which was decommissioned prior to 1997.

The route of Highway 38 in 1997 began at Exit 611 of Highway 401, and proceeded north across Highway 401 before curving northwest. The former highway passes through a blend of farmland and mixed forests outside of communities as far north as Hartington. Within Kingston, it travels through the community of Glenvale before crossing into South Frontenac Township. It passes through Murvale and crosses Millhaven Creek before turning north. As the former route approaches Harrowsmith, it encounters the Trans Canada Trail, an all-season hiking trail built along the former right-of-way of the Kingston and Pembroke Railway (K&P), which generally parallels the route north of this point.

Continuing northward, the former route of Highway 38 travels through Hartington, then descends into the Canadian Shield. North of this point, the scenery drastically changes, with farmland mostly giving way to dense forests and granite rock outcroppings, and the route meanders around rugged terrain and numerous lakes. It crosses Hardwood Creek as it enters Verona and winds between Verona Lake, Vanluven Lake and Howes Lake. At the community of Piccadilly, the former highway enters Central Frontenac Township and soon thereafter passes Godfrey.

North of Godfrey, the former route of Highway 38 travels around and east of Cole Lake. It passes through a barren stretch of forest for several kilometres before reaching the community of Parham, where through traffic must turn to remain on the route. It proceeds east to Tichborne, where it curves north and around the east side of Eagle Lake. It provides access to Camp Oconto, an all-girls overnight camp on Eagle Lake, then passes through the community of Oconto. After travelling through several more kilometres of forest, the former highway enters the village of Sharbot Lake via a causeway across Sharbot Lake. It meanders through the village before ending at Highway 7.

== History ==
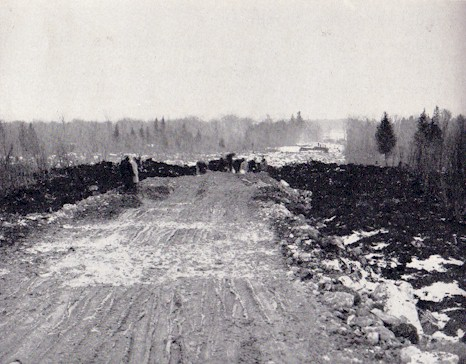
Filling in a swamp on the Hartington–Verona Diversion in 1936

Highway 38 was established in the mid-1930s shortly after the completion of Highway 7 between Madoc and Perth in August 1932. The Department of Highways (DHO) assumed responsibility over the 76.0 km (47.2 mi) Sharbot Lake Road on April 25, 1934, which was gravel-surfaced north of Cataraqui and generally paralleled the K&P Railway. Beginning in downtown Kingston, it featured a 5.3 km (3.3 mi) concurrency with Highway 2 along Princess Street to Cataraqui, where it then branched north along Sydenham Road and McIvor Road to the present-day Road 38. The concurrency with Highway 2 was removed in 1954.

Following the assumption of the route, the DHO began work on several improvement projects. In 1935, a crossing was constructed over the Canadian Pacific Railway in Sharbot Lake. This structure remained in place for 80 years until it was demolished in July 2015. In 1936 the DHO began construction of the Verona–Hartington Diversion, which bypassed the original route of the highway along what is now Boyce Road, Quarry Road and Burnett Road. The 3.5 km (2.2 mi) diversion was completed in early 1938, and the old routing decommissioned on January 10, 1938.

For several years following the completion of the Kingston Bypass (Highway 401), Highway 38 forked and featured two southern termini. Pictured is the 1958 Ontario Road Map.

In 1954, construction of the Kingston Bypass of Highway 401 began. As part of the work, a new road was constructed north from Highway 2 approximately 2.4 km (1.5 mi) west of Sydenham Road which would serve as the western terminus of the Kingston Bypass when it opened in November 1957. Highway 38 was signed along this new road, which is now known as Midland Avenue. The old route to Cataraqui, which now featured an interchange with Highway 401, also remained signed as Highway 38. For several years, Highway 38 forked in two at Highway 401. In 1960 construction began on a full interchange with the western fork as part of a larger project to build the eastbound lanes of Highway 401 to Odessa. Both were completed and opened on December 5, 1961. The eastern fork was truncated at Highway 401 around this time; it was decommissioned entirely by 1966, leaving only the western fork. Highway 38 was now 69.9 km (43.4 mi) in length, and would remain as such until the 1990s.

When Highway 38 was designated in 1934, only the concurrency with Highway 2 and the portion along Sydenham Road was paved, while the remainder was gravel-surfaced. The portion north to and including the Hartington–Verona Diversion was paved prior to the opening of the diversion in 1938. Following World War II, 16.8 km (10.4 mi) of the route from south of Tichbourne to Highway 7 was paved in 1946. The remainder of the highway, between Verona and Tichbourne, was paved between 1950 and 1953.

As part of a series of budget cuts initiated by premier Mike Harris under his Common Sense Revolution platform in 1995, numerous highways deemed to no longer be of significance to the provincial network were decommissioned and responsibility for the routes transferred to a lower level of government, a process referred to as downloading. Highway 38 was deemed to serve a local function and was transferred to Frontenac County on January 1, 1998. Since Frontenac County does not maintain roads, the former highway is now maintained by South Frontenac Township, Central Frontenac Township and the City of Kingston, the latter of which separated from Frontenac County on the same day. South Frontenac Township refers to its portion as Township Road 38, while Kingston and Central Frontenac refer to their portions as Road 38. However, locals still refer to the route as Highway 38.

== Major intersections ==
The following table lists the major junctions along Highway 38, as noted by the Ministry of Transportation of Ontario.

Division	Location	km	mi	Destinations	Notes
Kingston		−3.0	−1.9	County Road 2 (Princess Street)	Formerly Highway 2; decommissioned prior to 1998
Kingston		0.0	0.0	Highway 401 – Toronto, Cornwall	Exit 611
Kingston		5.4	3.4	County Road 3 (Unity Road)	
Frontenac	South Frontenac	12.3	7.6	County Road 4 west (Yarker Road)	
Frontenac	Harrowsmith	16.5	10.3	County Road 18 south (Wilton Road)	
Frontenac	Harrowsmith	16.6	10.3	County Road 5 east (Harrowsmith Road)	
Frontenac	Verona	24.8	15.4	County Road 7 west (Bellrock Road)	
Frontenac	Verona	27.2	16.9	County Road 19 east (Desert Lake Road)	
Frontenac	Godfrey	33.1	20.6	Westport Road east	
Frontenac	Parham	47.4	29.5	Wagerville Road west	
Frontenac	Central Frontenac	57.5	35.7	Crow Lake Road east	
Frontenac	Central Frontenac	66.9	41.6	Highway 7 / TCH	
1.000 mi = 1.609 km; 1.000 km = 0.621 mi

== See also ==
- List of numbered roads in Frontenac County
