= North Simcoe Railtrail =

Coordinates: 44.411518°N 79.813931°W

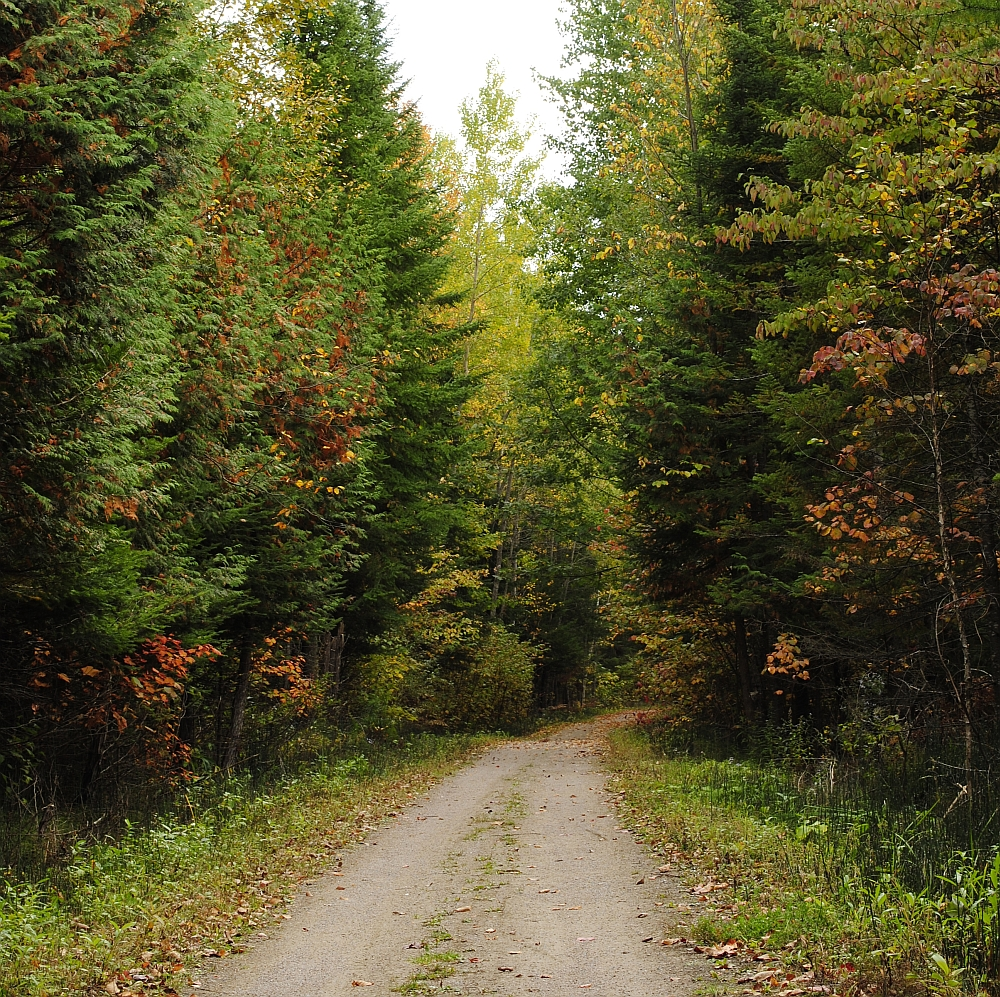
- Looking north from Fort Willow

North Simcoe Railtrail
- Length: 31.7 km (19.7 mi)
- Location: Simcoe County
- Established: 1992
- Use: Hiking, cycling, snowmobiling, ATV-ing, horseback riding, and cross-country skiing.
- Sights: Minesing Wetlands, Fort Willow, Josephine Ruins, Mayer’s Marsh, Minesing Station, Dense Hardwood Forest, Elmvale Heritage Park
- Surface: Crushed stone

The North Simcoe Railtrail is a recreational trail located in the Township of Springwater, Simcoe County, Ontario, Canada.

The trail follows the route of the former North Simcoe Railway, built in 1878, and abandoned in 1991 by CN. All structures were removed upon closure of the line, although a replica station has since been erected.

The North Simcoe Railtrail is part of the Trans Canada Trail and the city council of Barrie is working to connect it together, as the Railtrail ends two streets from the beginning of the Trail.

== See also ==
- List of rail trails in Canada
