= Parham, Ontario =

Community in Canada

Parham
- Unincorporated community
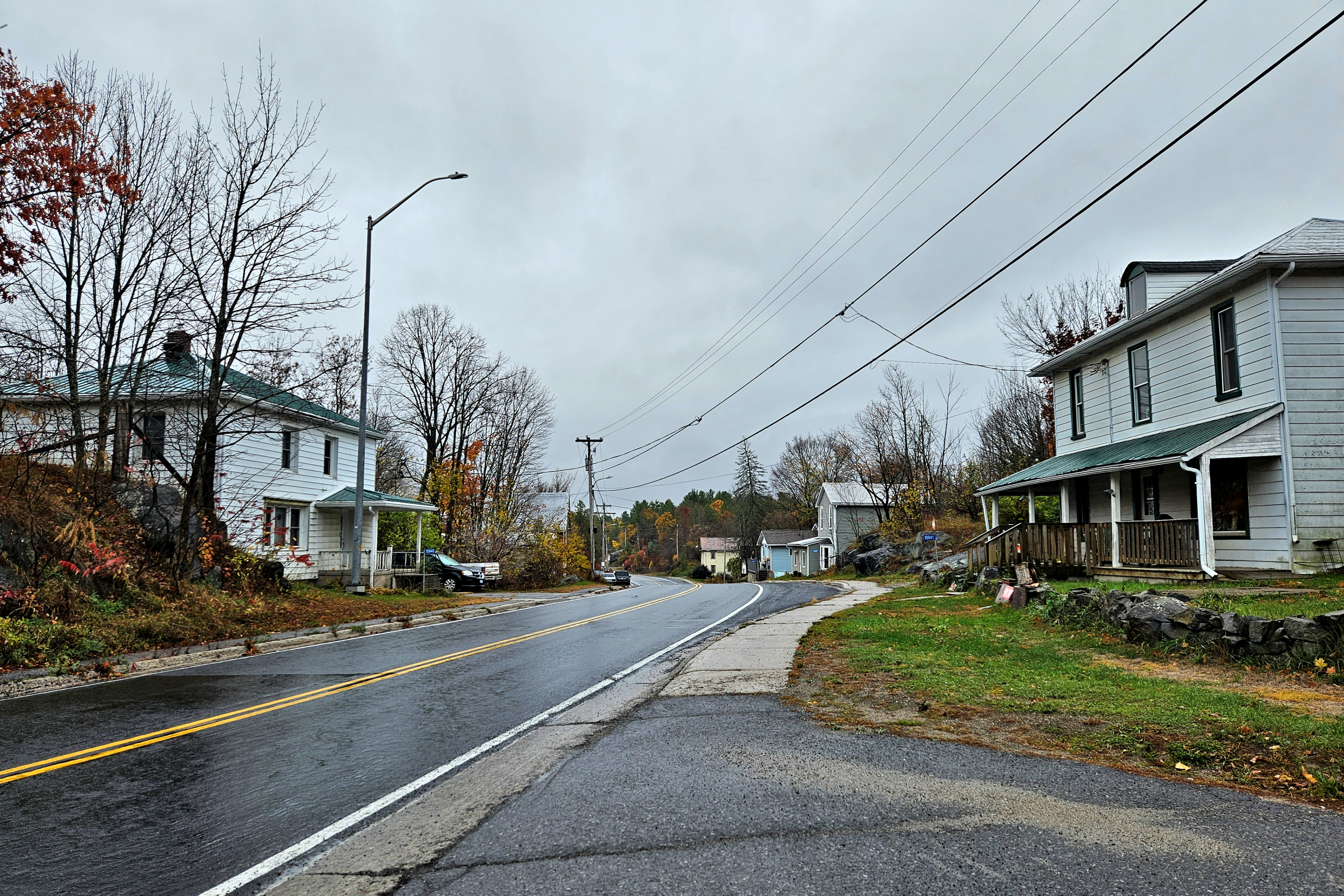

- Location within Southern Ontario
- Coordinates: 44°39′00″N 76°43′00″W
- Country: Canada
- Province: Ontario
- County: Frontenac
- Municipality: Central Frontenac

Government
  - Fed. riding: Lanark—Frontenac
  - Prov. riding: Lanark—Frontenac—Kingston
- Time zone: UTC-5 (EST)
  - Summer (DST): UTC-4 (EDT)
- Postal code: K0H 2K0
- Area code(s): 613

Parham, Ontario is located an hour north of Kingston, Ontario and two hours west of Canada's capital, Ottawa, Ontario. It is located in Central Frontenac Township, which includes other small towns such as Godfrey, Sharbot Lake, and Tichborne. Parham's population is roughly 250, which classifies it as one of the smallest towns in the northern area.

Parham has one general store, a post office and two churches, one Free Methodist church, a United church, and the former #297 Mayflower Oddfellows Hall built in 1893.

The fire hall is located beside the Parham Fair Grounds where the Parham Agricultural Fair is held annually. The fair involves 4-H members showing cattle and horses. There are also riding lawn mower races, livestock exhibitions and a palace with baking, crafts and produce.

On June 7, 2020, a gunman opened fire on his neighbours, after lighting a building on fire which spread to the adjacent historic century-old St. James Anglican church, destroying both buildings. One person received injuries from the shooting. The man was charged with attempted murder, arson and firearms-related offences.

== See also ==
- RKY Camp
