= Hamilton–Brantford–Cambridge Trails =

Network of multiuse recreational trails in Ontario, Canada

The Hamilton–Brantford–Cambridge Trails are a network of multiuse interurban recreational rail trails connecting several municipalities in southern Ontario, Canada. The trails are part of the Southern Ontario Loop of the Trans Canada Trail. From end to end, the trail is 80 kilometres (50 mi) long, running from Cambridge south through Paris to Brantford and then East to central Hamilton.

== Gordon Glaves Memorial Pathway ==
The first portion of the Hamilton–Brantford–Cambridge Trails to be completed was named the Gordon Glaves Memorial Pathway in 1993.

== Cambridge to Paris Rail Trail ==
The second portion of the Hamilton–Brantford–Cambridge Trails is the Cambridge to Paris Rail Trail, which was opened in 1994 along the right of way of the now-defunct Lake Erie and Northern Railway. The northern trailhead is in Galt off Water Street, and from there the trail passes south through Glen Morris, a distance of approximately 9.1 kilometres (5.7 mi). It then continues on to Paris until officially terminating and becoming the SC Johnson Trail. The total length of the trail is 18 kilometres (11 mi).

== Hamilton to Brantford Rail Trail ==
In 1996, the Hamilton to Brantford Rail Trail was the third portion of the Hamilton–Brantford–Cambridge Trails to be completed. It runs 32 kilometres (20 mi) from Hamilton to Brantford through the towns of Dundas and Jerseyville. The entire former railway bed is surfaced with stone dust and marked with a post at each kilometre, with frequent benches by the side of the path. From Brantford to Jerseyville the trail is owned and maintained by the Grand River Conservation Authority with the Jerseyville-Hamilton section similarly owned by The Hamilton Region Conservation Authority.

Beginning in Hamilton just north of the Chedoke Municipal Golf Course, the trail runs West over Ontario Highway 403, through Ainslie Wood and into the Dundas Valley Conservation Area. Parking and washroom facilities are available at the Dundas Valley Trail Centre, 5.5 kilometres (3.4 mi) from the trail head. The path winds up the face of the Niagara Escarpment for 8.5 kilometres (5.3 mi), reaching the trail's peak elevation at the ruins of Summit Station on the boundary of the Hamilton Harbour and Grand River watersheds.

The trail then descends through farmland to Jerseyville, where another parking lot is located at kilometre 18.5. It continues in a nearly straight line for several kilometres before turning South, crossing under the 403 and passing another parking area at the 30 kilometres (19 mi) point. The final 2 kilometres (1.2 mi) run through Brantford to connect with the Gordon Glaves Memorial Pathway.

== SC Johnson Trail ==
The SC Johnson Trail (or SC Johnson Rail Trail) follows another section of abandoned Lake Erie and Northern Railway right of way between Paris and Brantford. It connects to the Gordon Glaves Memorial Pathway in Brantford.

The trail opened in 1998, completing the network of off-road trails from Hamilton to Cambridge.

== See also ==
- Golden Horseshoe
- List of rail trails
- List of trails in Canada
