= Grand Valley Trail =

Canadian hiking trail

The Grand Valley Trail is 250 km long hiking route in Ontario and runs from Port Maitland on Lake Erie to Belwood. It is managed by the volunteer group, the Grand Valley Trails Association (GVTA). Hikers are able to identify the main Grand Valley Trail by the white blazes approximately 5 cm wide by 15 cm high. The trail is well-maintained by dedicated volunteers and enjoys good relationships with the nearby landowners. A guidebook is published by the GVTA.

== See also ==
- List of trails in Canada
