= Godfrey, Ontario =

Community in Canada

Godfrey
- Unincorporated community
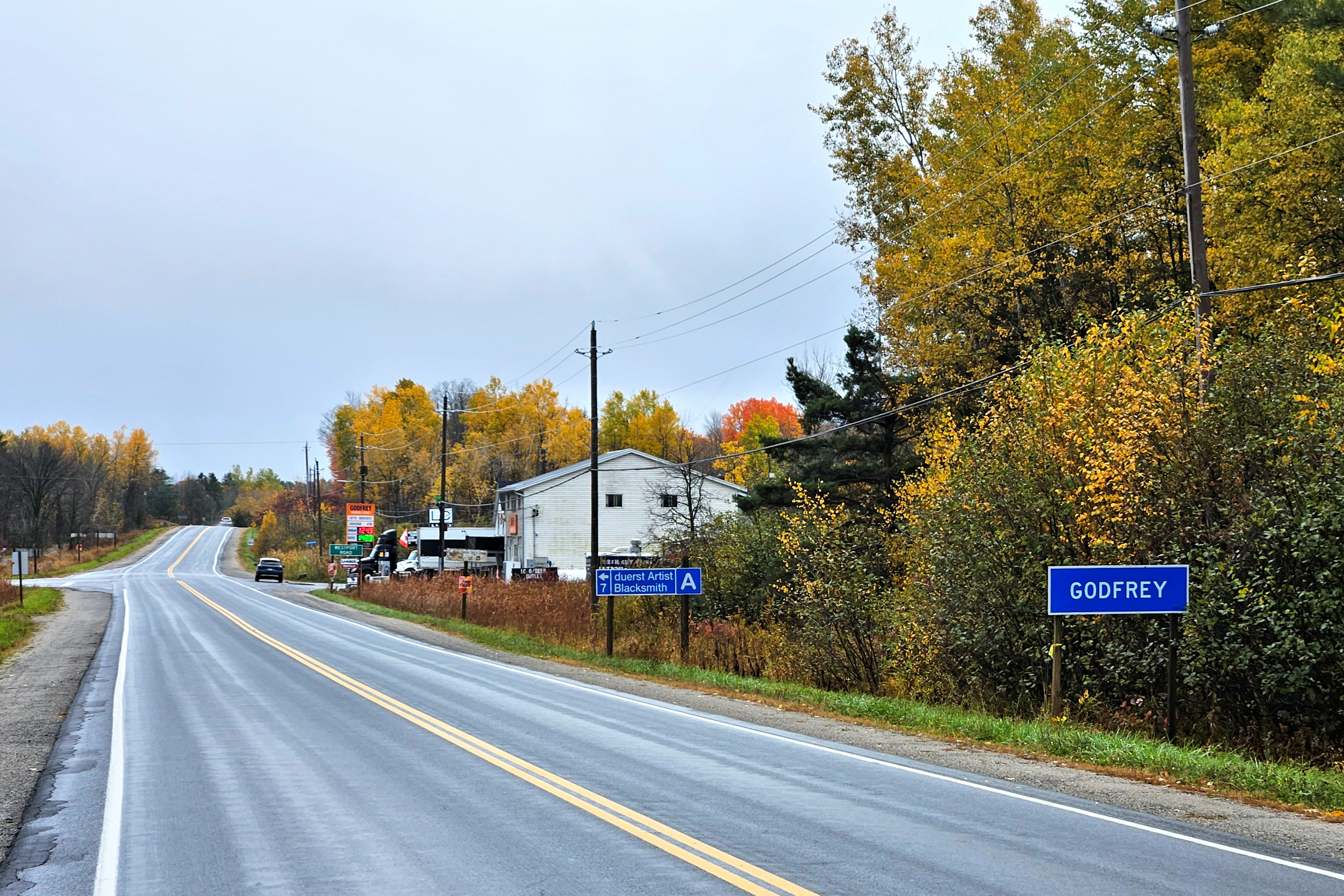

- Location within Southern Ontario
- Coordinates: 44°32′30″N 76°40′45″W
- Country: Canada
- Province: Ontario
- County: Frontenac
- Municipality: Central Frontenac
- Settled: 1854

Government
  - Fed. riding: Lanark—Frontenac
  - Prov. riding: Lanark—Frontenac—Kingston
- Time zone: UTC-5 (EST)
  - Summer (DST): UTC-4 (EDT)
- Postal code: K0H 1T0
- Area code(s): 613

Godfrey is a small community located about 40 minutes' drive time north of Kingston, Ontario, Canada on Hwy. 38. It is named for Chester H. Godfrey, one of the original settlers, who donated land on which the village was built. While there is currently no specific village, it can be described as the area of Highway 38 that extends between the villages of Verona and Parham, as well as that portion of Westport Road extending to the hamlet of Burridge. It also includes the former settlement of Cole Lake. (which possessed a separate rail station, known as Hinchinbrooke Station, and postal outlet up to the early part of the 20th century). Godfrey was originally in the Township of Hinchinbrooke which has since become amalgamated into the township of Central Frontenac, which also encompasses the townships of Kennebec, Olden and Oso.

== History ==
The place currently known as Godfrey was founded as "Deniston" on 10 October 1854, based on the placement of a post office by the same name. Locals referred to the place as "Iron Ore Junction", due to the large ore deposits and other mineral deposits in the area. The presence of iron ore was known since 1869 when it was reported in the provincial gazetteer that "Iron and plumbago are in the neighbourhood." The place was renamed to Godfrey on 1 April 1878 named in honor of Chester H. Godfrey, the man who had donated land which the village is built and due to his position as Justice of the Peace of Deniston. References to a place name of "Bedford Station" can also be found, as the rail station on the Kingston and Pembroke line in Godfrey, was known as "Bedford Station".

Chester Godfrey inherited the land on the 3rd Concession in Hinchinbrooke Township that became the town, Godfrey, bearing his namesake. He inherited this land from his father, Warren Godfrey when his father moved on to Olden Township. Warren Godfrey applied for land patent for the land in December 1843 to the Governor General of British North America, Sir Charles Theophilus Metcalfe. The land patent was granted on 21 March 1844. Warren Godfrey Land Patent Warren Godfrey was also the construction supervisor of 41 miles of the Frontenac Road in Hinchenbrooke Township, northward through Olden and Clarendon Townships to the intersection of the Mississippi Road.

First settlers to the area were John McKnight, James Hickey, Michael Judge, James Hill, Terry Nefcey and James Kennedy. First babies born to the new settlers were James Hickey and Ned Judge in 1837; born the same day only minutes apart.

Godfrey became home to two general stores, McGowan's and R.B. Howes and Son General Store which was also an Esso dealer. R.B. Howes and Son was founded in 1885 by Richard Bennett Howes who also took the post master position for Godfrey. Richard Howes was joined in business by his son, Joe Howes, in 1924 and the General Store became known as R.B. Howes and Son. When Richard died, Joe assumed ownership of the store and took the position of postmaster. He was postmaster until retirement in 1960 when the position was transferred to Richard Leslie Judge. Joe Howes however, continued to run the store and eventually transferred the business to his son, Richard (Dick) Howes. The store closed in 1981; the end of the era of the General Store.

== Kingston and Pembroke Railway (K&P) ==
The Kingston and Pembroke Railway established the Bedford Station in Godfrey, opening in 1875. As many as eight trains would come into the station daily.

== Mining ==
As mentioned above, ore deposits were known to the residents of Godfrey for some time before the K&P railway opened up the area to larger scale mining. K&P ran a branch line to a mine known as the Glendower mine, four miles from the Bedford station.

=== Iron ore ===
Starting 1873, the Glendower Company was formed and mined the Glendower Mine for iron ore for approximately seven years. In that timeframe, 12,000 tons of iron ore were extracted, hauled to Bedford Station either by wagon or sleigh and shipped to Elmira, New York. After the seven years, the Glendower Company surrendered their lease on the land. In 1882, a company of American capitalists was formed under the name of the "Zanesville Company" which eventually merged with the Kingston and Pembroke company in approximately 1887. During the operation by the Zanesville Company, they constructed the K&P spur line from Bedford to the mine and the mine operated productively for another four to five years. The Zanesville mine operators found sulphur mixed with the ore at a depth of 180 feet and ceased mine operations until they were able to use drills that enabled them to mine to a depth of 300–400 feet and low sulphur content (one to three percent) ore was again discovered. However, by 1895, the mine was no longer in operation.

Other mines in the area were the Howse Mine, and Black Lake Mine.

=== Feldspar ===
In 1901, Feldspar was also found in abundance near Godfrey. It was mined and shipped to the United States via the Bedford K&P Station. The feldspar was mined at the Richardson Feldspar Mine which ultimately became the largest producer of feldspar in Canada: producing 228,690 tons of feldspar between 1901 and 1951. The mine, located in concession II, lot 1, is found between Thirteen Island Lake and Desert Lake. In the 1880s, mining rights were acquired by the Kingston Feldspar Mining Company, part of what is now James Richardson & Sons, Limited. Mining did not start in earnest until the early 1900s. The mine was also known as the Desert Lake or Hoppins Property, as Richardson leased the land from owner, A. Hoppins. Output from the mine varied between 200 tons per day in 1902 and 130 tons per day in 1906, and represented, at the time, the largest feldspar producing mine in the province. This was evidently made possible by the accessibility of ore in the mine, as reported in 1903, "feldspar covers the floor of this whole mine-area, practically all of it clean and pure". The feldspar mined at this site was analyzed By the Ontario Bureau of Mines in 1905 to have the following composition: silica 66.23%, alumina 18.77%, potash 12.09% and soda 3.11%. Descriptively, it was reported to be "rich, light-red [in] colour, remarkably well formed, with well developed cleavage, lustrous, translucent and pronounced to be microline".

To transport the feldspar to market, the workmen hoisted the feldspar ore to the top of a hill in two-ton buckets which were transported by inclined tramway to Thirteen Island Lake. The ore was then tugged across the Thirteen Island Lake, transferred and tugged across Thirty Island Lake. From there, it was taken to the rail spur line at the Glendower mine and to the Bedford Station of the K&P. The ore was then moved to Kingston and across Lake Ontario to the United States.

From 1916 to 1918, the mine was owned and operated by Feldspar Ltd. of Toronto. The mine remained idle until 1928 when it was leased to the Genesse Feldspar Company of Rochester, New York, and operated until 1931. Leased again in 1941 to E.H. Storms and S.A. Price of Toronto under the name Federal Feldspar Company, the mine produced 414 tons of feldspar. In 1945, the Canadian Flint and Spar Company of Ottawa purchased the mine and operated until 1951. Recent mine mapping operations indicate that the mine could contain 80,000 tons of quartz.

=== Mica ===
Mica was another mineral mined in quantity in the Godfrey area. The mica was recorded as having been mined on the property of Chester Godfrey, with eight prospect pits, averaging 14 feet in depth and providing a 60-ton output in 1891. The mica itself was described as superior light amber; very hard and flexible. In 1891, the Bureau of Mines reported that the main vein in the Godfrey Minehad not yet been discovered which indicated more mica could be mined.

Of the mica mined in Ontario, 90-95% of it was used in the electric industry. This was true until the depression of 1907 stalled the electric trades which caused a drop in the mica mining trades in the province. Those supporting the mica industry were directly affected; for example, mica producers dropped in Ottawa from 1,500 persons to less than 100.

Mica was not mined again in Godfrey until about 1940 in some small quantity. The Godfrey mine is now classified as "past producing without reserves".

== Hill's School and public education history in the area ==
In 1840, a one-room log school house was opened to teach the children in new community of Deniston. The log school was replaced by another school in 1901. . In 1940, the Hill School, as the locals called it, was documented by the Province of Ontario as the Hinchinbrooke School. On average, 26 students were taught by Mrs. Mamie Hill who earned a $700 annual salary. The Provincial report indicated that the type of school building was "F" which is referenced on page 3 of the report to be a "frame" building.

When originally built, Hill School, would have been part of the school system in Hinchinbrooke, in the County of Frontenac. The residents of Hinchinbrooke had been trying throughout the mid-1800s to improve their educational potential given their meager resources, as evidenced in 1860, when superintendent of schools, Thomas R. Dupuis, esq, commented in his annual report: "This is a back Township, and very poor, and the schools are proportionally small and badly provided with teachers and means of teaching. However, there is a marked increase in attendance, and an improvement in the state of schools. From the interest taken in school matters, and the energy displayed by the officers of the section, it promises to become one of the most flourishing sections of the township. " The issue of free education was not missed on the residents of this "back Township", whereby as early as 1858, three-quarters of the schools in Hinchinbrooke were free. The others required 25 cents per pupil per month but tuition from the pupil was rarely collected in full measure. Only 1850, with the passage of the Common School Acts, did free education become dictated by law by allowing property taxes to be collected for the purposes of providing education to all pupils. The groundwork for this legislation was laid by Egerton Ryerson in his Circular to the County Municipalities, in 1846.

== Present day ==
Godfrey is a part of South Frontenac and Central Frontenac Townships as of the 1998 amalgamation of the Townships of Hinchinbrooke, Kennebec, Olden and Oso.

Local Postal Code is K0H 1T0 and the Godfrey Canada Post location is 8109 County Road 38.
