= Line Spike Frontenac =

2025 music festival in Harrowsmith, Ontario

Line Spike 2025
- Genre: Classic rock; Country music; Pop music
- Dates: June 28–29, 2025
- Locations: Harrowsmith, Ontario, Canada
- Coordinates: 44.404°N 76.648°W
- Founders: Jeremy Campbell
- Website: www.linespike.ca

Location in Canada

Line Spike Frontenac is a two-day music festival held on a farm near Harrowsmith, Ontario at the end of June, just ahead of the Canada Day national holiday.

The festival organizer, Jeremy Campbell of Get2ThePoint Productions Inc. who worked at Woodstock '99, promoted a "Power of Positivity Musical Harvest" weekend after a personal cancer diagnosis and amid tense United States and Canada trade tensions, and threatened annexation as the 51st state in early 2025. Following the broadcast of Mike Myers giving an "elbow's up" sign on Saturday Night Live and a subsequent grassroots movement of patriotism in Canada, Campbell formed an all-Canadian lineup consisting of former Juno Award winners and nominees, Canadian Music Hall of Famers, as well as local talent, MC'd by former MuchMusic veejay Bill Welychka

An organizational dispute ended in the pulling of the festival's liquor licence by the Alcohol and Gaming Commission of Ontario, as the request of the council of South Frontenac two days before the inaugural event regarding perceived safety measures. Regardless, the festival proceeded with no incidents, and drew a crowd of over 4000 attendees.

== 2025 Performers ==
The inaugural event took place over the weekend of June 28 and 29, 2025, with Burton Cummings and Walk Off The Earth headlining each of the two days.

Other performers included Chantal Kreviazuk, Alan Frew, Madison Galloway, Luscious, Kelsi Mayne, Tom Green, Grievous Angels, Kasador, and visual artist Goud Created.

== 2026 Performers ==
A sophomore event occurred at the same location with almost twice the number of performers as the 2025 festival, Scaled-down from its inaugural year yet showcasing more local talent, on June 27 and 28, 2026. Returning artist Chantal Kreviazuk and her husband Raine Maida headlined the show.

Other performers included Harm & Ease, The Devin Cuddy Band, I The Mountain, Wil & Co., Abby Stewart, Miss Emily, Jessie T., Crooked Wood, Jay Smith, Kasador, The Soul Shakers Union, Graven, Emily Steele and The Deal, Van Camp, Raxx, and visual artist Goud Created. A third followup festival is planned for 2027.
