= Cataraqui Trail =

Recreational rail trail in Ontario, Canada

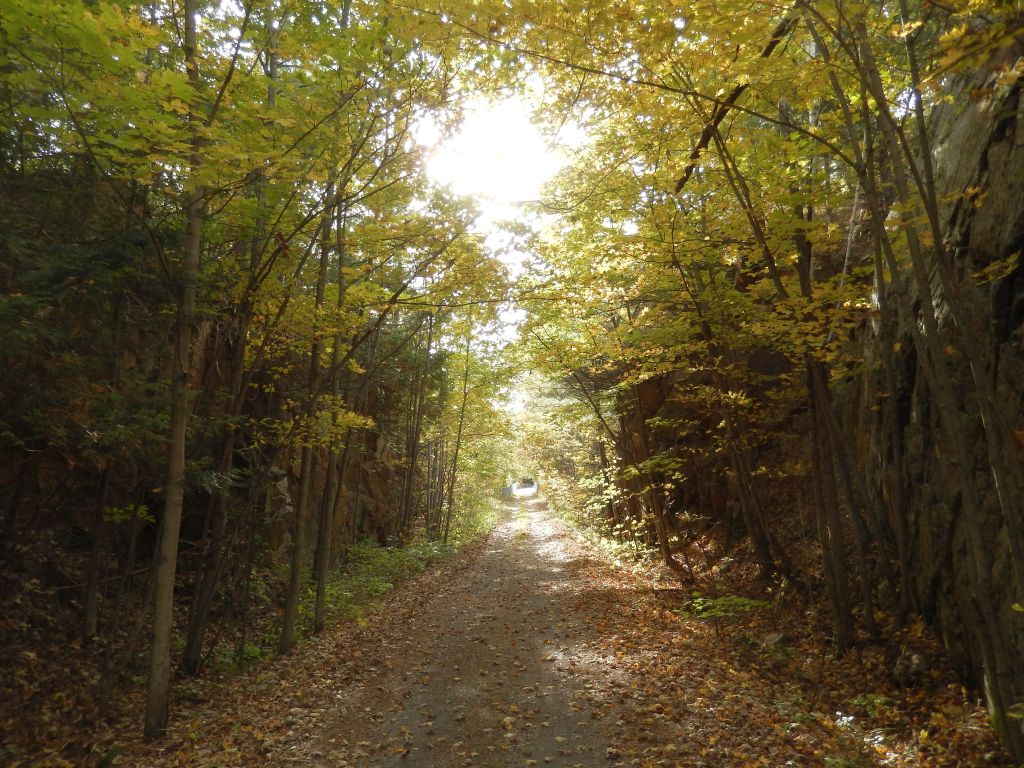
- Cataraqui Trail east of Chaffey's Lock
- Length: 104 kilometres (65 mi)
- Location: Eastern Ontario, Canada
- Trailheads: Smiths Falls; Strathcona
- Use: Hiking, cycling, jogging, horseback riding, cross-country skiing, snowshoeing, and with a permit: snowmobiling
- Difficulty: Easy
- Season: Year-round
- Sights: Rideau Canal, Canadian Shield
- Hazards: Mosquitoes, poison ivy, wild parsnip

The Cataraqui Trail is a 104-kilometre (65 mi) multi-use linear recreational rail trail in Eastern Ontario, Canada. The route passes by farmland, woods, lakes, and wetlands. The trail begins southwest of Smiths Falls, at a parking lot south of Ontario Highway 15 designated as kilometre zero (44°53′24″N 76°01′50″W).

Numbered posts are situated every one to five kilometres. In its midsection the trail crosses the UNESCO Frontenac Arch Biosphere Reserve. The 78.2-kilometre (48.6 mi) segment running from Smiths Falls to Harrowsmith is part of the Trans Canada Trail. The Rideau Canal is crossed on a 1912 railway trestle at Chaffey's Locks, near kilometre post 42. The K&P Rail Trail intersects the Cataraqui Trail at Harrowsmith. Both the main Rideau Trail and its blue-blazed side trails share the Cataraqui Trail right-of-way in several places. Trail's end is reached at Strathcona near Napanee. Access points and parking lots are dotted along the route.

The route runs along the roadbed of the former Canadian National Railway (CN). Most of the railbed was donated to the Cataraqui Region Conservation Authority (CRCA) by CN in 1997. Some sections are privately owned but where access has been granted. Except for emergency and maintenance vehicles, and snowmobiles with an Ontario Federation of Snowmobile Clubs permit in winter, motorized travel is not permitted.

== See also ==
- List of trails in Canada
