= Guelph and Goderich Railway =

Former railway in southern Ontario, Canada

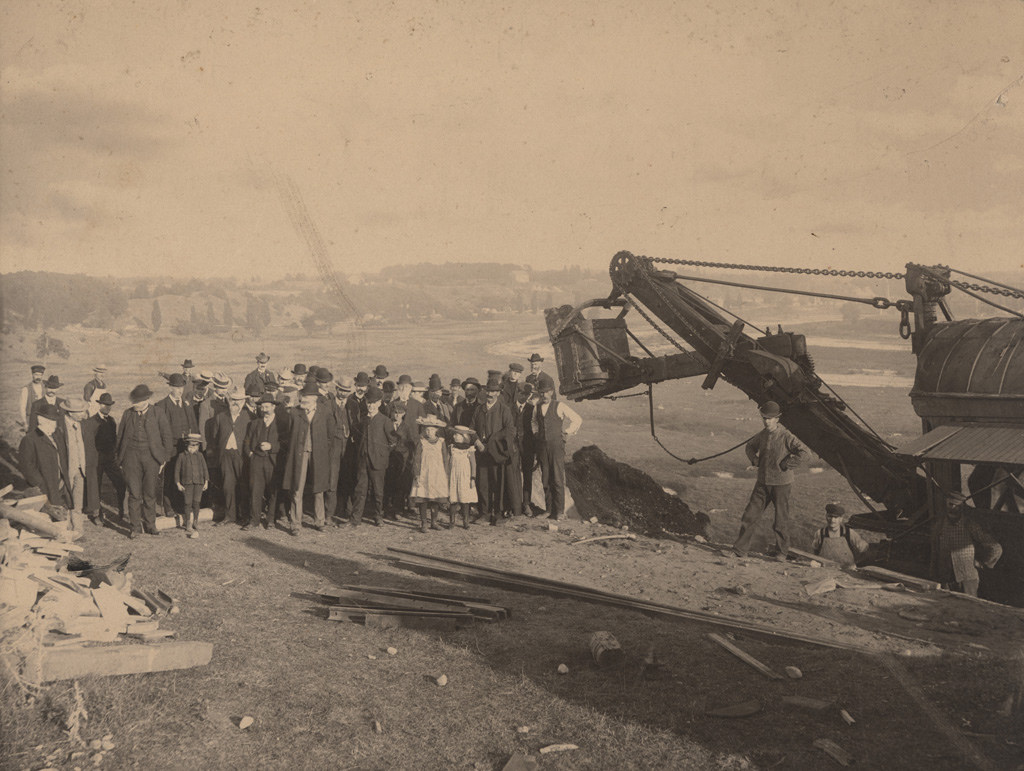
Turning first sod for the Goderich and Guelph Railway in Goderich, September 12, 1904

The Guelph and Goderich Railway was a railway in southern Ontario, Canada to connect Guelph to the harbour at Goderich on Lake Huron.

== History ==
The city of Guelph owned the Guelph Junction Railway (GJR, incorporated in 1884 and owned by a consortium of merchants and the City of Guelph) to connect to the Canadian Pacific Railway (CPR) mainline 15 miles south of town in Campbellville. This line was completed in 1888 and by May 1887 had been leased to the CPR. The railway's charter was amended in 1886 to allow construction of a line to Goderich which was delayed for several years. Eventually, the city of Guelph applied pressure on the CPR to get the line built.

The CPR had finished three surveys for the Goderich line by December 1903; the first via Linwood, Atwood, Brussels and Listowel; the second via Conestogo, Linwood, Atwood, Brussels; and the third via Seaforth and Clinton. Growing frustrated, the GJR announced in 1904 they would petition Parliament seeking a charter to incorporate the Goderich & Guelph Railway, between both namesake cities with branches to Listowel, St. Marys, Stratford and Clinton.

The CPR finally agreed to build the line to Goderich from Guelph and construction began in 1904. The line was laid with 80-pound-per-yard (40 kg/m) rail and reached Goderich in 1907. There was also a 16-mile (26 km) branch line from Linwood to Listowel. Envisioned branches to Stratford and St. Marys were never built. The principal stations were located in Guelph, Elmira, Linwood, Milverton, Monkton, Walton, Blyth and Goderich. On October 6, 1904, the G&G was leased to the CPR for 999 years, with the City of Guelph obtaining a prohibition against diverting G&G traffic off the Guelph Junction Railway line.

== G2G Rail Trail ==
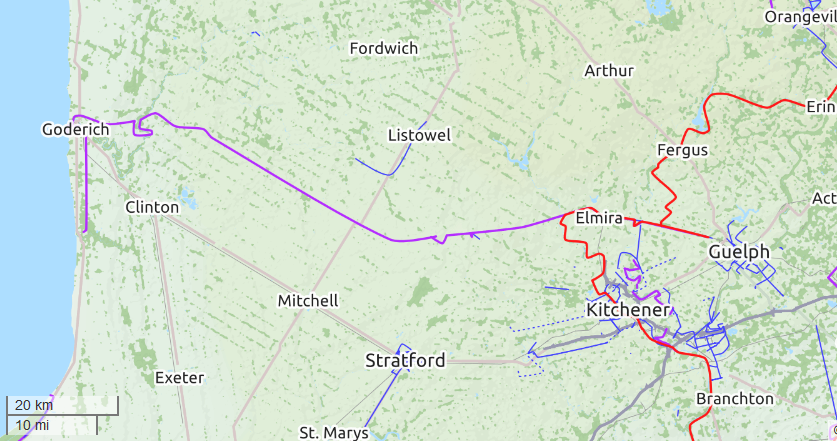
Map showing the trails system in the wider region.

The 127-km line between Guelph and Goderich was abandoned by the CPR in 1988. The Province of Ontario purchased the land shortly thereafter with the intention of protecting an infrastructure corridor. The original plan was to build a water supply pipeline from Lake Huron to Guelph. As a result of amendments to the Great Lakes Water Quality Agreement (GLWQA), before construction could begin, this usage was prohibited. The corridor was retained for future use and designated an interim use for non-motorized recreation. Various organizations such as the Maitland Trail Association and Kissing Bridge Trail Association have subsequently leased portions of the land from the province. Over the next 20 years, upkeep varied from total neglect to carefully maintained as narrated in Lynda Wilson's vivid descriptions while walking the full trail in 2015.

Connecting portions have been opened as the G2G Rail Trail, a recreational trail for use by walkers, hikers and bikers. G2G Rail Trail Inc. is a non-profit charitable organization.

In the summer of 2020 a team of students and local volunteers completed a total refurbishment from end to end which included brush clearing, grading and surfacing with stone dust.

In June 2024 a tunnel was added under County Road 25 outside of Blyth to improve safety by eliminating a crossing between the trail and the road.

== See also ==
- Waterloo Junction Railway
- Canadian Pacific Railway
- List of Ontario railways
- List of defunct Canadian railways
- List of trails in Canada
