= Rideau Trail =

Hiking trail in eastern Ontario, Canada

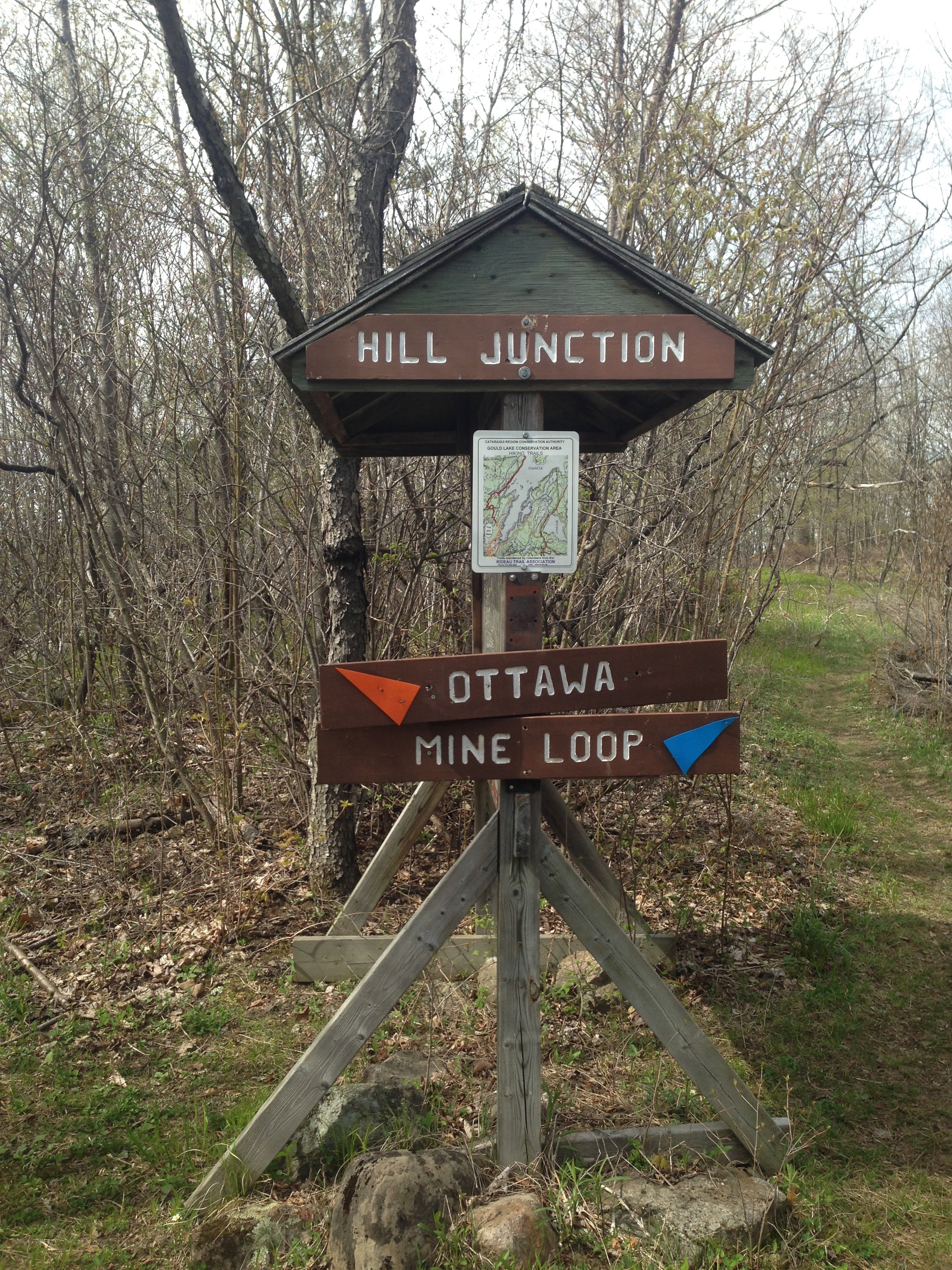
- Rideau Trail junction in Gould Lake Conservation Area
- Length: 387 km (240 mi)
- Location: Ontario, Canada
- Trailheads: Ottawa and Kingston
- Use: Hiking, Trail running snowshoeing, cross-country skiing
- Highest point: Foley Mountain, 207 m (679 ft)
- Lowest point: Ottawa River, 44 m (144 ft)
- Difficulty: easy to moderate
- Season: Year-round
- Sights: Rideau Canal, Canadian Shield

The Rideau Trail is a 387-kilometre (240 mi) hiking trail in Ontario, Canada, linking Ottawa and Kingston. Crossing both public and private lands, the trail was created and opened in 1971. It is named for the Rideau Canal which also connects Ottawa and Kingston, although the two only occasionally connect. The trail crosses terrain ranging from the placid farmland of the Ottawa River and St. Lawrence River valleys to the rugged Canadian Shield in Frontenac Provincial Park. The trail also passes through Richmond, Perth, and Smiths Falls. It is intended only for walking (hiking), snowshoeing, and cross-country skiing.

== Route and administration ==
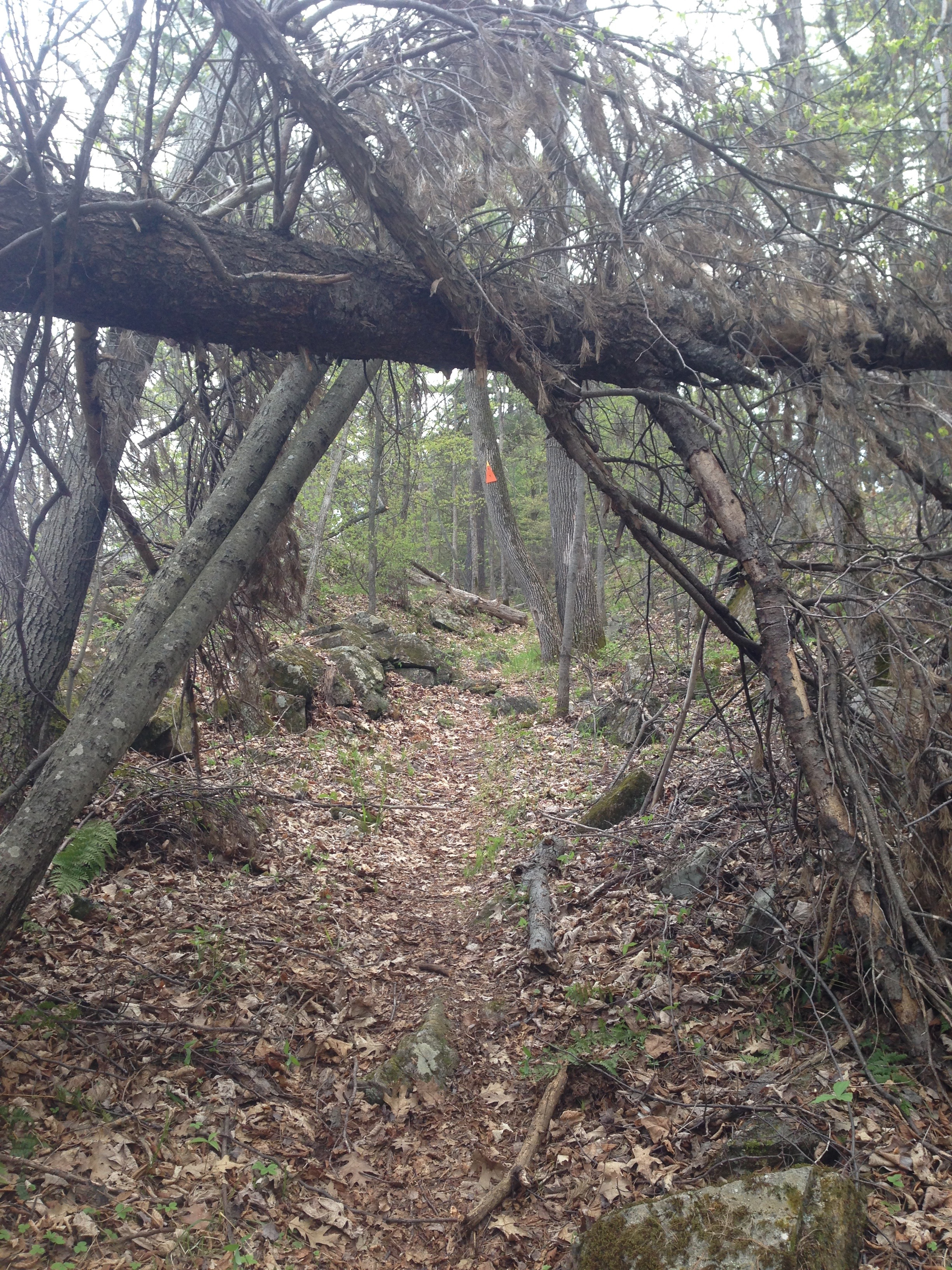
Rideau Trail in Gould Lake Conservation Area with southbound trail marker visible.

The Rideau Trail begins at Confederation Park in front of City Hall in Kingston. In Ottawa the trail ends at the foot of the Rideau Canal Ottawa Locks on the Ottawa River, within sight of Parliament Hill. The main trail is marked with orange triangular markers from Kingston to Ottawa. In the opposite direction the orange triangles have a yellow tip. Side trails sport blue triangles. The trail is maintained by the Rideau Trail Association (RTA), a non-profit organization which organizes both regular hikes along the trail (and other nearby trails) and work parties for maintenance. The association's registered trademark is an isosceles triangle. RTA membership is open to the public for an annual fee. RTA members organize regular group hikes on the Rideau Trail and in nearby trail systems.

The Rideau Trail is divided into three sections each administered by a local RTA section club. The section clubs are Kingston (Kingston to Lally Homestead in Murphys Point Provincial Park), Central (Lally Homestead to Rosedale outside Smiths Falls), and Ottawa (Rosedale to Parliament Hill). Each club awards RTA members who hike their entire section (at once or over multiple trips) an end-to-end badge. The RTA awards an overall end-to-end badge for completing the entire trail and a special edition for completing the entire trail during the months of January and February.

At certain points the Rideau Trail overlaps the K&P Rail Trail, Cataraqui Trail, and the Trans Canada Trail. The trail traverses the Frontenac Arch Biosphere Reserve.

== See also ==
- List of trails in Canada
