= Frederick Chase Capreol =

Canadian businessman and railway promoter

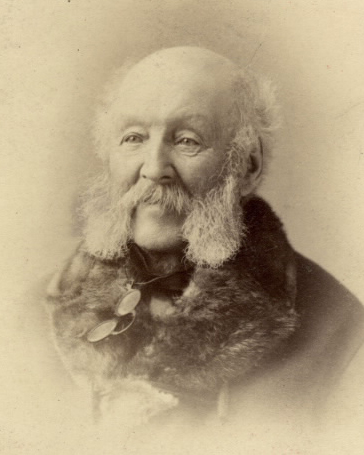
- Born: June 10, 1803; Bishop's Stortford, Hertfordshire, England
- Died: October 12, 1886 (aged 83); Toronto, Ontario, Canada

Frederick Chase Capreol (10 June 1803 – 12 October 1886) was an English-born Canadian businessman and railway promoter. He is noted for having promoted the construction of the Toronto, Simcoe & Lake Huron Union Railroad (renamed the Ontario, Simcoe and Huron Union Railroad in 1852 and subsequently renamed the Northern Railway of Canada following a reorganization in 1858).

== Arrival in Canada ==
Frederick Capreol first came to Canada to work with the North-west Fur Company in Montreal. He lived here for two years and returned to England afterwards. He came back to Canada in 1833, this time settling in Toronto. In 1840 he conducted an auction room in Toronto, living with his family on the second floor. He operated this business for ten years, moving his family into a home in 1846. When Frederick Capreol left the auction room in 1850 he concluded his business there.

== Northern Railway of Canada ==
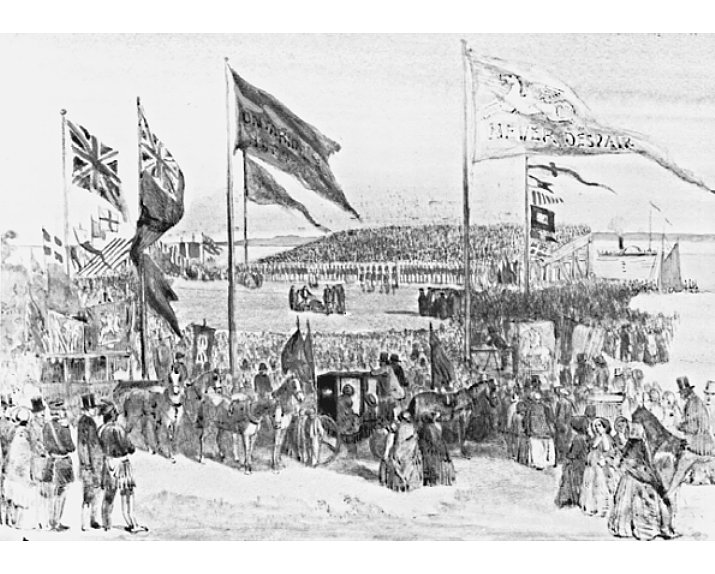
Lady Elgin breaks the sod for the Northern Railway of Canada, Toronto, 1851

It was in his home that he came up with the idea that would become the Northern Railway of Canada. The railway was originally known as the Ontario, Simcoe and Huron, referring to the three lakes the railway connected. The aim was to provide a portage route from the upper Great Lakes at Collingwood to Toronto, where a variety of other shipping routes were available. Finding financial support for the project was difficult, it was initially planned to be funded through a $2 million lottery, but this was deemed to be an underhanded way to make money. After raising bonds for the first 75 miles a bill was passed for the government to fund the remainder of the project. However, the bill was reserved for the Queen's assent. Frederick Capreol decided to go to England to acquire this and at this point people started calling him "Crazy Capreol." However, after seven weeks he came back with the assent and the first sod for the project was turned on 15 October 1851 in Toronto by Lady Elgin, wife of the Governor General Lord Elgin. Unfortunately, Capreol was dismissed as General Manager of the railway the previous day and he did not get the honour of presenting the spade to Lady Elgin. There was much unrest about this in Toronto, but no amount of petitions or outcry changed his position. By 1855 the mainline of the railway extended to Collingwood, Ontario, located in the southwest of Lake Huron's Georgian Bay.

This line was eventually incorporated into the Grand Trunk Railway, which subsequently became part of the Canadian National Railway.

== After the Railway ==
A later project Capreol had was to connect Lake Huron and Ontario with the construction of a canal. The project was named the, "Lake Huron and Ontario Ship Canal." Ground was broken September 17, 1866 and company offices were established in Toronto. Despite great enthusiasm the project was never carried through to completion.

== Legacy ==
The township of Capreol, in Northern Ontario was named in his honour, by the Government of Ontario. The town of Capreol, originally a Canadian Northern Railways divisional point, was named for the township in which it is located.
