= K&P Rail Trail =

Rail trail in Ontario, Canada

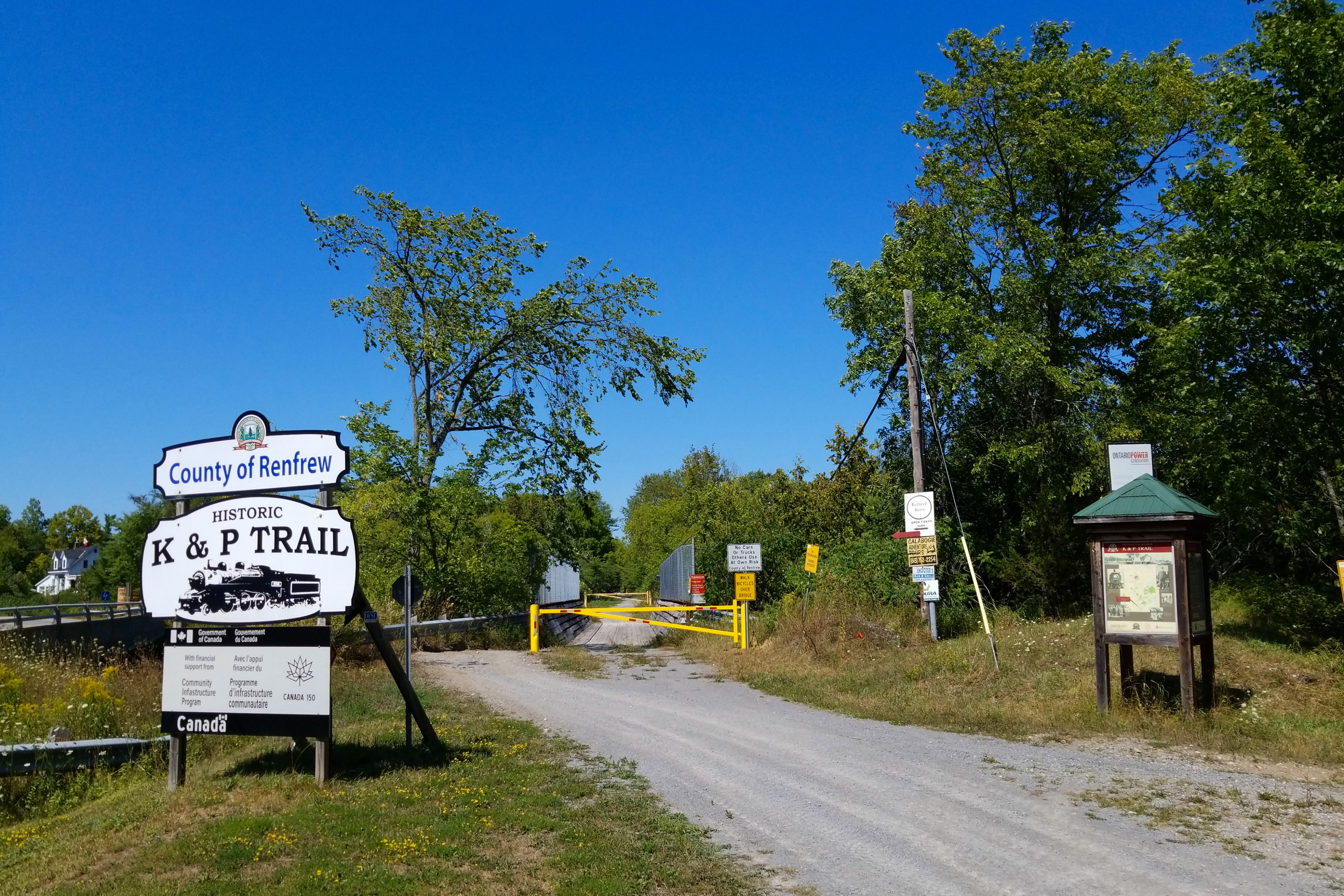
The southern end of the third section (the northern part) of the K&P trail in Calabogie

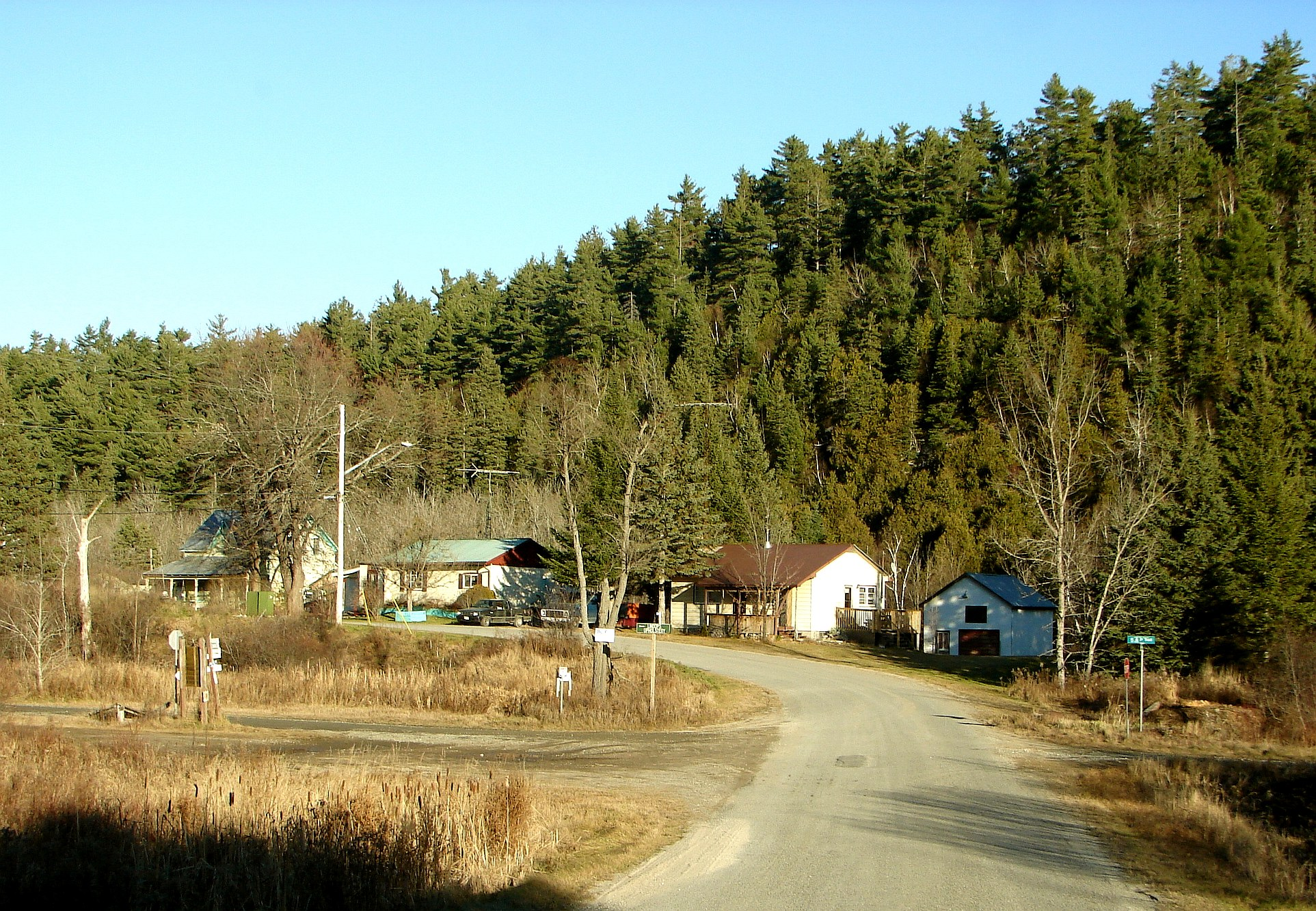
The K&P Trail crossing County Road 16 in Lavant Station.

The K&P Trail is a recreational trail that runs along the old Kingston and Pembroke Railway (K&P) bed in Ontario, Canada.

The trail currently consists of several unconnected sections between Kingston and Renfrew:

- The southern section of the trail starts in Kingston just east of Sydenham Road and Highway 401 at Little Cataraqui Creek and runs to Tichborne, a total of approximately 55 kilometres (34 mi). This section of the trail primarily parallels Highway 38 and runs through rural Kingston, South Frontenac Township and Central Frontenac Township. The railbed is owned by the City of Kingston and the County of Frontenac. The southern part of this section is primarily though farmland, with wooded areas dominating further north. Communities on the route include Harrowsmith and Verona. Parts of the trail are shared with the Rideau Trail and the Cataraqui Trail. Frontenac County is working to develop the trail up to Sharbot Lake.
- The middle section of the trail runs from Wilbur to Barryvale. This section runs through Lanark Highlands and Greater Madawaska. This section is primarily through relatively untouched wooded areas and is 32 kilometres (20 mi) long.
- The northern section of the trail runs from Calabogie to Renfrew in Renfrew County. This section is approximately 21 kilometres (13 mi) long.

== History ==
The K&P railway was abandoned by its owner, the Canadian Pacific Railway, between 1962 and 1986, and ran from Kingston to Renfrew.

== See also ==
- List of trails in Canada
