= Georgian Trail =

The Georgian Trail is a 34-kilometre (21 mi) multi-use recreational trail in Grey County, Ontario, Canada. Following the route of the former North Grey Railway, the trail extends from Collingwood to Meaford along the southern shoreline of Georgian Bay, passing through the Town of The Blue Mountains. The trail opened in 1989. The Georgian Trail is used year-round for walking, cycling, running, cross-country skiing, and snowshoeing. The trail is maintained through partnerships between local municipalities and trail organizations.

== History ==
The Georgian Trail follows the route of the former North Grey Railway, which was incorporated in 1871 as a branch of the Northern Railway of Canada to connect Collingwood with Meaford. Construction progressed through 1871 and 1872, with the line opening to Meaford on November 20, 1872. The North Grey Railway was developed to provide rail service between Collingwood and Meaford, connecting communities along the southern shore of Georgian Bay. Before the railway was completed, the North Grey Railway became part of the Toronto, Simcoe and Muskoka Junction Railway. The railway became part of the Canadian National Railway in 1923.

Rail operations along the corridor continued until 1984, when the line was then abandoned. The former railway right-of-way was subsequently converted into a recreational trail, and the Georgian Trail officially opened in 1989. Today, the 34-kilometre trail preserves much of the historic railway alignment and retains several bridges and other features associated with the former North Grey Railway. Along the trail, the restored Craigleith Station operates as a museum dedicated to the history of the railway and the communities it served along southern Georgian Bay.

== Route ==
The trail begins in Collingwood and follows the shoreline of Georgian Bay westward through the Town of The Blue Mountains before terminating in Meaford. Along its route, it passes wetlands, forests, agricultural lands, and residential communities, while offering views of Georgian Bay and the Niagara Escarpment. The trail has approximately 30 access points, with parking available in Collingwood, Thornbury, Meaford, and at various roadside locations.

== Recreation ==
The Georgian Trail is a year-round recreational trail used for walking, hiking, cycling, jogging, cross-country skiing, and snowshoeing. The crushed limestone and hardpacked soil surface is generally level because it follows a former railway grade, making it suitable for a variety of recreational users. The trail is also used for birdwatching and nature observation due to its proximity to wetlands and shoreline habitats.

== See also ==
- List of trails in Canada
