= Northern Railway of Canada =

Defunct railway in Ontario

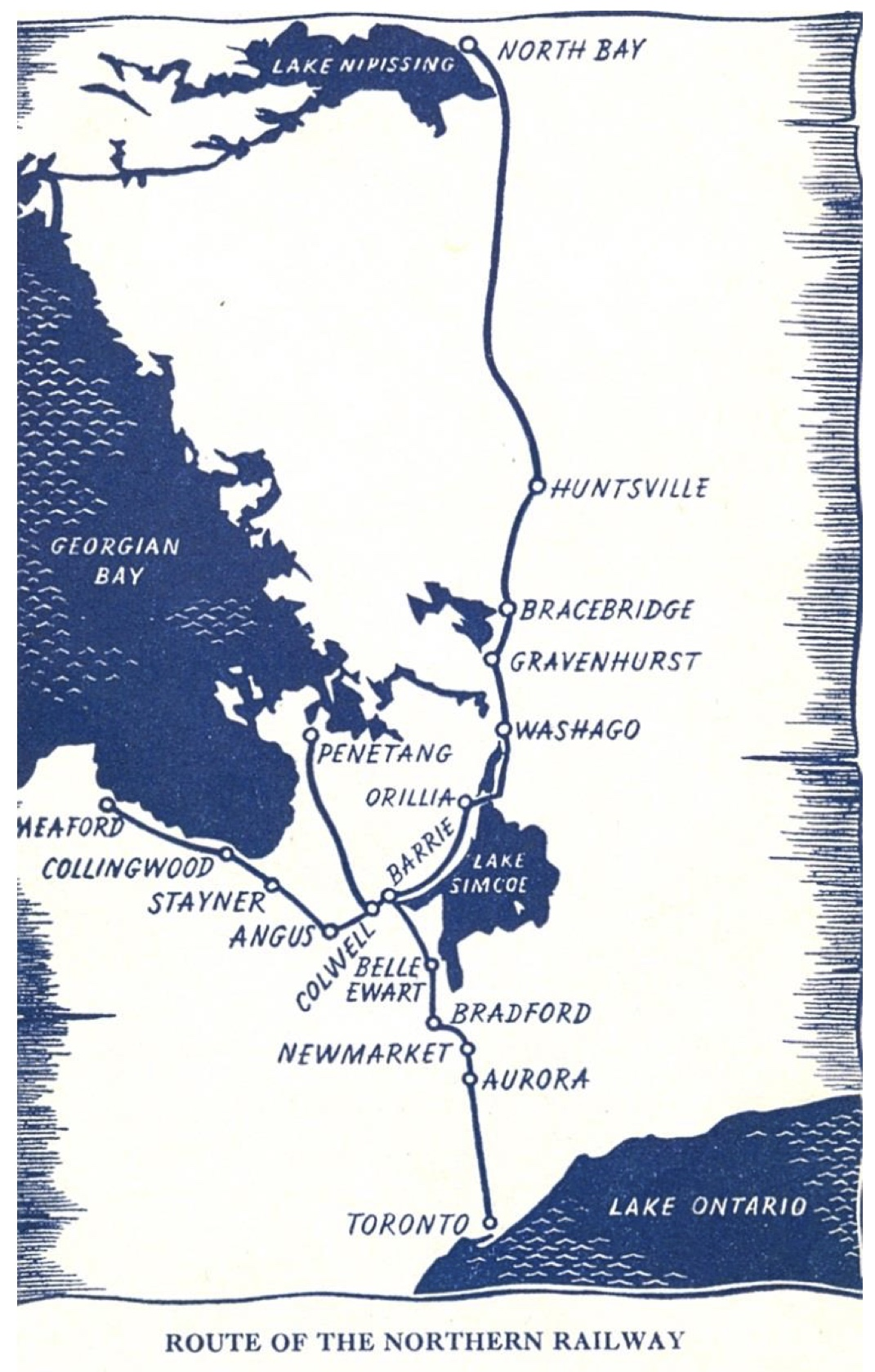
- A map showing the route at its maximum extent in the late 1800s. The Toronto–Barrie and Washago–North Bay sections remain in service.

The Northern Railway of Canada was a railway in the province of Ontario, Canada. It was the first steam railway to enter service in what was then known as Upper Canada. It was eventually acquired by the Grand Trunk Railway, and is therefore a predecessor to the modern Canadian National Railway (CNR). Several sections of the line are still used by CNR, GO Transit and the Ontario Northland Railway.

First known as the Toronto, Simcoe and Huron Railway, and then the Ontario, Simcoe and Huron Railway, the aim was to provide a portage route from the upper Great Lakes at Collingwood to Toronto. The plan for the railway was largely executed by Frederick Chase Capreol who was fired as manager of the company the day before the ground broke. Financial difficulties and a government bailout led to a reorganization of the company as the Northern Railway of Canada in 1859. The line saw three major expansions; North Grey Railway extended the original mainline to Meaford, the North Simcoe Railway ran to the port town of Penetanguishene, and the Muskoka Branch ran northeast to Gravenhurst. This last expansion would be the starting point for the Northern and Pacific Junction Railway, connecting to the Canadian Pacific Railway mainline outside of North Bay. In 1887, the Grand Trunk Railway (GTR) gained a controlling interest, and the takeover was formalized in January 1888.

The line primarily served the port towns on Georgian Bay, where it faced increasing competition over the years. A combination of factors, including the Great Depression and the opening of a wider Welland Canal led to decreased use of the ports, and a fall in traffic. The closure of Collingwood Shipbuilding in 1986 led to the abandonment of the sections in Collingwood and to the west. The line is intact from Barrie all the way to Toronto's Union Station, with the section between Toronto and Barrie used by GO Transit as the Barrie line. The Muskoka Junction has been combined with the Ontario Northland Railway to form CNR's mainline in the area north of Orillia. Section west of Collingwood now form the Georgian Trail. The Meaford station was dismantled after 1960 and two stations along this section of the line remain:

- Craigleith Station - restored and now a museum
- Thornbury Station - now a retail store on Highway 26

Several sections of the line have been turned over to rail trail use. The section of the mainline from the western side of Collingwood to Meaford is now the high-quality 34 kilometres (21 miles) Georgian Trail, which is being expanded towards Owen Sound as the Tom Thomson Trail. Sections from Collingwood to Stayner have a trail running beside them. (Note: As of 2014 the condition of the rails through Stayner suggest this section of the line has been unused for some time. The line in this area is significantly rusted and heavily overgrown.) The North Simcoe Railway now forms the 22.5 kilometres (14.0 mi) Tiny Beaches Trail with sections south of this also in use.

== History ==
=== Construction ===
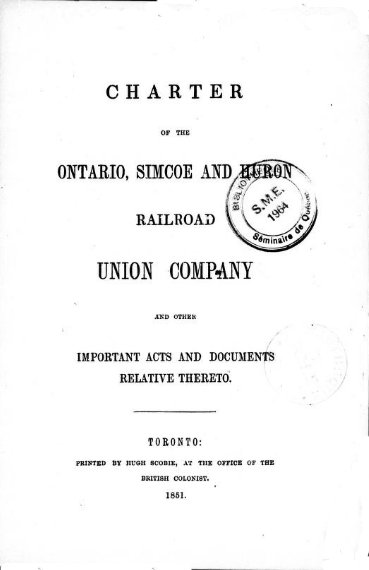
Cover of the Act of the Province of Canada chartering the Ontario, Simcoe and Huron Railroad Union Company, 1851

Talk about a line from Toronto to the upper Great Lakes has been recorded to as early as 1834, but no serious effort was taken until 1848 when Frederick Chase Capreol announced he was going to build a line to the Collingwood area under the name Toronto, Simcoe and Huron Railroad Union Company. He suggested a novel method to raise the funds for construction, using a $2 million lottery. The proposition was considered so scandalous it was put to a referendum and defeated. With the passage of the Railway Guarantee Act in 1849, Capreol joined forces with Charles Albert Berczy and chartered the company on August 29th, 1849, now having to raise conventional bonds for the first 75 miles (121 km), from which point government funding would be available.

Continued difficulties delayed construction, during which time the company re-chartered as the Ontario, Simcoe and Huron Union Railroad in 1850. Capreol was fired as manager two days before the official sod turning, which was carried out on 15 October 1851 by Lady Elgin. The occasion was marked with a parade, to which an estimated 20,000 people attended of a total population of the city of only 31,000. Sandford Fleming took the sod and preserved it for history. A party later that night at St. Lawrence Hall was capped by a performance by Jenny Lind organized by P. T. Barnum.

In February 1853, the railway commissioned the construction of the first locomotive built in any British colony. Early construction required the line to pass over the Oak Ridges Moraine, and it was not until 16 May 1853 that the first train reached Machell's Corners, today's Aurora, Ontario. Work north of there was much more rapid; the line reached Allandale in Barrie later in 1853, and Collingwood in 1855. Early traffic was dominated by agricultural products, earning it the nickname "Oats, Straw, and Hay". (Note: Based on the original acronym for Ontario, Simcoe and Huron.) A a short spur at Lefroy to Belle Ewart provided ice and lumber shipment to Toronto from docks on Lake Simcoe.

=== Northern Railway ===
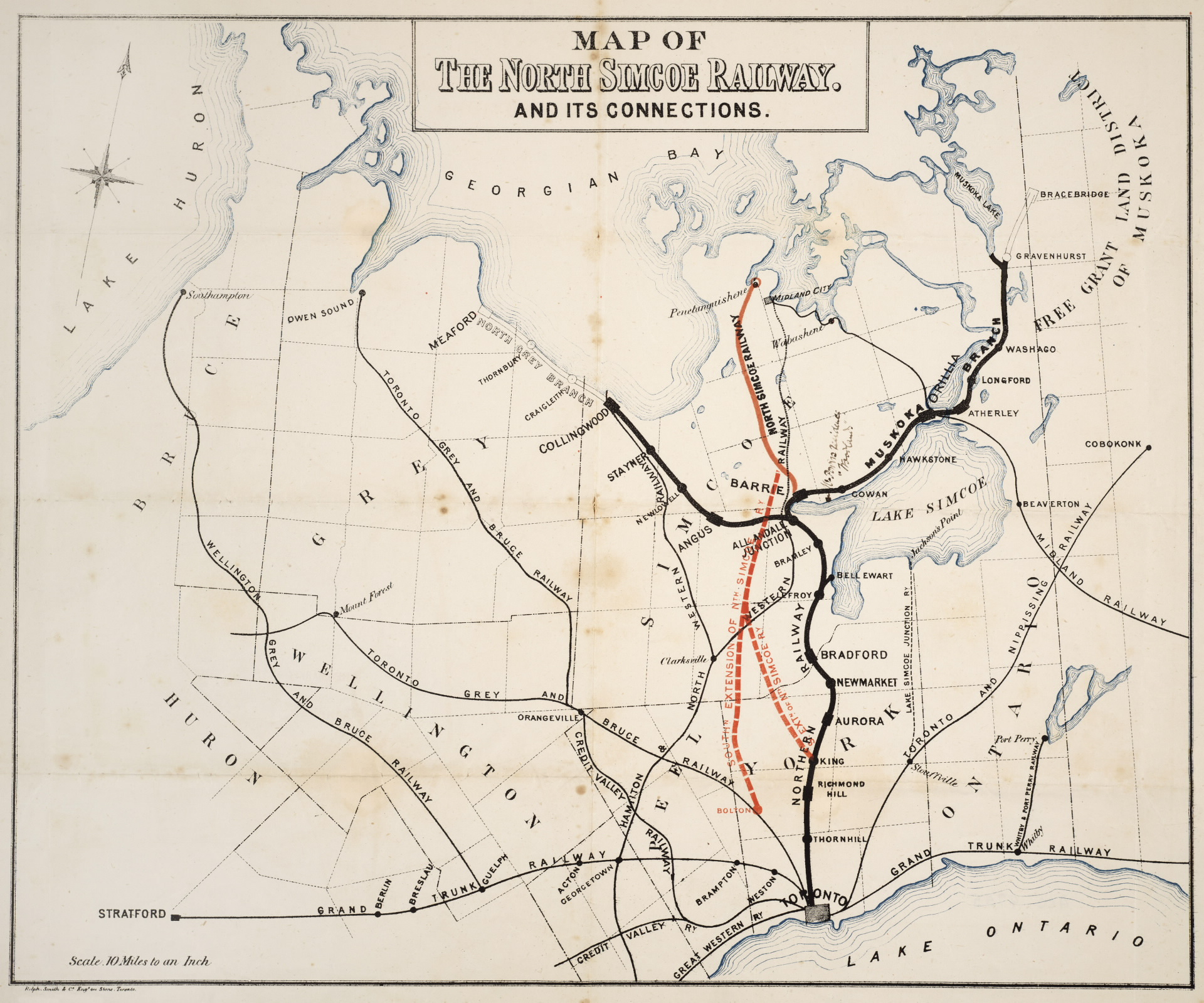
Map of the Northern and its various expansions, circa 1877.

In spite of reasonable volumes of traffic the line was never very profitable, and by 1858, the company was in financial difficulty. Frederick William Cumberland agreed to take control of the railway, after reorganizing as the Northern Railway Company of Canada in August 1858. Cumberland focused on profitability, cutting any train that didn't pay for itself, strongly resisting any expansion plans, and selling off their small fleet of ships operating on the Great Lakes.

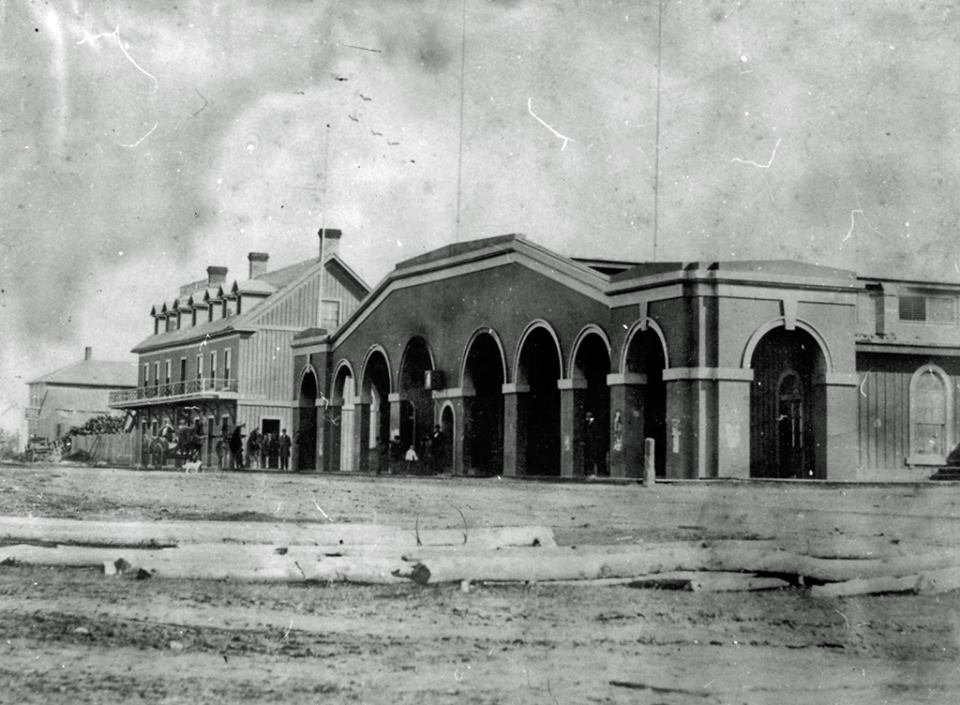
View of the station in Collingwood, before the tracks were laid to the building. It burned down in 1873.

This resistance to expansion would ultimately backfire; in 1864 the company was approached by businessmen from Grey and Bruce counties about building a line through their burgeoning agricultural areas. Cumberland refused, stating that traffic would be too low. This left an opening for the formation of the Toronto, Grey and Bruce Railway (TG&B), which began construction toward Owen Sound in the spring of 1869.

Faced with their first real competition, the Northern chartered their own North Grey Railway on 15 February 1871, with plans to extend out of Collingwood to Meaford and authority to continue to Owen Sound. Construction between Collingwood and Meaford took place over the flat terrain between the Niagara Escarpment and the southern shore of Georgian Bay, and the line was completed on 1 April 1872. However, the expansion to Owen Sound was never completed; a combination of much more difficult terrain west of Meaford, the impending arrival of the TG&B, and demand for other expansions that were considered more important.

The company had continually been at odds with a number of groups in Simcoe County, especially those in Barrie who continually pushed for an expansion of the line into the downtown area. This was eventually solved through the late 1869 formation of the Toronto, Simcoe and Muskoka Junction Railway, or Muskoka Branch, which branched off at the Allendale station and ran north-east to Orillia and then on to Lake Muskoka outside Gravenhurst. The line was officially absorbed into the Northern in 1875.

Upset with the Northern remained, and demand for additional shipping routes on the Lakes led to intense building through the entire area. Businessmen in Hamilton took the opportunity to plan a second line to Barrie as the Hamilton and North-Western Railway (H&NW), with their proposed line passing through several towns along the way. The Northern countered with the suggestion for a South Simcoe Junction Railway, splitting off the existing line at King City or Bolton, and then meeting the Northern again west of Barrie and continuing on to Penetanguishene as the North Simcoe Railway.

Comparing the two, business interests in Simcoe County and towns along the route demanded additional work from both companies. The H&NW finally agreed to run a branch line to Collingwood, splitting off the mainline some distance west of Newmarket, and added optional plans for an extension north from Barrie to Midland. Bonuses from Simcoe County totalling $300,000 were given to the H&NW, along with about $150,000 from towns along the route, some indication of the area's upset with the Northern. The line reached Barrie in 1877 and Collingwood in mid-1879. The H&NW never completed their northern expansion to Midland.

The Northern went ahead with one portion of their own expansion plans, dropping plans for the line from King City and instead splitting off west of Barrie to run north to Penetanguishene as the North Simcoe Railway. Construction began in January 1878.

=== Re-gauging, merger, buyout ===
In 1881, the entire line was re-gauged in sections. The entire mainline to Gravenhurst was converted to standard gauge in a single day on 9 July 1881. Work gangs were located all along the line waiting for the 7:45 AM mail train leaving Toronto, which carried a large card reading "Last Train". The crews moved the rails as soon as the train passed them, having already half driven the spikes.

The cost of construction, general financial difficulties of the era, and the enormous cost of an expansion to North Bay led the Northern and H&NW to organize a new joint management agreement, forming the Northern and North Western Railway in June 1879. This provided the funding and income needed to begin construction of the Northern and Pacific Junction Railway, which ran between Gravenhurst and Nipissing. This reached the Canadian Pacific Railway transcontinental lines at North Bay in 1886.

The Northern Railway was purchased by Grand Trunk Railway in 1888, and through its amalgamation, became part of the Canadian National Railway in 1923. CNR operated the mainline as the CN Newmarket Subdivision, selling off the branches to the west, and pulling up the section between Barrie and Orillia. It is now the Barrie line after its purchase by Metrolinx.

== Locomotives ==
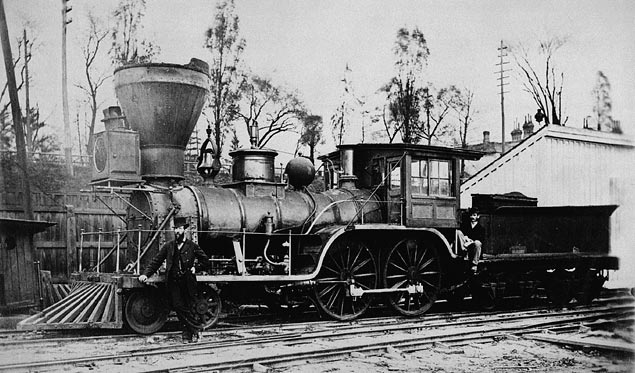
Lady Elgin, Engine No. 1 of the Ontario, Simcoe and Huron Union Railroad.

The first locomotive of the Ontario, Simcoe and Huron Union Railroad was named Lady Elgin and built in Portland, Maine. It was named for Mary Lambton, second wife of James Bruce, 8th Earl of Elgin, the 42nd Governor General of Canada (1847–1854); she had also lifted a ceremonial silver spade for the sod-turning ceremony of the construction of the railway at Front Street and Simcoe Street on 15 October 1851. Because of the high customs duties and shipping costs for the locomotive, executives of the Ontario, Simcoe and Huron Union Railroad decided that subsequent locomotives would be built in Ontario.

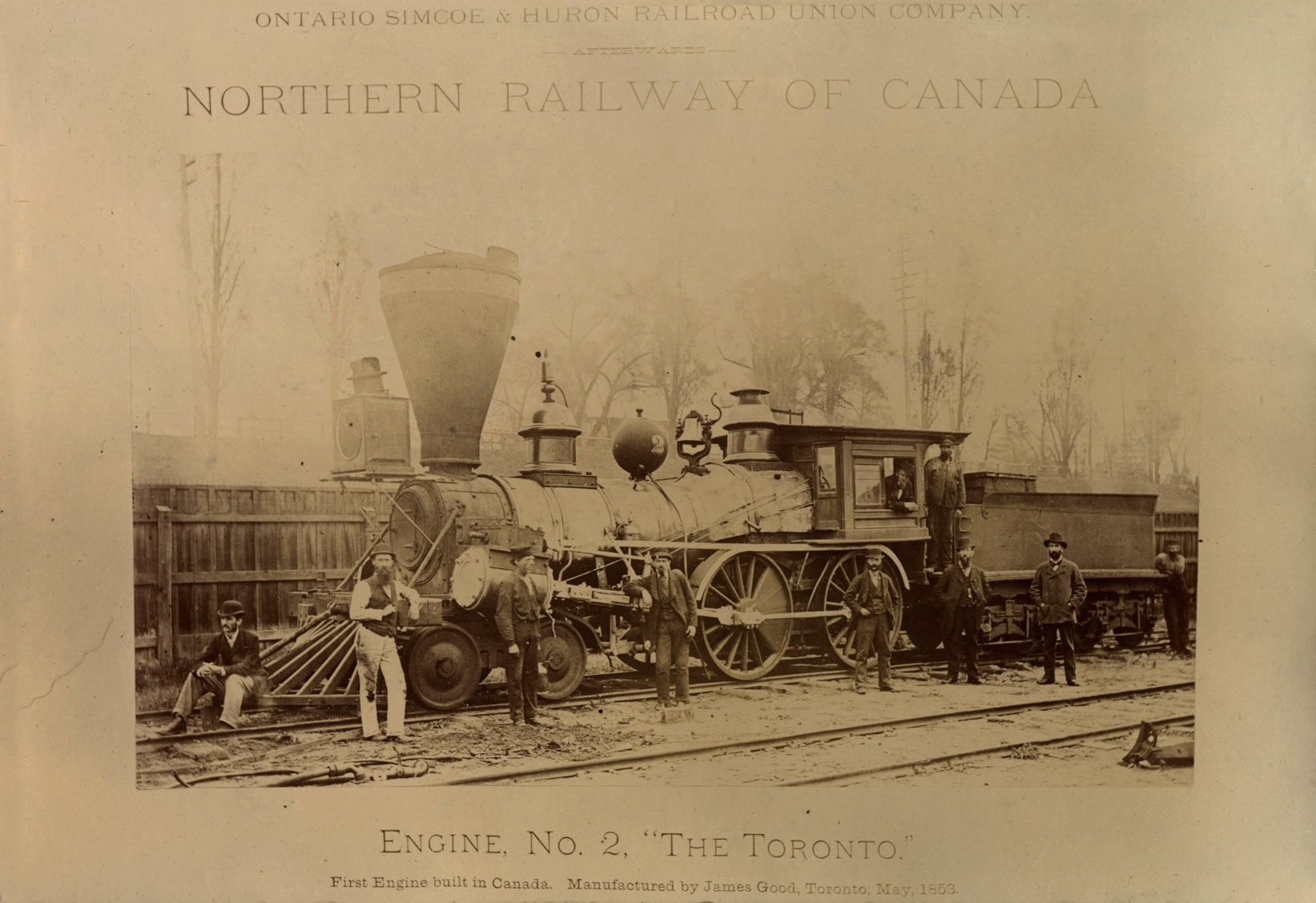
Engine No. 2, The Toronto, seen in 1881 in Toronto.

The James Good foundry Toronto Locomotive Works, located at the corner of Queen and Yonge Street, would manufacture nine locomotives for the Ontario, Simcoe and Huron railway at an average cost of $5000. The first of these was named Toronto, built in its namesake city and the first locomotive built in Canada or in any colony of the British Empire. Commissioned in February 1853, its construction was completed by 16 April. Over five days, it was rolled along temporary wooden rails on Queen Street and York Street, and on 26 April it was lifted onto the new OSH railway tracks on Front Street. Torontonians would monitor the locomotive's progress from the foundry to the Front Street tracks, and the event was the subject of a later artistic rendering. Its first duty was three weeks later, transporting passengers and freight between the city of Toronto and the community of Machell's Corner, now known as Aurora. This first duty is commemorated by a plaque installed in 1953 at Union Station in Toronto. The Toronto and other locomotives were scrapped after Canadian railways converted from the 5'6" track gauge to the 4'8 1/2" American standard gauge starting in the 1870s.

== Finances ==
The railway earned revenues from passenger, freight, postal, and sundry other sources. The total earnings for 1 January to 7 July 1860 were $166,108.64, and for 1 January to 6 July 1861 were $210,177.46.

Year	Week	Passenger	Freight	Postal and sundry	Total
1860	ending 14 April				7012.86
1860	ending 19 May				8645.63
1860	ending 7 July				6824.88
1860	ending 14 July				6409.73
1860	ending 8 August				6564
1861	ending 13 April				8953.38
1861	ending 18 May				8724.89
1861	ending 6 July	1810.92	7168.35	84.72	9064.00
1861	ending 13 July	1728.20	7412.90	81.66	9222.81
1861	ending 8 August				9224

== Recognition of the Ontario, Simcoe & Huron Railway ==
In 2010, the Ontario, Simcoe and Huron Railway was inducted to the North America Railway Hall of Fame. The OS&HR was recognized for its contribution to railroading as a "Community, Business, Government or Organization" in the "National" category (pertaining specifically to the area in and around St. Thomas, Ontario.)

== See also ==
- History of rail transport in Canada
