= Central Frontenac =

- Township (lower-tier)
- Township of Central Frontenac
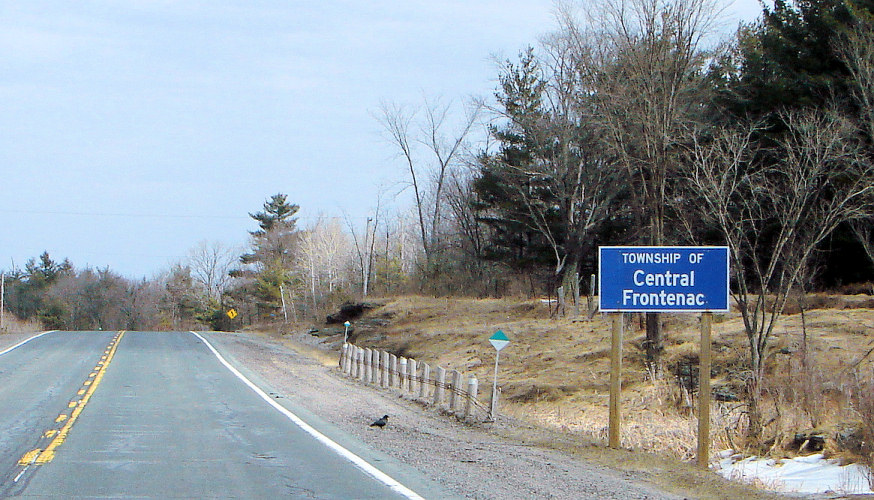

- Location within Southern Ontario
- Coordinates: 44°43′05″N 76°49′50″W
- Country: Canada
- Province: Ontario
- County: Frontenac
- Incorporated: 1998

Government
  - Type: Township
  - Mayor: Frances Smith
  - Federal riding: Lanark—Frontenac
  - Provincial riding: Lanark—Frontenac—Kingston

Area
  - Land: 991.41 km^{2} (382.79 sq mi)

Population (2021)
  - Total: 4,892
  - Density: 4.9/km^{2} (13/sq mi)
- Time zone: UTC−05:00 (EST)
  - Summer (DST): UTC−04:00 (EDT)
- Postal Code: K0H
- Area codes: 613, 343, 753
- Website: Official website

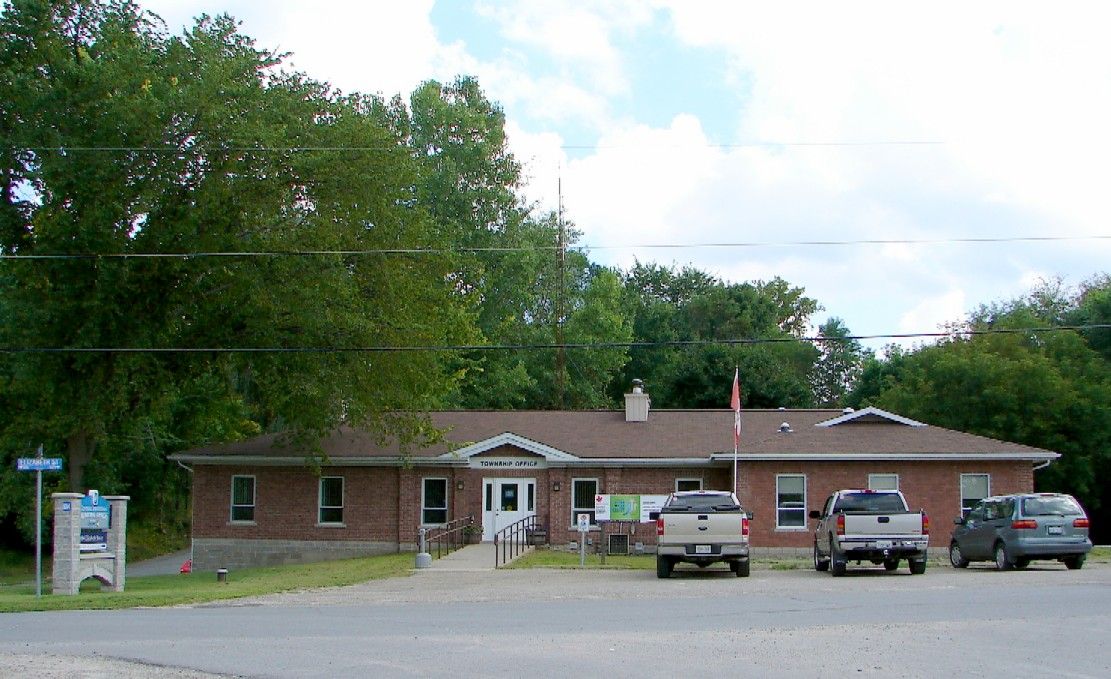
Municipal office in Sharbot Lake

Central Frontenac is a township in eastern Ontario, Canada, in the County of Frontenac.

Central Frontenac was created on January 1, 1998, through an amalgamation of the Townships of Hinchinbrooke, Kennebec, Olden, and Oso.

== Communities ==
There are 28 communities:

- Arden
- Ardendale
- Bordenwood
- Burke Settlement
- Clarendon Station 44°52′26″N 76°41′46″W
- Cole Lake
- Crow Lake
- Echo
- Elm Tree
- Godfrey
- Henderson 44°46′43″N 76°59′28″W
- Kirk Cove 44°47′35″N 76°59′02″W
- Long Lake 44°41′24″N 76°45′47″W
- McLean 44°39′14″N 76°50′02″W
- Mountain Grove 44°44′02″N 76°50′38″W
- Oak Flats 44°32′53″N 76°44′28″W
- Oconto 44°43′16″N 76°40′30″W
- Oso 44°49′08″N 76°41′02″W
- Parham
- Piccadilly 44°43′59″N 76°56′53″W
- Ronaldson 44°40′59″N 77°01′59″W
- Seouls Corners 44°46′55″N 76°48′00″W
- Sharbot Lake
- Tichborne
- Wagarville 44°38′24″N 76°48′11″W
- Wilkinson 44°31′59″N 76°48′43″W
- Zealand 44°50′02″N 76°37′12″W

== Demographics ==
In the 2021 Census of Population conducted by Statistics Canada, Central Frontenac had a population of 4,892 living in 2,177 of its 3,618 total private dwellings, a change of 11.9% from its 2016 population of 4,373. With a land area of 991.41 km^{2} (382.79 sq mi), it had a population density of 4.9/km^{2} (12.8/sq mi) in 2021.

Canada census – Central Frontenac community profile

	2021	2016	2011
Population	4,892 (+11.9% from 2016)	4,373 (-4.0% from 2011)	4,556 (-2.3% from 2006)
Land area	991.41 km^{2} (382.79 sq mi)	1,025.2 km^{2} (395.8 sq mi)	1,025.17 km^{2} (395.82 sq mi)
Population density	4.9/km^{2} (13/sq mi)	4.3/km^{2} (11/sq mi)	4.4/km^{2} (11/sq mi)
Median age	55.6 (M: 55.6, F: 56.0)	53.5 (M: 52.7, F: 54.4)	50.1 (M: 49.8, F: 50.4)
Private dwellings	3,618 (total) 2,177 (occupied)	3,726 (total)	3,536 (total)
Median household income	$70,000	$56,550

References: 2021 2016 2011

Mother tongue (2021):

- English as first language: 95.1%
- French as first language: 1.5%
- English and French as first language: 0.3%
- Other as first language: 2.8%

Historical census populations – Central Frontenac
Year	Pop.	±%
1996	4,615	—
2001	4,557	−1.3%
2006	4,665	+2.4%
2011	4,556	−2.3%
2016	4,373	−4.0%
2021	4,892	+11.9%
Population counts are not adjusted for boundary changes. Source: Statistics Canada

== Transportation ==
The main road is Highway 7 which runs through the entire township from east to west. Central Frontenac Road 38 intersects Highway 7 at Sharbot Lake and runs south to South Frontenac Township, providing connectivity with Kingston.

The route of the former Kingston and Pembroke Railway runs through the township, and has been converted into the K&P Rail Trail.

== Crime ==
On June 7, 2020, a gunman opened fire on his neighbours after lighting a building on fire in Parham. The fire spread to the adjacent historic century-old St. James Anglican church, destroying both buildings. One person was injured. The gunman was charged with attempted murder, arson and firearms-related charges.

== Education ==
Central Frontenac, along with South Frontenac, North Frontenac and the Frontenac Islands, send students to schools part of the Limestone District School Board, based in neighboring Kingston.

== See also ==
- List of townships in Ontario
