= Sharbot Lake =

- Suburban Community; Unincorporated area
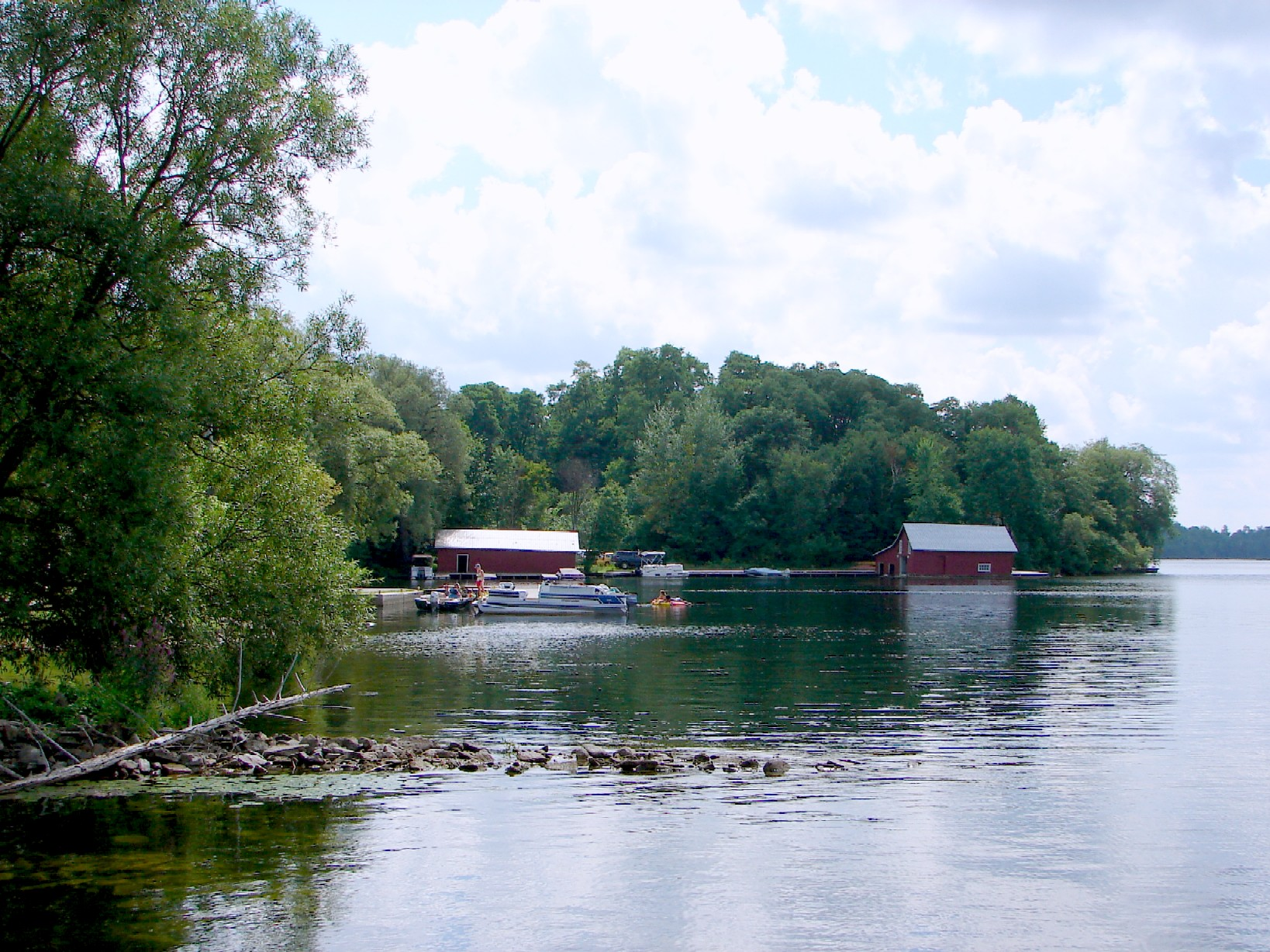

- Location in southern Ontario
- Coordinates: 44°46′26″N 76°41′14″W
- Country: Canada
- Province: Ontario
- County: Frontenac
- Municipality: Central Frontenac
- Elevation: 195 m (640 ft)
- Time zone: UTC-5 (Eastern Time Zone)
  - Summer (DST): UTC-4 (Eastern Time Zone)
- Postal Code: K0H 2P0
- Area codes: 613, 343, 753
- Website: https://www.sharbotlake.com/

Sharbot Lake is a suburban community and unincorporated area in the municipality of Central Frontenac, Frontenac County in Eastern Ontario, Canada. Named after the Sharbot family, who were local residents, it appeared in Lovell's Gazetteer in 1874. It is part of the Land O'Lakes Tourist Region and is located on the eponymous Sharbot Lake.

== Recreation ==
The community is surrounded by many lakes that are used for outdoor recreation. The nearby Sharbot Lake Provincial Park has hiking trails, camp sites, and a boat launch into Sharbot Lake.

== Local services ==
Sharbot Lake has tourist-oriented shops and accommodations. Also in the village are a public beach and park, a pharmacy, grocery, bank, medical clinic, law office, real estate services, and public library (part of the Kingston Frontenac Public Library system). The local post office services the village with lock boxes, and rural routes (RR2 Sharbot Lake, RR1 Clarendon Station and RR1 Ompah).

== Transportation ==
Sharbot Lake is accessible via Ontario Highway 38 and Ontario Highway 7 (the latter part of the Trans-Canada Highway in the area). It was once an important stop on the Kingston and Pembroke Railway, the rail bed of which has become the multi-use K&P Rail Trail and part of the Trans Canada Trail.

== Annual events ==
Sharbot Lake hosts:

- an annual triathlon, with a 1.5 km swim, 40 km cycle and a 10 km run.
- the Arts by The Lake art festival in August
- an annual Heritage Festival in February
- annual Snowmobile races

Olympic gold medalist Simon Whitfield got his start in the triathlon by participating in Sharbot Lake's annual "Kids Of Steel" event for youth.
