= Kingston and Pembroke Railway =

Former railway in eastern Ontario, Canada

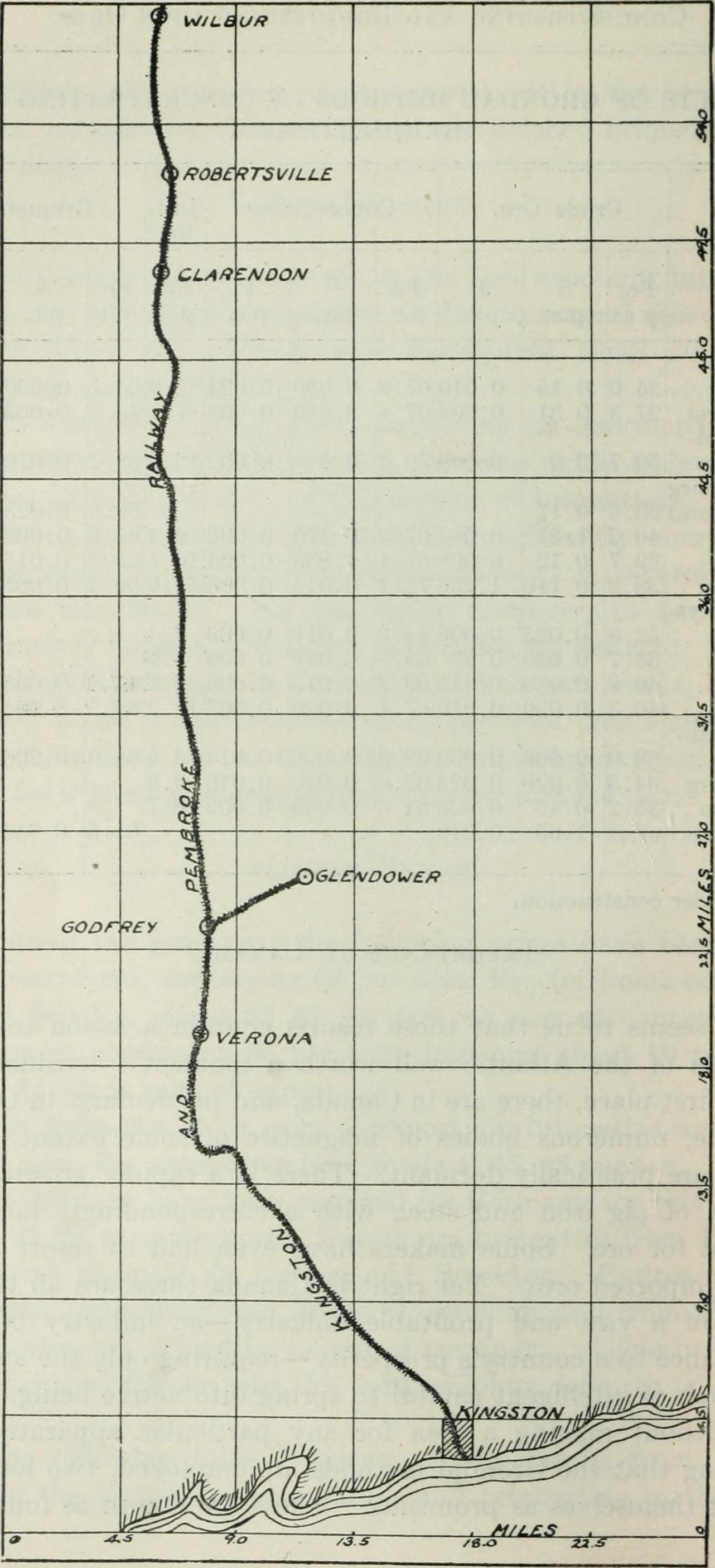
Railroad map of K&P from Kingston to Wilbur

The Kingston and Pembroke Railway (K&P) was a Canadian railway that operated in eastern Ontario. The railway was seen as a business opportunity which would support the lumber and mining industries, as well as the agricultural economy in eastern Ontario.

The K&P is affectionately remembered as the Kick and Push railroad.

== History ==
Incorporated in 1871, the K&P was intended to run from Kingston to Pembroke. By 1884, approximately 180 kilometres (110 mi) of mainline and sidings had been laid, reaching Renfrew. By this time the Canada Central Railway had already built a line from Renfrew to Pembroke, and it no longer made financial sense to continue. Thus the K&P was terminated at Renfrew.

Due to decreasing timber and mineral resources in the late 19th century, the company developed financial difficulties. The line was leased to the Canadian Pacific Railway (CPR) for 999 years in an agreement formalized in 1912. The CPR officially gained control of the K&P on January 1, 1913 and the K&P was no longer a legal entity. The line was gradually abandoned beginning in the 1950s, with the last operating section from Kingston to Tichborne (joining the CN and CP main lines) closing in 1986.

Part of the line has been converted to a rail trail known as the K&P Rail Trail. The Kingston Inner Station at 209 Ontario Street, originally the southern terminus of the line, is now a tourism information centre. The area opposite Kingston City Hall, once a large rail yard, is now Confederation Park and marina. A restored locomotive, the "Spirit of Sir John A.", sits behind the former station.

The K&P line had a roundhouse in Kingston, on outer Wellington Street. The roundhouse is now gone; the area now contains Ontario Health Insurance Plan offices. The turntable from the site was redeployed to Wakefield, Quebec.

== Stations ==
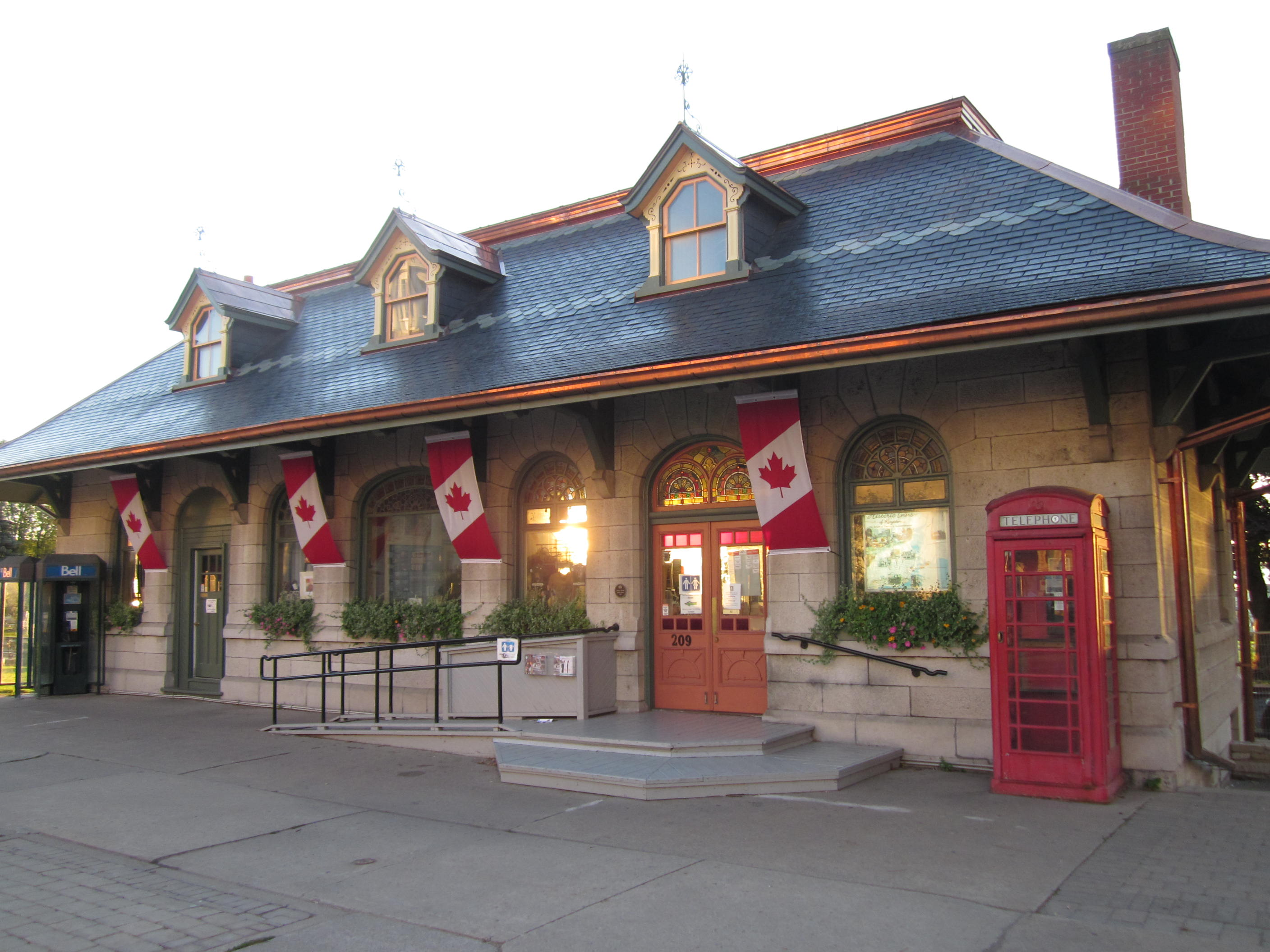
Kingston's Inner Station

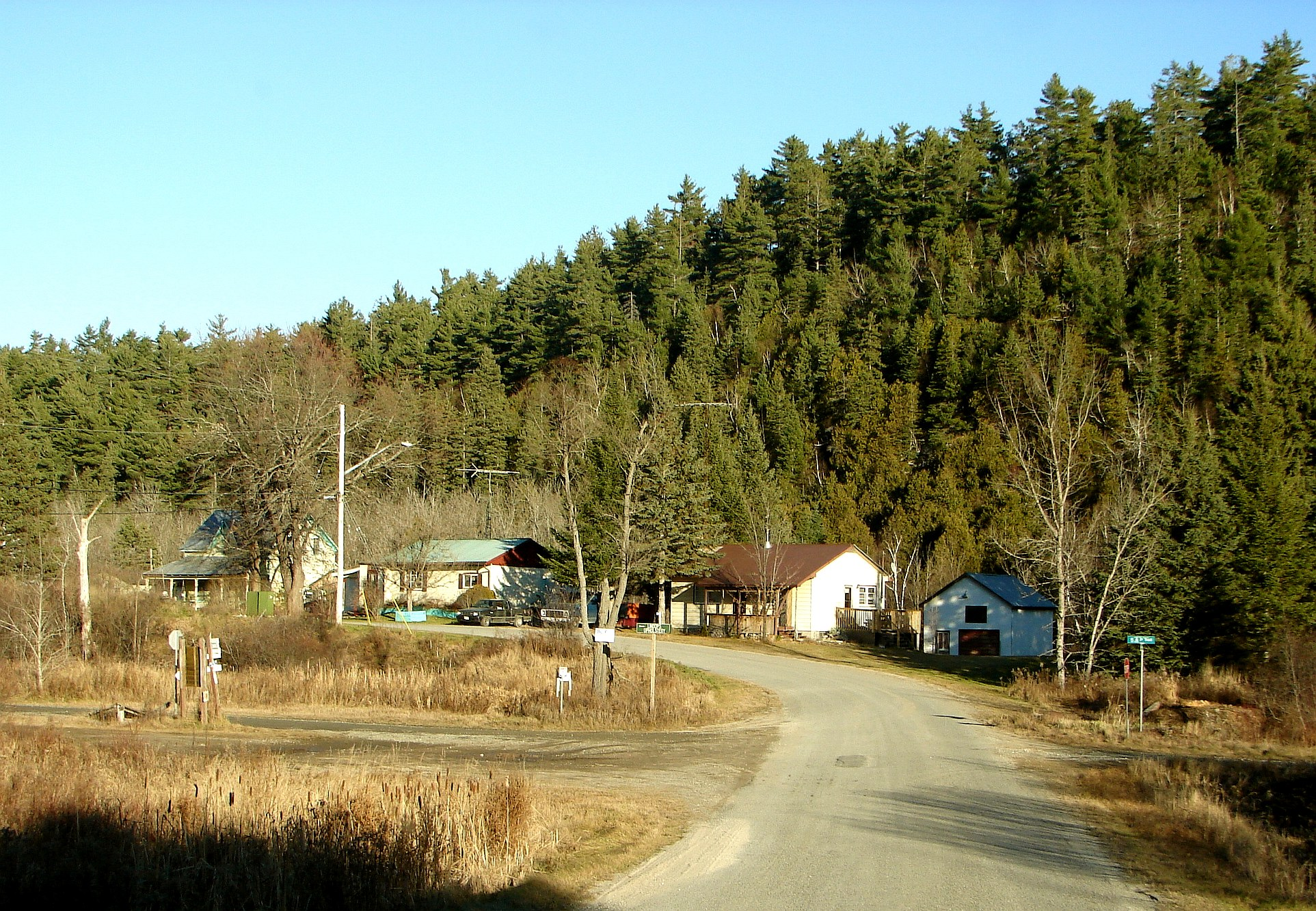
Railbed of the K&P at Lavant Station, now the K&P Rail Trail

This is a list of stations from north to south. This list will differ from others since some of the stations were known by different names, some stations were informal stops known only by local residents and train personnel, and some trains only travelled part of the route.

- Renfrew
- Opeongo (Ferguslea)
- Ashdad
- Calabogie
- Barryvale
- Flower
- Clyde Forks
- Folger
- Lavant
- Wilbur
- Snow Road
- Mississippi
- Robertsville
- Clarendon
- Oso
- Sharbot Lake
- Olden
- Tichborne
- Hinchinbrooke
- Godfrey
- Verona
- Hartington
- Harrowsmith
- Murvale
- Glenvale
- Kingston

=== Interchanges ===
- Canada Central Railway, Renfrew
- Canadian Pacific Railway, Sharbot Lake/Tichborne
- Canadian Northern Railway, Harrowsmith
- Grand Trunk Railway, Kingston

The K & P did not share facilities with Canadian National/Grand Trunk in Kingston; each operated separate passenger stations in the city.

CNoR (as successor to the former Bay of Quinte Railway) held running rights over a portion of the K & P line from Harrowsmith to Kingston.

== See also ==
- List of Ontario railways
- List of defunct Canadian railways
- Michael John O'Brien
