= Harrowsmith, Ontario =

Unincorporated community in Ontario, Canada

Coordinates: 44°24′19″N 76°39′53″W

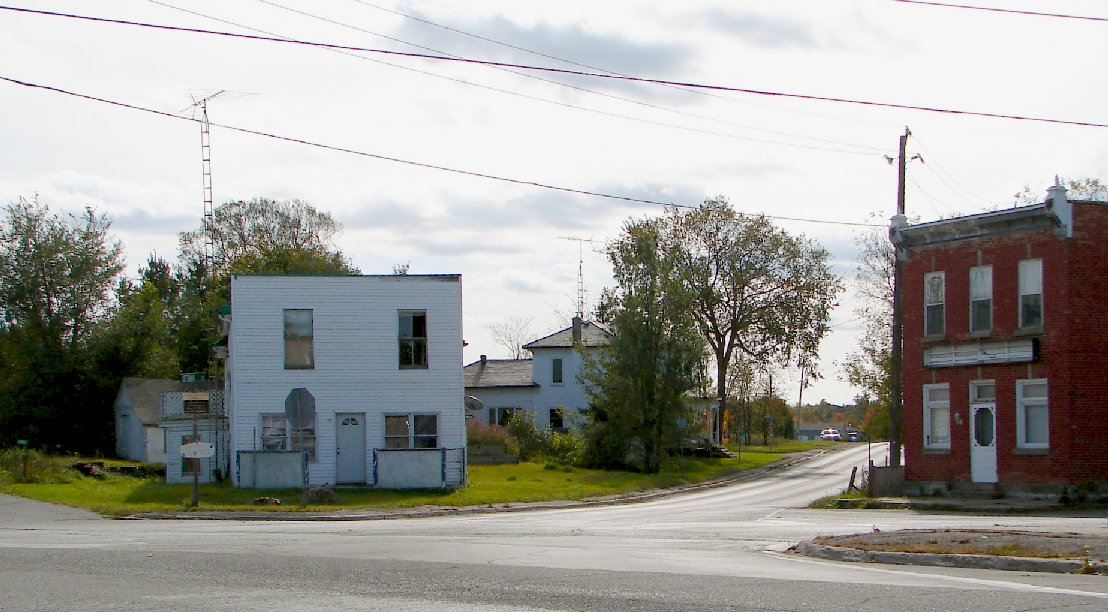
Harrowsmith

Harrowsmith is a community in South Frontenac, Ontario, Canada. Located north of Kingston, it was once noted for the cheddar cheese produced by the Harrowsmith Cheese Factory. As a farming village in an area resettled by many back-to-the-land emigrants from urban areas in the 1960s–1980s, the village gave its name to the country living magazine Harrowsmith.

The village was once the junction of the Bay of Quinte Railway and the Kingston and Pembroke Railway. These rail lines eventually came under Canadian National Railway (CN) and Canadian Pacific Railway (CP) ownership respectively. The Harrowsmith railway station had a livestock pen, facilitating the transportation of livestock by rail. Both lines saw eventual abandonment and conversion into rail trails known as the Cataraqui Trail and the K&P Rail Trail, which still meet each other at Harrowsmith as their railway predecessors did. Normally a quiet farming village, the inaugural Line Spike music festival was held in a hay field just east of the town in 2025, drawing thousands of attendees to the 2-day event that was headlined by Burton Cummings and Walk Off The Earth. The festival drew its name from the defunct railways next to which it occurred.

Harrowsmith is home to Centennial Park, a large park adjacent to Road 38 which includes soccer fields, baseball diamonds, play structures and hosts many community activities.
