= 33rd Medium Artillery Regiment, RCA =

- Active: 1866–1965
- Country: Canada
- Branch: Canadian Militia (1866–1940); Canadian Army (1940–1970)
- Type: Artillery
- Role: Field artillery
- Size: Two batteries
- Part of: Royal Regiment of Canadian Artillery
- Garrison/HQ: Cobourg, Ontario
- Mottos: Ubique (Latin for 'Everywhere'); Quo fas et gloria ducunt (Latin for 'Whither right and glory lead')
- March: Quick: "British Grenadiers"
- Engagements: First World War

The 33rd Medium Artillery Regiment, Royal Canadian Artillery was an artillery regiment of the Canadian Army Reserve based in Cobourg, Ontario. In 1965, the regiment was reduced to nil strength and placed on the Supplementary Order of Battle.

== Perpetuations ==
- 2nd Heavy Battery, CGA, CEF
- 146th Battalion, CEF

== Lineage ==
=== 33rd Medium Artillery Regiment, RCA ===
- Originated on 1 April 1946, in Cobourg, Ontario, as the 33rd Medium Regiment, RCA.
- Redesignated on 12 April 1960, as the 33rd Medium Artillery Regiment, RCA.
- Amalgamated on 6 July 1960, with the 22nd Independent Medium Artillery Battery, RCA, with no change in name.
- Reduced to nil strength on 12 February 1965, and transferred to the Supplementary Order of Battle.

=== 22nd Independent Medium Artillery Battery, RCA ===
- Originated on 1 May 1866, in Cobourg as the Garrison Battery of Artillery.
- Redesignated on 1 January 1893, as the Cobourg Company of Garrison Artillery.
- Redesignated on 28 December 1895, as the Cobourg Company of Garrison Artillery, CA.
- Redesignated on 15 February 1913, as the Cobourg Heavy Battery, CGA.
- Redesignated on 2 February 1920, as the 2nd Heavy Battery, CA.
- Redesignated on 1 July 1925, as the 22nd Medium Battery, CA.
- Redesignated on 3 June 1935, as the 22nd Medium Battery, RCA.
- Redesignated on 1 December 1938, as the 22nd (Cobourg) Medium Battery, RCA.
- Redesignated on 7 November 1940, as the 22nd (Reserve) (Cobourg) Medium Battery, RCA.
- Redesignated on 1 April 1946, as the 22nd Medium Battery, RCA.
- Amalgamated on 1 September 1954, with the 47th Anti-Tank Battery (Self Propelled), RCA, and redesignated as the 22nd Independent Medium Battery, RCA.
- Redesignated on 12 April 1960, as the 22nd Independent Medium Artillery Battery, RCA.
- Amalgamated on 6 July 1960, with the 33rd Medium Artillery Regiment, RCA.

=== 47th Anti-Tank Battery (Self-Propelled), RCA ===
The Frontenac Regiment
- Active: 1866-1936
- Country: Canada
- Branch: Canadian Militia
- Type: Line infantry
- Role: Infantry
- Size: One battalion
- Part of: Non-Permanent Active Militia
- Garrison/HQ: Kingston, Ontario
- Engagements: Fenian Raids; North-West Rebellion; First World War
- Battle honours: See #Battle honours

The Frontenac Regiment was an infantry of the Non-Permanent Active Militia of the Canadian Militia (now the Canadian Army). In 1936, the regiment was converted from infantry to artillery and now exists as part of the 33rd Medium Artillery Regiment, RCA – currently on the Supplementary Order of Battle. The regiment was named for Frontenac County.

==== Lineage ====
- Originated on 14 September 1866, in Kingston, Canada West, as the 47th Frontenac Battalion of Infantry.
- Redesignated on 8 May 1900, as the 47th Frontenac Regiment.
- Redesignated on 12 March 1920, as The Frontenac Regiment.
- Converted from infantry to artillery on 15 December 1936, and redesignated as the 47th (Napanee) Field Battery, RCA. A Company, The Frontenac Regiment and “A” Company, 4th Machine Gun Battalion, CMGC were amalgamated with the Princess of Wales' Own Regiment.
- Redesignated on 1 December 1937, as the 47th (Napanee) Field Battery (Howitzer), RCA.
- Redesignated on 7 November 1940, as the 47th (Reserve) (Napanee) Field Battery (Howitzer), RCA.
- Redesignated on 24 June 1942, as the 47th Reserve (Napanee) Field Battery, RCA.
- Redesignated on 1 April 1946, as the 47th Anti-Tank Battery (Self-Propelled), RCA.
- Amalgamated on 1 September 1954, as the 22nd Medium Battery, RCA.

==== Perpetuations ====
- 146th Battalion, CEF

==== History ====
===== Early history =====
On 30 November 1866, the 47th Frontenac Battalion of Infantry was authorized. Its regimental headquarters was at Kingston and had companies at Storrington (Milburn and Inverary), Elginburg, Portsmouth, Garden Island, Wolfe Island and Harrowsmith.

==== Organization ====
===== 47th Frontenac Battalion of Infantry (30 November 1866) =====
- Regimental Headquarters (Kingston)
- No. 1 Company (Storrington and Milburn) (first raised as the 1st Volunteer Militia Company of Storrington - company disbanded on 11 May 1895)
- No. 2 Company (Storrington and Inverary) (first raised as the 2nd Volunteer Militia Company of Storrington)
- No. 3 Company (Elginburgh) (moved on 2 April 1887 to Sydenham)
- No. 4 Company (Portsmouth) (disbanded on 31 January 1894)
- No. 5 Company (Garden Island) (first raised as the Naval Company - disbanded by 1869) (new No. 5 Company raised on 12 March 1869 in Barriefield)
- No. 6 Company (Wolfe Island) (moved on 29 May 1885 to Napanee)
- No. 7 Company (Harrowsmith)

===== 47th Frontenac Battalion of Infantry (16 November 1895) =====
- No. 1 Company (Inverary) (redesignation of No. 2 Company)
- No. 2 Company (Sydenham) (redesignation of No. 3 Company)
- No. 3 Company (Barriefield) (redesignation of No. 5 Company; moved on 1 July 1896 to Moscow; later moved to Verona; moved 15 May 1906 to Fermoy; moved 15 April 1913 to Westport)
- No. 4 Company (Napanee) (redesignation of No. 6 Company)
- No. 5 Company (Moscow) (redesignation of No. 7 Company and moved from Harrowsmith)
- No. 6 Company (Enterprise) (redesignation of No. 8 Company and moved from Tamworth)
- No. 7 Company (Odessa) (redesignation of No. 10 Company; redesignated on 1 April 1903 as No. 8 Company and moved to Amherst Island; later moved on 1 May 1905 to Arden)

==== Battle honours ====
- Arras, 1917 (Note: Selected to be borne on colours and appointments)
- Hill 70
- Ypres, 1917

==== Notable members ====
- Lieutenant Colonel Sir George Airey Kirkpatrick KCMG PC QC
- Lieutenant Colonel Thain Wendell MacDowell VC DSO
- Lance Corporal John Babcock

=== Chart ===
Lineage chart

1862
1866
1885
1893
1895
1900
1913
1914 | 2nd Heavy Bty, CGA, CEF (Note: 2nd Brigade, CGA, CEF)
1915
1916
1920 | Disbanded
1925
1935
1936
1937
1938
1940
1942
1946 | 33rd Medium Regt, RCA
1954
1960 | 33rd Medium Arty Regt, RCA
1960 | 33rd Medium Arty Regt, RCA
1965 | Supplementary Order of Battle

Independent infy and rifle coys
Garrison Bty of Arty at Cobourg | 47th "Frontenac" Bn of Infy
Active service (Note: One company, April–July)
Cobourg Coy of Garrison Arty
Cobourg Coy of Garrison Arty, CA
47th Frontenac Regt
Cobourg Heavy Bty, CGA
146th "Overseas" Bn, CEF
Absorbed by 95th "Overseas" Bn
2nd Heavy Bty, CA (Note: 4th Brigade, CFA) | 1st Bn (146th Bn, CEF), The Frontenac Regt
22nd Medium Bty, CA (Note: 4th Field Brigade, CFA)
22nd Medium Bty, RCA (Note: 4th Field Brigade, RCA)
47th (Napanee) Fd Bty, RCA (Note: A Company to the Princess of Wales' Own Regiment) (Note: 9th Field Brigade, RCA)
47th (Napanee) Fd Bty (Howitzer), RCA
22nd (Cobourg) Medium Bty, RCA
22nd (Reserve) (Cobourg) Medium Bty, RCA (Note: 4th (Reserve) Field Brigade, RCA) | 47th (Reserve) (Napanee) Fd Bty (Howitzer), RCA
47th Reserve (Napanee) Fd Bty, RCA
22nd Medium Bty, RCA (Note: 33rd Medium Regiment, RCA) | 47th Anti-Tank Bty (Self-Propelled), RCA
22nd Independent Medium Bty, RCA
22nd Independent Medium Arty Bty, RCA

== Allocated batteries ==
=== 33rd Medium Regiment, RCA (1 April 1946) ===
- 14th Medium Battery, RCA
- 47th Medium Battery, RCA

=== 33rd Medium Artillery Regiment, RCA (6 July 1960) ===
- 14th Medium Battery, RCA
- 47th Medium Battery, RCA

== Operational history ==
=== North West Rebellion ===
On 10 April 1885, the 47th Frontenac Battalion of Infantry mobilized a company for active service that served as part of the Midland Battalion in the Alberta Column of the North West Field Force. On 24 July 1885, the company was removed from active service.

=== Great War ===
On 6 August 1914, the Cobourg Heavy Battery was placed on active service and during the fall of 1914, the battery served in Lévis, Quebec, and Vancouver, British Columbia, providing coastal artillery support.

On 7 November 1914, The 2nd Heavy Battery, CGA, CEF, was authorized and on 15 June 1915, the battery embarked for Great Britain. On 16 September 1915, the battery disembarked in France where it provided heavy artillery support as part of the 2nd Brigade, CGA, CEF in France and Flanders until the end of the war. On 23 October 1920, the battery was disbanded.

On 22 December 1915, The 146th Battalion, CEF was authorized, and on 25 September 1916, the battalion embarked for Great Britain. After its arrival in the UK, on 7 October 1916, the battalion's personnel were absorbed by the 95th Battalion, CEF, where it provided reinforcements for the Canadian Corps in the field. On 17 July 1917, The 146th Battalion, CEF was disbanded.
