= Ontario Highway 96 =

Former Ontario provincial highway

Highway 96

Route information
- Maintained by the Ministry of Transportation of Ontario
- Length: 32.8 km (20.4 mi)
- Existed: May 22, 1935–January 1, 1998

Major junctions
- West end: 2nd Line Road
- Highway 95 in Marysville
- East end: Port Metcalfe (cul-de-sac)

Location
- Country: Canada
- Province: Ontario
- Towns: Marysville

Highway system
- Ontario provincial highways; Current; Former; 400-series
← Highway 95	→ Highway 97

King's Highway 96, commonly referred to as Highway 96, was a provincially maintained highway in the Canadian province of Ontario on Wolfe Island and the main street of Marysville, the island's main village. Together with Highway 95, the routes were the only King's Highway not connected to the rest of the network by a fixed link. Today it is under the jurisdiction of Frontenac Islands Township as Frontenac County does not have a county road system.

== Route description ==
Highway 96 was a short highway that travelled in a generally east–west direction across Wolfe Island. The route began at 2nd Line Road, immediately west of the ferry connection to Simcoe Island. From there it travelled east, passing through Marysville where it connected with Highway 95 and the summer ferry to Kingston, named the Wolfe Islander III; the ferry docks further east during the winter months and Dawson Point. Unlike the private ferry service at the southern tip of the island, the Wolfe Islander III is operated by the Ministry of Transportation and can be used free of charge. From Dawson Point Road, just east of Marysville, the highway continued east across the island. It zig-zagged south and east several times, passing the Wolfe Island Tourist Information Centre and heading towards its eastern terminus at a cul-de-sac facing the St. Lawrence River. Beside the ferry services, there is no other link between Wolfe Island and the mainland, making the two routes on the island the only King's Highways that were not connected to the rest of the network by a fixed link.

== History ==
Highway 96 was established on May 22, 1935, when the Department of Highways assumed several existing concession roads. Highway 96 was the second King's Highway on Wolfe Island, Highway 95 having been established the previous year. The route remained generally unchanged, except for the addition of gentler curves, until its decommissioning on January 1, 1998. It was subsequently transferred to the municipality and designated as County Road 96.

Highways 95 and 96 originally connected to the remainder of the Ontario highway system via ferry crossing to Ontario Street in Kingston, which was a connecting link in Ontario Highway 2. The removal of the local portion of that road from the provincial highway system in 1998 nominally disconnects 95 and 96 from the provincial King's Highway network.

== Major intersections ==
The following table lists the junctions along Highway 96, as noted by the Ministry of Transportation of Ontario. The entire route was located in Frontenac County, on Wolfe Island.

Location	km	mi	Destinations	Notes
Wolfe Island	0.0	0.0	2nd Line Road	
Marysville	5.8	3.6	Highway 95 (Main Street)	Highway 95 was once concurrent with Highway 96 between here and Centre Street
Wolfe Island	8.3	5.2	Highway 7051 (Dawson Point Road)	Access to winter ferry to Kingston
Wolfe Island	12.9	8.0	Oak Point Road	Wolfe Island Tourist Information Centre
Port Metcalf	32.8	20.4		Highway ends at a cul-de-sac facing the St. Lawrence River
1.000 mi = 1.609 km; 1.000 km = 0.621 mi

== See also ==
- List of numbered roads in Frontenac County
