= List of numbered roads in Kingston and Frontenac County =

This is a list of numbered municipal roads in Kingston and Frontenac County, Ontario.

The City of Kingston is a single-tier municipality not under the jurisdiction of an upper-tier municipality such as Frontenac County and thus, is outside of the geographic limits of Frontenac County for municipal purposes. For geographic purposes however, Kingston is within the geographic limits of Frontenac County. The City of Kingston forms part of the county's census division.

The numbered roads in this list are not under the jurisdiction of Frontenac County (only their numbers are, for coordination); the responsibility for their maintenance is with the individual townships (and City of Kingston). As a result, the "flowerpot" municipal road shields are signed with the name of the township, such as Central Frontenac, Kingston or Wolfe Island (for Frontenac Islands Township). South Frontenac Township makes reference to its numbered township highways as Township Road n in law.

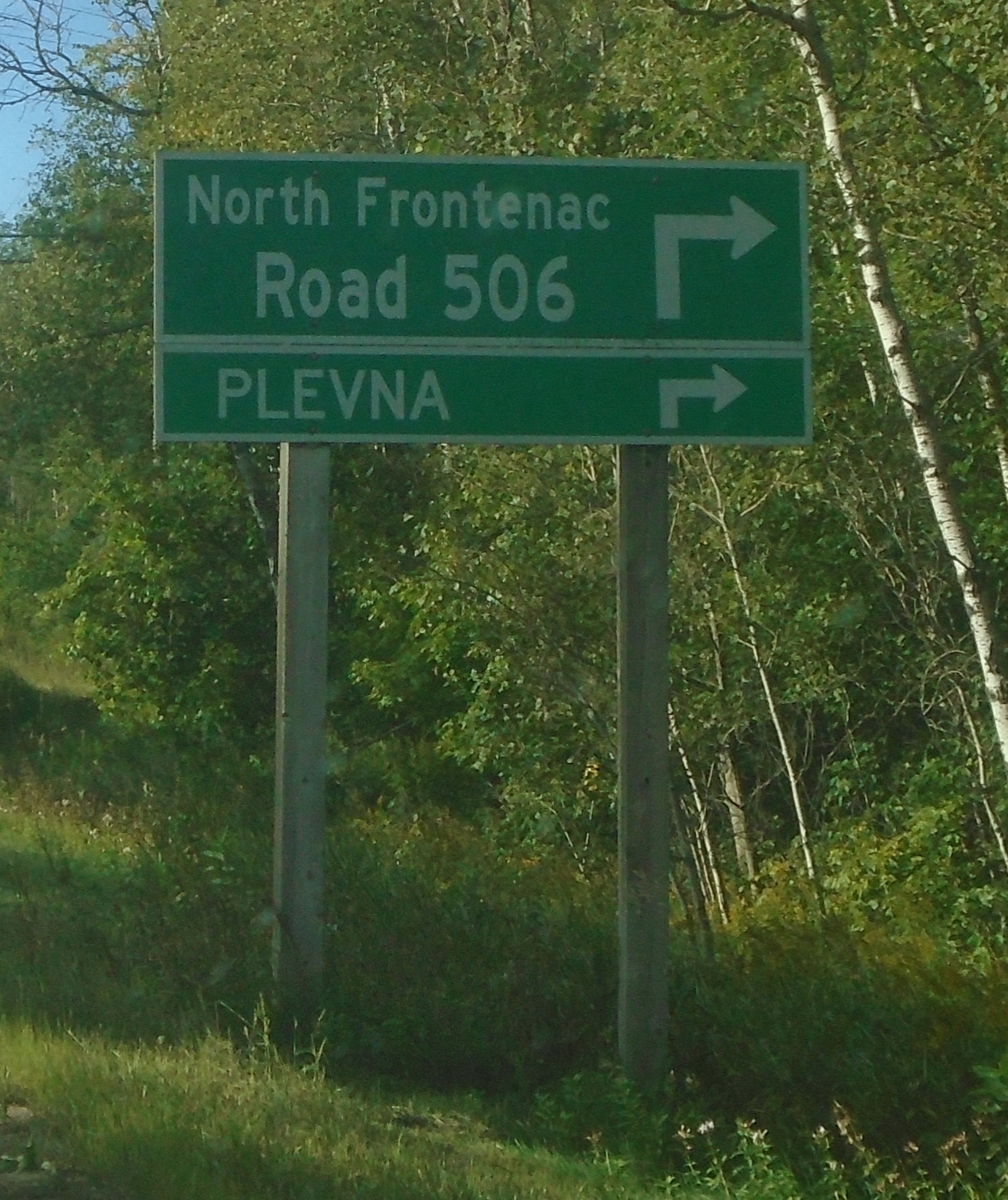
Former Highway 506, now signed North Frontenac Road 506 as it is under the jurisdiction of North Frontenac Township

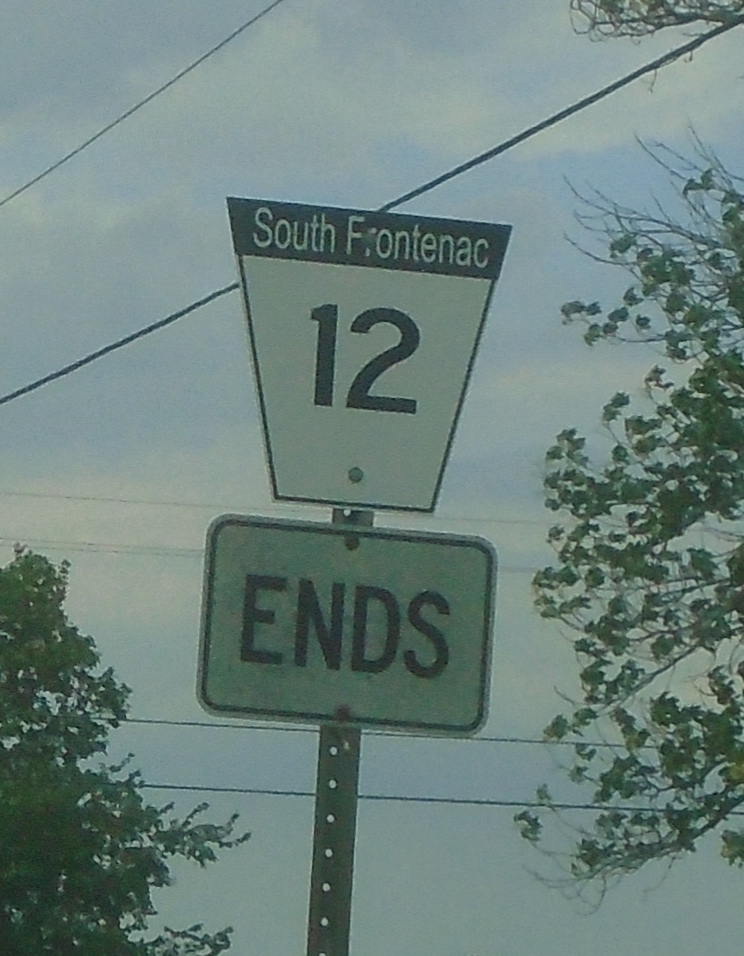
"Flowerpot" shield with South Frontenac and a route number

== Main List ==
Route(s)	Name	West/South Terminus	East/North Terminus	Communities	Comments
Kingston Road 1	Front Road	Lemoine Point	King Street West	Kingston	Unsigned, arterial route
Kingston Road 2	Princess Street	County Road 2 At Neil Rd (Continuation into Lennox & Addington)	Deer Ridge Drive	Kingston	Formerly Highway 2
Kingston Road 3	Unity Road	County Road 19 (Lennox & Addington) Howes Road	Kingston Road 11	Elginburg, Glenburnie	Unsigned
South Frontenac Township Road 4	Yarker Road	County Road 1E (Lennox & Addington) in Stone Mills	Township Road 38		
South Frontenac Township Road 5	Harrowsmith Road Rutledge Road	Township Road 38 Township Road 18 in Harrowsmith	Township Road 10	Harrowsmith	
South Frontenac Township Road 7	Bellrock Road	County Road 14 in Stone Mills	Township Road 38	Verona	
South Frontenac Township Road 8	Westport Road	Township Road 38 near Piccadilly	County Road 12 in Rideau Lakes	Godfrey, Fermoy	
Kingston Road 9; South Frontenac Township Road 9	Sydenham Road	Princess Street	Township Road 5	Kingston, Sydenham	
Kingston Road 10; South Frontenac Township Road 10	Division Street; Perth Road	Division Street at Highway 401	County Road 10 in Rideau Lakes	Kingston, Westport, Perth Road Village, Inverary, Buck Lake, Glenburnie	
Kingston Road 11; South Frontenac Township Road 11	Battersea Road	Montreal Street at Highway 401	County Road 11	Sunbury, Battersea	Continues as Montreal Street in Kingston.
Kingston Road 12; South Frontenac Township Road 12	Moreland-Dixon Road (West) Sunbury Road (East)	Township Road 10 in Inverary	Highway 15		
Kingston Road 13	Sand Hill Road	Continues as: County Road 13	Highway 15		
Kingston Road 15	Highway 15	Highway 2	Highway 401 Highway 15	Kingston	Continues as Highway 15
Kingston Road 16	Joyceville Road	Highway 2	Highway 15	Joyceville	
North Frontenac Township Road 16	S Lavant Road	Township Road 509	Continuation into Lanark County County Road 16	Beatty	
Kingston Road 17	Days Road	Front Road	Bath Road	Kingston	Unsigned
South Frontenac Township Road 18	Wilton Road	County Road 20	Township Road 38 Township Road 18	Harrowsmith	Unsigned between Kingston line and Loyalist Township
South Frontenac Township Road 19	Canoe Lake Road	Township Road 38	Walker Road, Sydenham	Desert Lake, Sydenham	
Kingston Road 21	Kingston Mills Road	Road 11	Road 15	Kingston Mills	
Frontenac Islands Township Road 22	Howe Island Drive	Howe Island Ferry West End To: Road 16 Road 2 (Kingston)	Howe Island Ferry East End County Road 37 (Leeds & Grenville)	Howe Island	
Kingston Road 23	Taylor-Kidd Boulevard	County Road 23 (Lennox & Addington)	Princess Street	Kingston	
Kingston Road 25	Bayridge Drive	Front Road	Creekford Road	Kingston	Unsigned
Kingston Road 33	Bath Road	Highway 33 at Collins Bay Road	Princess Street	Kingston	Formerly Highway 33; part of Loyalist Parkway
Kingston Road 38; South Frontenac Township Road 38; Central Frontenac Township Road 38	Gardiners Road	Road 33 Bath Road	Highway 7	Kingston, Verona, Sharbot Lake	Formerly Highway 38
Frontenac Islands Township Road 95	Highway 95	Wolfe Island Ferry Dock, Marysville	Point Alexandria	Marysville, Wolfe Island	Formerly Highway 95
Frontenac Islands Township Road 96	Highway 96	2nd Line Road	Port Metcalf	Scotch Settlement, Wolfe Island	Formerly Highway 96
North Frontenac Township Road 506	Road 506	Highway 41	Township Road 509		Formerly Highway 506
Central Frontenac Township Road 509; North Frontenac Township Road 509	Road 509	Highway 7	Township Road 506	Clarendon, Snow Road, Ompah	Formerly Highway 509
