= 2014 Frontenac County municipal elections =

Local election in Ontario, Canada

Elections were held in Frontenac County, Ontario on October 27, 2014 in conjunction with municipal elections across the province.

== Frontenac County Council ==
Frontenac County Council consists of the mayors of each of the four constituent municipalities plus an additional councillor from each municipality.

Position	Elected
Central Frontenac Mayor	Frances Smith
Central Frontenac Councillor	Selected from council
Frontenac Islands Mayor	Dennis Doyle
Frontenac Islands Councillor	Selected from council
North Frontenac Mayor	Ron Higgins
North Frontenac Councillor	Selected from council
South Frontenac Mayor	Ron Vandewal
South Frontenac Councillor	Selected from council

== Central Frontenac ==
Mayoral Candidate	Vote	%
Frances Smith	1,996	64.83
Janet Gutowski (X)	1,083	35.17

== Frontenac Islands ==
Mayoral Candidate	Vote	%
Dennis Doyle (X)	1,184	81.88
Mike Bromley	262	18.12

== North Frontenac ==
Mayoral Candidate	Vote	%
Ron Higgins	1,359	68.33
Claudio Valentini	630	31.67

== South Frontenac ==
Mayoral Candidate	Vote	%
Ron Vandewal	3,048	47.77
Allan McPhail	2,780	43.57
John A. McEwen	552	8.65
