= Ontario Highway 95 =

Former Ontario provincial highway

King's Highway 95

Route information
- Maintained by the Ministry of Transportation of Ontario
- Length: 11.4 km (7.1 mi)
- Existed: July 25, 1934–January 1, 1998

Major junctions
- South end: Horne's Ferry to Cape Vincent, New York
- North end: Highway 96 in Marysville

Location
- Country: Canada
- Province: Ontario

Highway system
- Ontario provincial highways; Current; Former; 400-series
← Highway 94	→ Highway 96

King's Highway 95, commonly referred to as Highway 95, was a provincially maintained highway in the Canadian province of Ontario on Wolfe Island. Together with Highway 96, the routes were the only King's Highways not connected to the rest of the network by a fixed link. At its southern end, the 11.4-kilometre (7.1 mi) route connected to New York State Route 12E via the private and seasonal Horne's Ferry. At its northern end, it connected with Highway 96 in Marysville a short distance west of the Wolfe Islander III ferry to Kingston. Today it is under the jurisdiction of Frontenac Islands Township, as Frontenac County does not have a county road system.

== Route description ==
Highway 95 was an 11.4-kilometre (7.1 mi), two-lane highway that travelled in a generally north–south direction across Wolfe Island. At its southern end at Point Alexandria, the route connected with New York State Route 12E at Cape Vincent via the private summer-operated Horne's Ferry. The route travelled west from there, sandwiched between Button Bay to the north and the Saint Lawrence River to the south. At Stevenson Lane, the route made a broad curve to the north. From there it crossed the island to Marysville, where it encountered Highway 96 and the summer ferry dock for the Wolfe Islander III. Unlike the private ferry service at the southern tip of the island, the Wolfe Islander III is operated by the Ministry of Transportation and can be used free of charge. Beside the ferry services, there is no other link between Wolfe Island and the mainland, making the two routes on the island the only King's Highways that were not connected to the rest of the network by a fixed link.

== History ==
Highway 95 was established on July 25, 1934, when the Department of Highways, predecessor to the modern Ministry of Transportation, assumed the road connecting Point Alexandria to Marysville and the Wolfe Island Ferry. At that time, it was the only highway on the island; Highway 96 was established the following year. The entire route was decommissioned in January 1998. It was subsequently transferred to Frontenac County, which does not maintain a county road system. The county transferred the route to the municipality of Frontenac Islands, which designated it as Road 95.

== Major intersections ==
The following table lists the junctions along Highway 95, as noted by the Ministry of Transportation of Ontario. The entire route was located in Frontenac County, on Wolfe Island.

Location	km	mi	Destinations	Notes
Point Alexandria	0.0	0.0	Horne's Ferry (seasonal) to Cape Vincent, New York / NY 12E (Broadway Street)	
Marysville	11.4	7.1	Highway 96 (Main Street)	
1.000 mi = 1.609 km; 1.000 km = 0.621 mi

== See also ==
- List of numbered roads in Frontenac County
