= Garden Island (Ontario) =

Island in Ontario, Canada

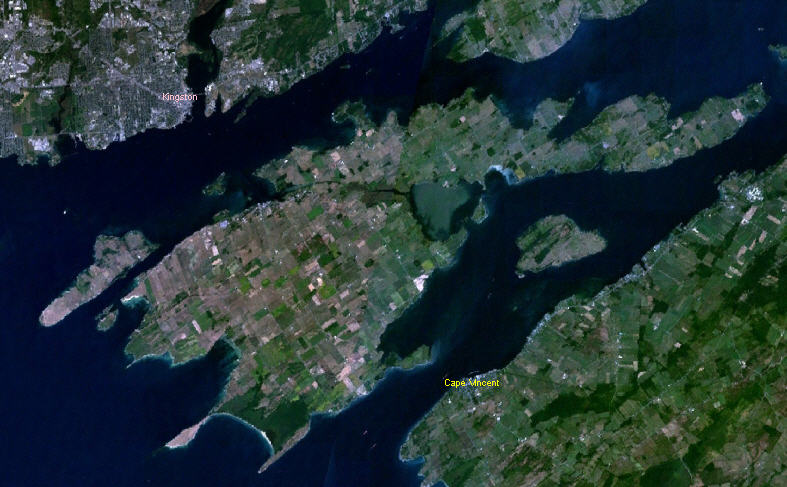
- NASA image of Wolfe Island. Garden Island is the small island north of Wolfe Island directly beneath the mouth of the river labelled Kingston. New York is the landmass in the right corner.

- Location within Southern Ontario

Geography
- Location: St. Lawrence River
- Coordinates: 44°12′02″N 76°27′57″W
- Archipelago: Thousand Islands
- Area: 30.75 ha (76.0 acres)

Administration
- Canada
- Province: Ontario
- County: Frontenac County
- Township: Frontenac Islands

Garden Island is an island in the municipality of Frontenac Islands, Frontenac County, in Eastern Ontario, Canada. Part of the Thousand Islands, it is located in the Saint Lawrence River, approximately 2 miles (3 km) south of Kingston, northwest of Wolfe Island, and is 30.75 hectares (76.0 acres) in size.

From the mid-1830s to around 1914, Delino Dexter Calvin and, later, his son, Hiram Augustus, operated a shipping and lumber operation based on the island. There was small industry consisting of timber transported to the island on ships and then assembled into large rafts that were floated down the Saint Lawrence River to Quebec City for transport to Britain. Now somewhat of a ghost town, few remnants of the original village exist.

The history of the former shipyard is the subject of an exhibit at the Marine Museum of the Great Lakes in Kingston.

== Geology ==
The geology of Garden Island is consistent with Wolfe Island and Howe Island as they are all part of the township of Frontenac Islands.

=== Precambrian geology ===
The bedrock of the island consists of metamorphic and igneous Precambrian rocks, which are part of the Frontenac Terrane of the Central Metasedimentary Belt. This is consistent with a significant amount of the geology of Frontenac County. The metamorphic rocks, were deposited as sediments and consolidated into sedimentary rocks at least 950 million years ago. The combination of a deep burial of sedimentary rocks and the penetration of magma which resulted in igneous rocks. Erosion then revealed the metamorphic and igneous rocks. The metamorphic rocks that are found in the area include: schist, gneiss, amphibolites, quartzite, and marble. The igneous rocks found include: quartz monzonites, granites, diorites, gabbro, diabase, and andesite.

=== Paleozoic geology ===
About 500 million years ago, a shallow ocean covered the area and deposited eroded sediment.

=== Surficial geology ===
Ending approximately 10,000 years ago, the Wisconsinian glacier deposited the remaining overburden in the Frontenac Islands, including Garden Island. This, the last period of glaciation in North America, transported large amounts of eroded Paleozoic and Precambrian rock from the north and deposited over the bedrock surface. The mass of the ice from the glacier induced a downward force which enabled the Atlantic Ocean to flow inward creating what is called the Champlain Sea.

== Delino Dexter Calvin ==
In 1844, Delino Dexter Calvin, an American businessman, rented space on Garden Island to conduct his timber exportation business as the location was ideal as it provided a sheltered bay for building rafts of timber and for access to retrieve the bound rafts. Further, it allowed Calvin to operate within the British (commonwealth) system which enabled shipping to Great Britain. Vertically integrated, Calvin arranged shipment via company offices in Liverpool and Glasgow.

The rafts were fastened together into units called "drams" that could be as large as one-half mile in length. In the early timber days, the rafts were powered either by sail or by the men using long oars known as "sweeps". The men, usually French-Canadians, would guide the rafts through the currents of the St. Lawrence to Quebec, a trip that could last over a month. Later, the rafts would be guided by tug-boats.

=== Ship building ===
To subsidize timber activities and stabilize employment of his company men, Calvin started a lucrative shipbuilding business on Garden Island. In 1836, the first vessel was built for the timber trade, the 140-ton Queen Victoria. In 1837, two more 140-ton ships were constructed, the William Penn and the Hannah Counter.

=== Company community ===
In 1862, Calvin's company purchased the entire island. To conduct operations on the island, a small community of about 750 people resided on the island, mostly workers in Calvin's companies and their families. The island included three streets: Broadway, Fancy Street and Blanchette Avenue. Houses were built by the company and rented to workers and their families. As the island community grew, so did their needs. Garden Island soon included a butcher, baker and a general store that sold dairy farmed on an island dairy farm. In 1867 telegraph wires dotted the island, and in 1890 the telephone arrived. Calvin was a generous benefactor to his employees, subsidizing a school, a library, post office, and several fraternal societies: a Temperance society, an Orange Lodge and a Masonic Lodge. The library was referred to as a "Mechanics Institute" which carried over 6,000 books as a result of a Carnegie Endowment. The island was so self-contained, that it utilized its own currency.

In the panic that ensued after a recession, rather than laying off employees, Calvin instead chose to reduce wages to maintain constant employment for all. In keeping with his own personal beliefs of abstention, the island embraced prohibition.

As timber resources dwindled in the Great Lakes region, the mainstay of Calvin's business retreated similarly. By 1921, the population of Garden Island had dwindled to only four residents. The island's "village status" was renounced and it was placed under the Township of Wolfe Island.

The island is owned today by descendants of Calvin who use it as a summer retreat. The ferry from Wolfe Island offered service to Garden Island until 1976 when it was discontinued.
