= Salem, Frontenac County, Ontario =

Salem
- Compact Rural Community
- Location in southern Ontario
- Coordinates: 44°39′21″N 76°27′18″W
- Country: Canada
- Province: Ontario
- County: Frontenac
- Municipality: South Frontenac
- Elevation: 169 m (554 ft)
- Time zone: UTC-5 (Eastern Time Zone)
  - Summer (DST): UTC-4 (Eastern Time Zone)
- Postal Code: K0G 1X0
- Area codes: 613, 343

Salem is a Compact Rural Community and unincorporated place in the municipality of South Frontenac, Frontenac County in southern Ontario, Canada. The community is in geographic Bedford Township, and lies on the county border with the municipality of Rideau Lakes, United Counties of Leeds and Grenville.
