= Pitts Ferry, Ontario =

Pitts Ferry
- Location of Pitts Ferry in Ontario
- Coordinates: 44°17′21″N 76°19′41″W
- Country: Canada
- Province: Ontario
- County: Frontenac
- Municipality: Kingston
- Elevation: 87 m (285 ft)
- Time zone: UTC-5 (Eastern Time Zone)
  - Summer (DST): UTC-4 (Eastern Time Zone)
- Postal code: FSA K7L
- Area codes: 613 / 343

Pitts Ferry is a community that is part of Kingston, Frontenac County, Ontario, Canada.

== Geography ==
Pitts Ferry is on the east side of Kingston on the Bateau Channel of the Saint Lawrence River, on north shore of the river. The north shore of Howe Island lies across on the south side of the channel. The town crossroads at the intersection of Highway 2 and Joyceville Road / Howe Island Ferry Road, and the location given for the community in the Atlas of Canada, is at an elevation of 87 metres (285 ft), slightly above the 74-metre (243 ft) level of the St. Lawrence.

== Politics ==
Pitts Ferry is in the federal and provincial riding of Kingston and the Islands, represented federally by MP Ted Hsu (Liberal; last contested 2011) and provincially by MPP John Gerretsen (Liberal; last contested 2011). Municipally, it is in City of Kingston Electoral District 12 - Pittsburgh District, and is represented by councillor Brian Reitzel (last contested 2010) and by Mayor Mark Gerretsen.

== Recreation ==
The Waterfront Trail passes along Highway 2 through the community.

== Transportation ==
Highway 2 runs east-west through the community leading to the town centre of Kingston to the west and to Gananoque to the east. Joyceville Road and Howe Island Ferry Road run north-south. Joyceville Road leads from the town crossroads via the community of Kilbirnie to an interchange on Highway 401 and further to Joyceville. Howe Island Ferry Road leads south from the crossroads to the ferry docks to Howe Island, one of two ferries to that island.
