= Battersea, Ontario =

Community in Ontario, Canada

Battersea
- Community
- Battersea in 1878

- Location within Southern Ontario Location within Ontario Location within Canada
- Coordinates: 44°25′55″N 76°23′00″W
- Country: Canada
- Province: Ontario
- County: Frontenac
- Township: South Frontenac

Battersea is a community in the Canadian province of Ontario, located in the township of South Frontenac, 20 kilometres (12 mi) north of Kingston. Battersea is well known for its fishing and outdoor activities as it is close to Loughborough Lake, Dog Lake and the Rideau Canal Waterway.

== History ==
Henry Van Luven, a veteran of the Battle of Lundy's Lane, was the founder of the village of Battersea in 1840 when he bought 1,200 acres (4.9 km^{2}) of crown land at the time of the development of the Rideau Canal. Originally called Van Luven's Mills, then Rockland, the post office requested it be renamed to avoid confusion with a similarly named city elsewhere in the province. His first choice was to name it after a section of London, England and that was accepted. He gave 200 acres (0.81 km^{2}) to each of his six sons and lots in the village of Battersea to his daughters.

Henry Van Luven's House, built 1840

He was elected in 1850 as the first reeve of Storrington Township. Henry built the stone mill in Battersea which was later owned and operated by the Anglin family.

The large Van Luven family home is on a rise at the entrance to what is now Battersea and in 1912 the home was converted into a fishing lodge, now called the Holiday Manor Northern Lodge.

In the fall of 2017, a ribbon cutting ceremony was held during the Battersea Pumpkin Festival to commemorate the new play structures that had been recently installed at the local park. Funding for the structures was raised over the course of 8 months through community events as well as funding from the Township of South Frontenac.
