= Loughborough (disambiguation) =

Loughborough is a town in Leicestershire, England.

Loughborough may also refer to:

== United Kingdom ==
- Baron Loughborough
- Loughborough Grammar School
- Loughborough University
- Loughborough Junction
- Loughborough (UK Parliament constituency)

== Other uses ==
- Loughborough Lake, a lake in Eastern Ontario, Canada
- Loughborough v. Blake, an 1820 U.S. Supreme Court case concerning the taxation of Washington, D.C.
- John Norton Loughborough, early Seventh-day Adventist minister
