= Howe Island =

Island in the Saint Lawrence Rive, governed by Ontario, Canada

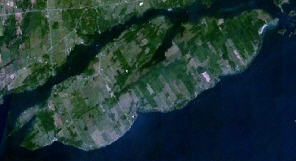
- NASA image
- Interactive map of Howe Island

Geography
- Location: St. Lawrence River
- Coordinates: 44°16′13″N 76°17′1″W
- Archipelago: Thousand Islands
- Area: 31 km^{2} (12 sq mi)

Administration
- Canada
- Province: Ontario
- County: Frontenac County
- Township: Frontenac Islands

Demographics
- Population: 602 (2011)

Howe Island is an island located in Lake Ontario east of Kingston in Frontenac County, Ontario, Canada. It is part of the Thousand Islands chain. Together with Wolfe Island and Simcoe Island, Howe Island is part of the township of Frontenac Islands, created through municipal amalgamation in 1998.

Howe Island measures 13 km (8 mi) long and 5 km (3 mi) wide and has an area of 31 km^{2} (12 mi^{2}). It is the 2nd largest of the “Thousand Islands”. The main channel of the St. Lawrence River passes to the south of the island and merges with Lake Ontario, while the Bateau Channel passes on the north between the Canadian mainland and the island.

== History ==
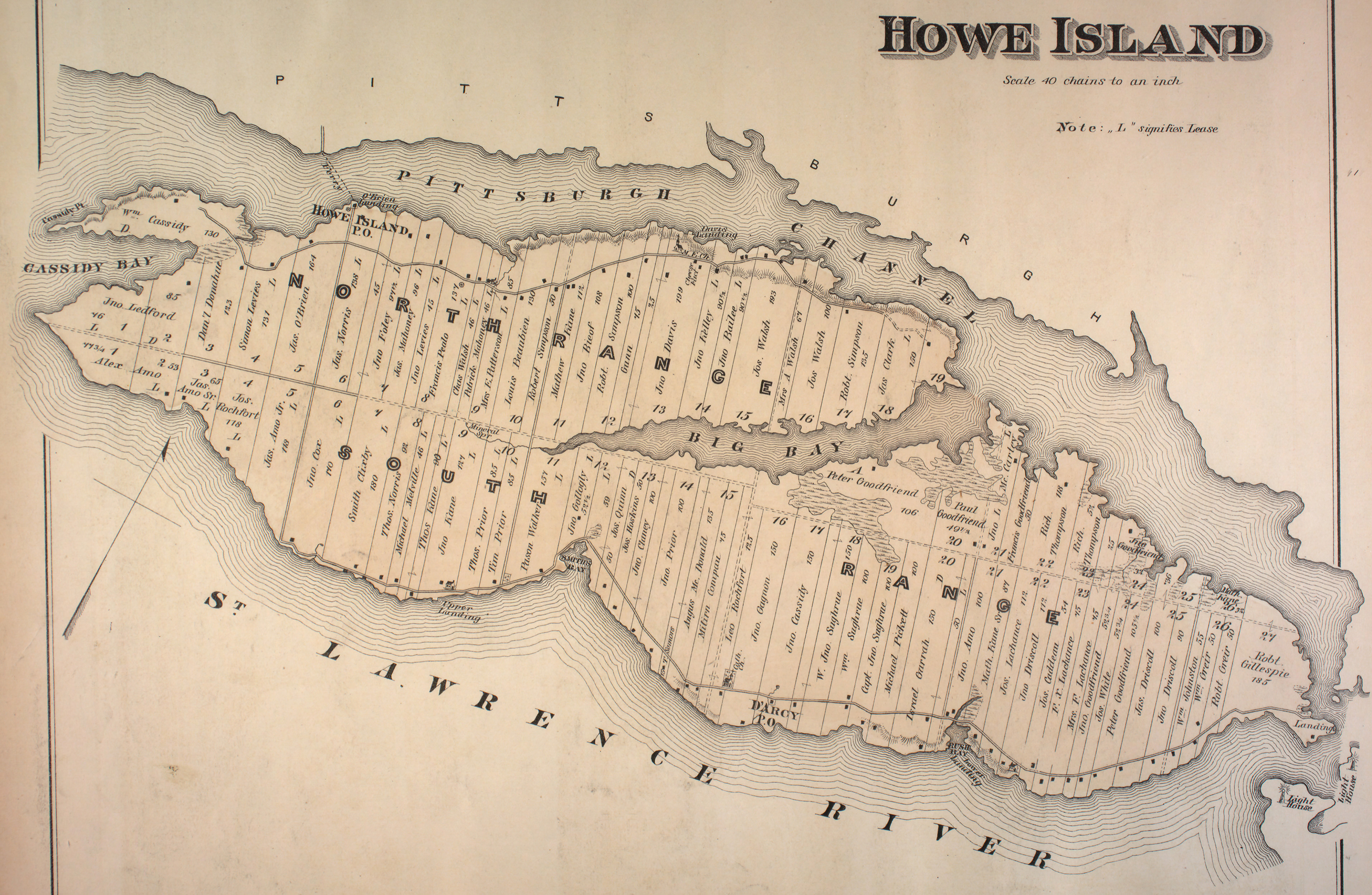
1878 map of Howe Island

Howe Island was originally named Ka-ou-enesegoan by local Iroquoian people and later Isle Cauchois after its first French owner Jacques Cauchois who took possession in 1685. In a proclamation by the Lieutenant Governor of Upper Canada John Graves Simcoe on 16 July 1792, the island was renamed from Isle Cauchois to Howe island; it was named for William Howe, 5th Viscount Howe, a British officer who served under General James Wolfe at the Battle of the Plains of Abraham during the Seven Years' War, and first appeared on a map in 1818 following a survey by Captain (later Vice Admiral) William Fitzwilliam Owen of the Royal Navy. There is some evidence (received by oral tradition) that it was at one time also called St. John's. There is no evidence of any permanent habitation until 1810 by a man named William Casey. In the following four decades successive waves of settlers brought many of the island's long standing families who still live or own land there.

Howe Island has a shared community of farming, as well as "cottagers". The Island also has a small Roman Catholic Church: St. Philomena's.

== Demographics ==
The population of Howe Island in 2011 was 602, although this figure expands in the summer months when recreational properties are occupied.

== Transportation ==
Two ferry services connect the island to the mainland: a County-operated ferry on the west from the community of Pitts Ferry, part of Kingston; and the Township-operated "Foot Ferry" on the east from Gananoque.

== See also ==
- List of townships in Ontario
