= Wolfe Islander II =

History
- Name: Wolfe Islander II
- Route: Kingston, Ontario and Wolfe Island (Ontario)
- Builder: Collingwood
- In service: 1946
- Out of service: 1975
- Identification: IMO number: 5392458
- Fate: Sunk as artificial reef on 21 September 1985

General characteristics
- Capacity: 16 cars

Wolfe Islander II was a ferry that served between Kingston, Ontario and Wolfe Island, Canada, between 1946 and 1975, when she was replaced by the Wolfe Islander III.

Originally named Ottawa Maybrook, she was built in Collingwood, Ontario to be included in an economic aid package to China in 1946. However, as World War II ended, the aid package was canceled and she was converted into a side-loading 16-car ferry and renamed Wolfe Islander II. She has an approximate length of 164 feet. Between 1975 and 1985, she was kept as a reserve ferry to be used when Wolfe Islander III was being serviced.

The boat was purposefully sunk on 21 September 1985 in the waters near Dawson's Point of Wolfe Island and is a scuba diving attraction.

Between 1904 and 1946, Thomas Fawcett (renamed Wolfe Islander in 1905) served in the same capacity before she was replaced by Wolfe Islander II.
