= Loughborough Lake =

Lake in Frontenac County, Ontario, Canada

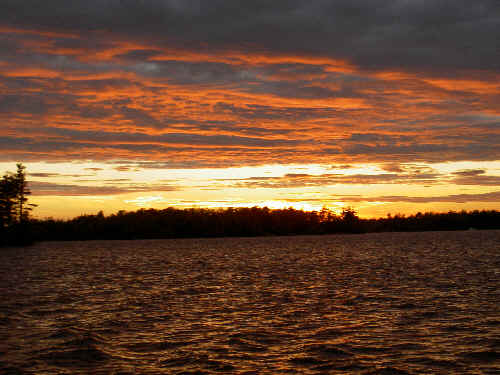
- The lake at sunset

- Location in southern Ontario
- Coordinates: 44°26′50″N 76°24′41″W
- Part of: Great Lakes Basin
- Primary outflows: Loughborough Lake Creek; Milburn Creek
- Basin countries: Canada
- Max. length: 24 kilometres (15 mi)
- Surface area: 18.90 square kilometres (7.30 sq mi)
- Average depth: 7.55 metres (24 ft 9 in)
- Max. depth: 38.4 metres (126 ft 0 in)
- Water volume: 13.2×10^{6} cubic metres (4.7×10^{8} cu ft)
- Surface elevation: 124.625 metres (409 ft)
- Islands: Big Is, Griffiths Is, Horseshoe Is, Loon Is, Plumb Is, Whitefish Is
- Settlements: Battersea

Loughborough Lake is a lake in Eastern Ontario, Canada. The lake is mostly in the municipality of South Frontenac, Frontenac County, except for the southern tip which is in and on the northern border of the separated city of Kingston, and is about 20 kilometres (12 mi) north of the town centre of Kingston.

Loughborough Lake is in the Great Lakes Basin, is 24 kilometres (15 mi) long and 18.90 square kilometres (7.30 sq mi) in area, with many small islands, and has 119 kilometres (74 mi) of shoreline.

Loon Island in the centre of the lake is privately owned by actor Dan Aykroyd.

== See also ==
- List of lakes in Ontario
