= Hartington, Ontario =

Village in Ontario, Canada

Hartington
- Unincorporated community
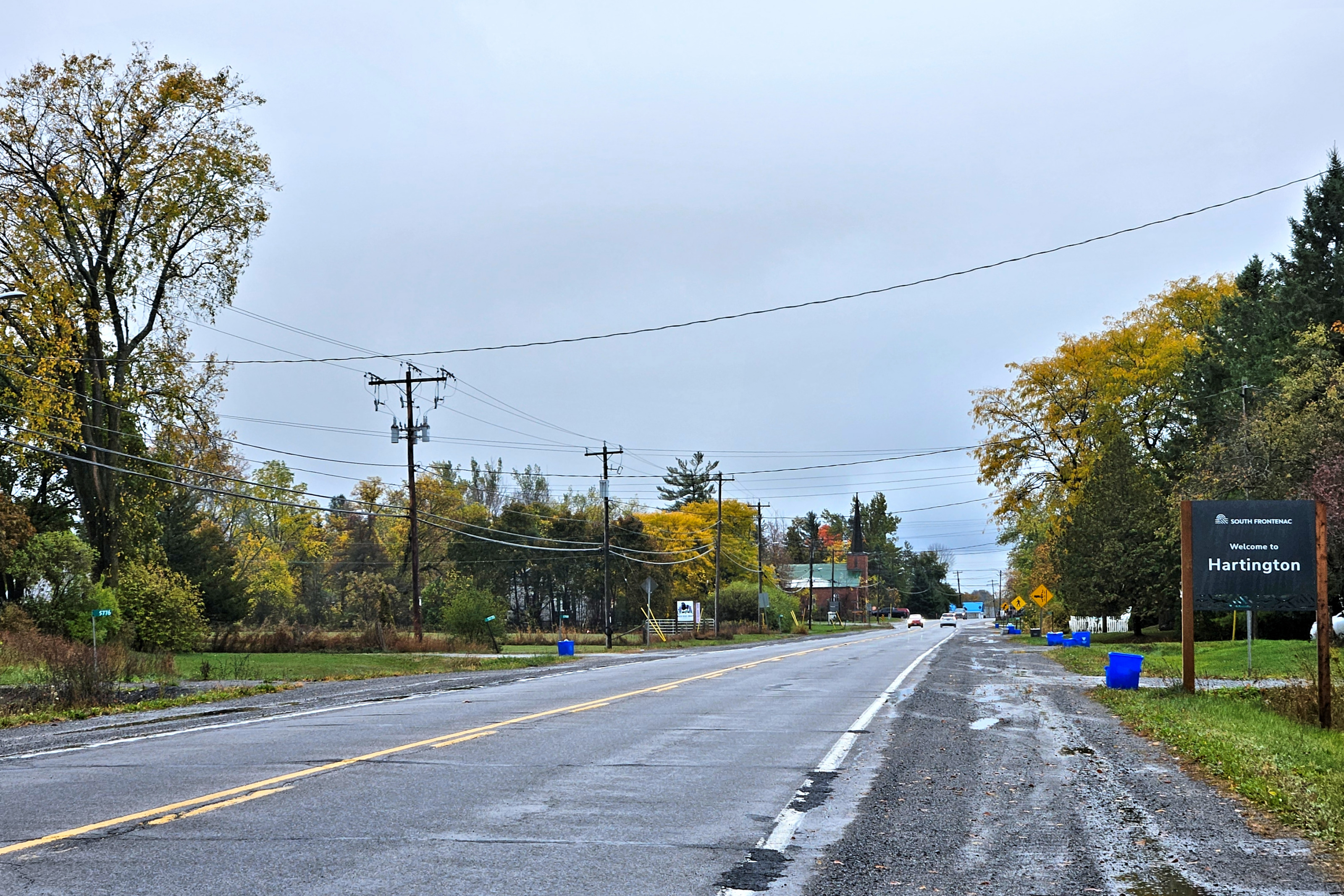

- Location within Southern Ontario
- Coordinates: 44°26′30″N 76°40′10″W
- Country: Canada
- Province: Ontario
- County: Frontenac
- Municipality: South Frontenac

Government
  - Fed. riding: Lanark—Frontenac
  - Prov. riding: Lanark—Frontenac—Kingston
- Time zone: UTC-5 (EST)
  - Summer (DST): UTC-4 (EDT)
- Postal code: K0H 1W0
- Area code(s): 613

Hartington is a small village in South Frontenac Township, located about 23.3 kilometres (14.5 mi) north of Kingston, Ontario, Canada on Provincial Route 38 (previously Highway 38). It was formerly a stop on the Kingston and Pembroke Railway. It is notable as being close to the Holleford meteor crater.

== Services ==
The Ontario Provincial Police operate the Frontenac Detachment at 5282 Hinchinbrooke Rd.

Fire Hall #4, a part of South Frontenac Fire Services is located at 4808 Holleford Rd.

The Hartington Branch of the Kingston Frontenac Public Library is located at 5598 Rd 38.
