= Holleford crater =

Meteorite crater in Frontenac, Ontario, Canada

Holleford Crater
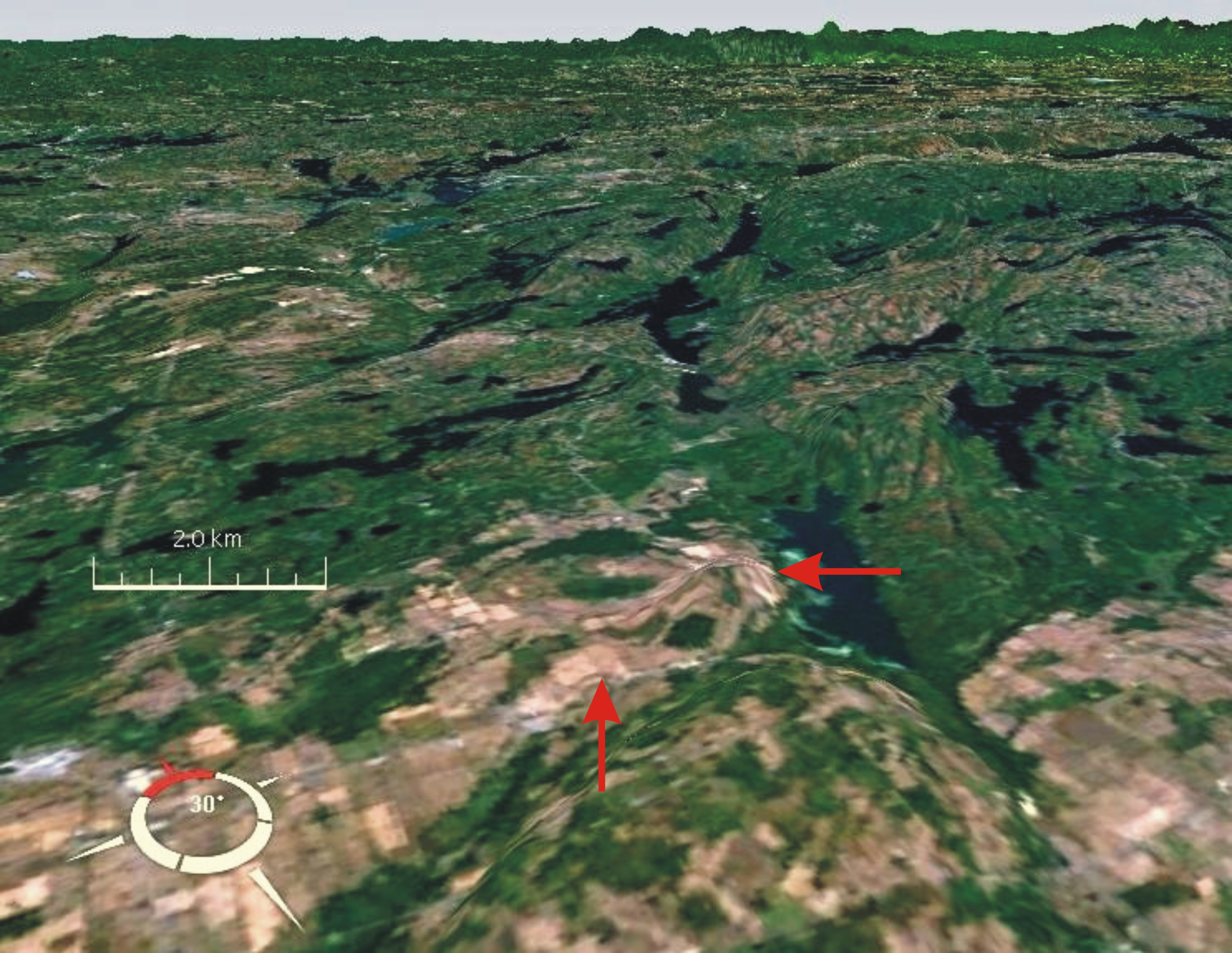
- Oblique Landsat image of Holleford crater draped over digital elevation model (x10 vertical exaggeration). Although the crater itself is buried, its location (arrows) is marked by a subtle surface depression. Screen capture from NASA World Wind.

- Location within Southern Ontario
- Location: Hartington, South Frontenac, Ontario, Canada, Ontario, Canada; 44.4578°N 76.6333°W

Impact crater structure
- Confidence: Confirmed
- Diameter: 2.35 kilometers (1.46 mi)
- Depth: 244 meters (801 ft)
- Impactor diameter: 100 meters (330 ft)
- Age: 550 ± 100 million years
- Exposed: No
- Drilled: Yes
- Topo map: 031C07 SYDENHAM

The Holleford Crater is a meteorite crater near the community of Holleford, part of South Frontenac, Ontario, Canada. It is 2.35 kilometres (1.5 mi) in diameter and the age is estimated to be 550 ± 100 million years (Ediacaran or Cambrian). Although there is a surface depression over the area, the crater itself is not exposed at the surface.

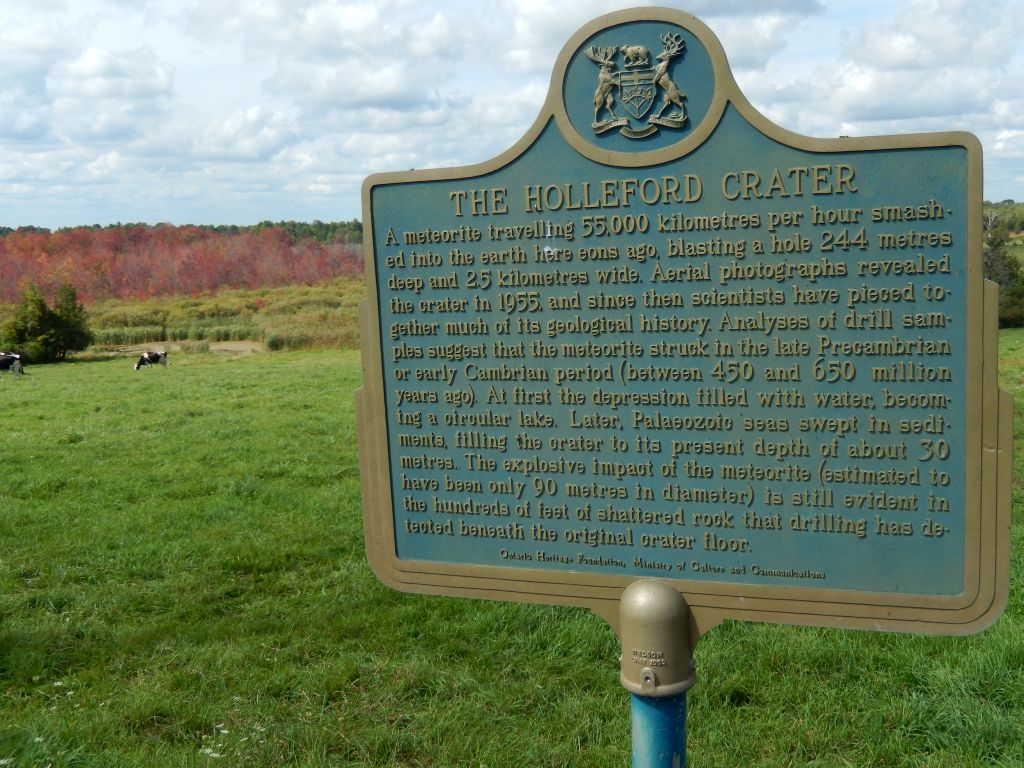
The plaque at the crater site.

Holleford Crater was discovered in the 1950s during analysis of aerial photographs under the direction of Carlyle S. Beals of the Dominion Observatory in Ottawa. In the late 1950s, the Geological Survey of Canada conducted a series of four geophysical studies: magnetic observations, seismic studies, gravity studies, and a diamond drilling program. The seismic and gravity studies and the drilling all produced data consistent with the impact theory. The drill core revealed breccia and similar materials at predicted depths. The studies concluded that an ancient meteorite impact crater is present in the Precambrian bedrock below the surface. The meteorite was estimated to be approximately 100 metres (330 ft) in diameter and to have impacted at approximately 55,000 kilometres per hour (34,000 mph).

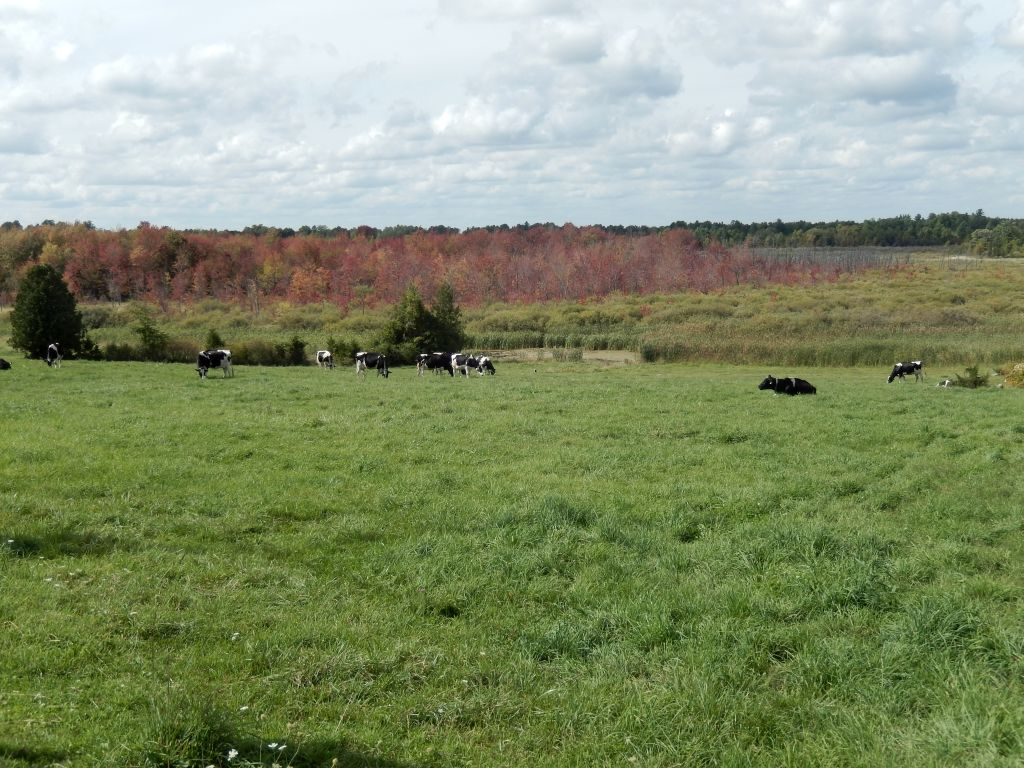
The crater today.

== Location ==
Holleford Crater is located on the Babcook Family Homestead Farm properties (including the original Babcook Homestead Farm, established 1803, owned by the family of the late Frederick and Jean Babcook, at Hartington, Ontario (about 1/2 hour north of Kingston Ontario). (It was the birthplace of the last surviving veteran of the Canadian army in World War One, Jack Babcock, who died on February 18, 2010, at the age of 109.) Starting in the 1960s, the site has been visited frequently by geology students from Queen's University, at Kingston. In the 1970s, as a result of efforts by the late Frederick Babcook, an official commemorative plaque was erected along the road beside the Babcook Homestead Farm by the Province of Ontario. Queen's University's Miller Hall Museum of Geology maintains a display dedicated to the Holleford Meteorite Crater.
