= 146th Battalion, CEF =

146th Canadian Battalion (Ontario Regiment), CEF
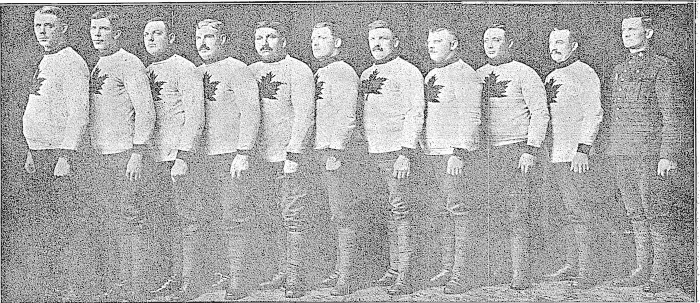
- Members of the 146th Battalion tug-of-war team. Their names and weights are :—Sergt. H. Filson 221 lbs., Sergt. J. McGrath 190 lbs,, Corpl. C. Saunders 204 lbs., Pvfe. D. Rae 215 lbs., Pvte. N. Williams 228 lbs., Sergt-Major J. Crawford 206 lbs., Corpl J. Norton 197 lbs,, Sergt. H. Titford 200 lbs, Pvte. J, Hingey 203 lbs., Pvte. J. Ewart 175 lbs., Sergt.-Major Fisher (team captain) 175 lbs.
- Active: 1915-October 6, 1916
- Country: Canada
- Type: battalion of the Canadian Expeditionary Force
- Garrison/HQ: Kingston, Ontario

The 146th Battalion, CEF was a unit in the Canadian Expeditionary Force during the First World War.

Based in Kingston, Ontario, the unit began recruiting in late 1915 in that city and the surrounding district. After sailing to England in September 1916, the battalion was absorbed into the 95th Battalion, CEF and the 12th Reserve Battalion on October 6, 1916. The 146th Battalion, CEF had one Officer Commanding: Lieut-Col. Charles Adamson Low.

The last Canadian World War I veteran, John Babcock, joined the 146th Battalion, before being transferred to the Young Soldiers Battalion as he was underage.

== Perpetuation ==
The 146th Battalion, CEF was first perpetuated by The Frontenac Regiment and later after it was converted to artillery in 1936 by the 33rd Medium Artillery Regiment, RCA (currently on the Supplementary Order of Battle).

== Music ==
"I'll miss the girl: the regimental song of the 146th overseas battalion" by John E. Harte (music & words) and Charles E. Millner (arrangement) was published in Winnipeg and Toronto by Whaley, Royce & Co., circa 1916. First line: "I'm going to fight for my country, dear" Chorus: "I'll miss the girl".

== See also ==
- List of infantry battalions in the Canadian Expeditionary Force
