= Dwight Wilson (veteran) =

Canadian war veteran (1901–2007)

- Born: February 26, 1901; Vienna, Ontario, Canada
- Died: May 9, 2007 (aged 106); Toronto, Ontario, Canada
- Occupation: Soldier

Percy "Dwight" Wilson (February 26, 1901 – May 9, 2007) was the second-last surviving Canadian veteran of the First World War.

== Biography ==
Born in Vienna, Ontario, he signed up as a 15-year-old boy in 1916. When asked about his actual age, he told the recruiting officer 16, which was good enough for the Canadian Expeditionary Force. On the two-week voyage crossing the North Atlantic to England, he entertained the other troops on the RMS Grampian liner by singing.

On his arrival, Wilson's youth was quickly discovered, and did not get a chance to visit the battlefield, as he was returned to Canada in 1917. Still determined, he enlisted again and wound up once more at Camp Petawawa for military training. The war overseas ended before he got another chance.

Wilson and his wife Eleanor were married in 1927, and they stayed together until she died at the age of 94. They had two sons, Dean and Paul.

Shortly after the Second World War began, Wilson enlisted for a third time. This time, however, due to his old age, he was unable to participate in the war. He spent the war as a captain in the Perth County Reserves.

Wilson lived at Sunnybrook Health Sciences Centre in the Veterans Residence in Toronto for the last year of his life. He died at the age of 106 from complications of a broken hip, which had occurred two weeks earlier. His death left John Babcock, who lived in Spokane, Washington, United States, as the only surviving Canadian veteran of the First World War.
