= Simcoe Island =

Island in southeastern Canada

- Interactive map of Simcoe Island

Geography
- Location: Lake Ontario
- Coordinates: 44°10′05″N 76°31′27″W
- Archipelago: Thousand Islands

Administration
- Canada
- Province: Ontario
- County: Frontenac County
- Township: Frontenac Islands

Demographics
- Population: 82 (2017)

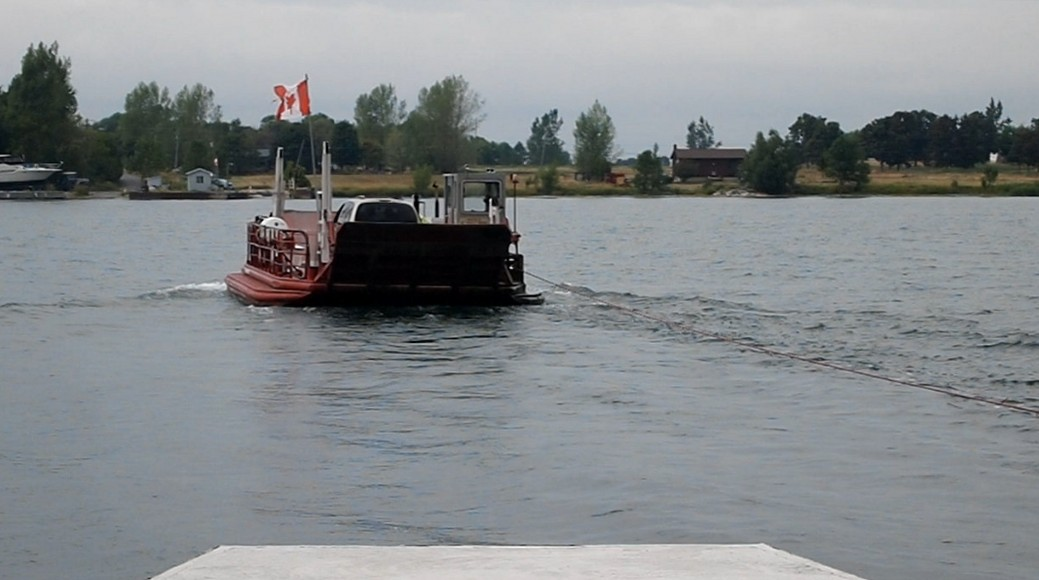
Cable ferry from Wolfe Island to Simcoe Island

Simcoe Island is a small island approximately six kilometres (3.7 mi) long, and one point five kilometres (0.93 mi) across at its widest point, in Lake Ontario, just off Wolfe Island, close to Kingston, Ontario, and Amherst Island.

The island is almost completely farmland and can be reached by ferry from Wolfe Island. Part of Frontenac County, it forms the township of Frontenac Islands, Ontario with Wolfe Island and Howe Island, together with smaller, privately owned islands, Garden Island and Horseshoe Island.

On 16 July 1792, scant months after the partition of Quebec into the provinces of Upper Canada and Lower Canada, Lieutenant Governor of Upper Canada John Graves Simcoe named the archipelago at the head of the St. Lawrence River for the victorious generals at the Battle of the Plains of Abraham: James Wolfe, Jefferey Amherst, William Howe, Guy Carleton and Thomas Gage. The last is now known as Simcoe Island.

Although the island was originally named Isle de Foret ("Forest Island") by early French settlers, most of the trees on the island have been removed for farming, with the exception of small isolated forests and trees. The name Gage Island was also used for a period of time. The name Simcoe was given to the island in honour of John Graves Simcoe.

The two main points of interest on the island are the cable ferry, one of the smallest in Ontario (holding a maximum of 8 cars), and the Nine Mile Point Lighthouse, accessible by the island's only main dirt road, Nine Mile Point Road, Built in 1833 by master stonemason Robert Matthews, the lighthouse is one of the earliest examples of an "Imperial" lighthouse in North America. In continuous operation since it was completed nearly two centuries ago, not only is the Nine Mile Point Lighthouse the oldest active Canadian lighthouse on the Great Lakes, it has the distinction of being one of the oldest active lighthouses in the entire Western Hemisphere.

For most of its nearly two centuries of service this lighthouse was operated and maintained by light keepers some of whose descendants still live on the island. The light was automated in 1987 and today, in addition to its role as an active lighthouse, it serves as a memorial to the many lives lost and ships sunk off its shores in the "Graveyard of Lake Ontario", including Comet, a paddle steamer from the United States, Aloha, a 171-foot (52 m)-long vessel, and Effie Mae, which collided with Aloha.
