= John Babcock =

Canadian World War I veteran (1900–2010)

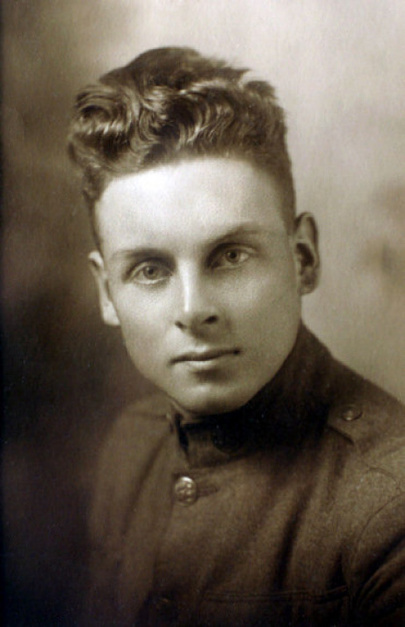
- Babcock in 1920
- Born: July 23, 1900; Holleford, South Frontenac, Ontario, Canada
- Died: February 18, 2010 (aged 109); Spokane, Washington, U.S.
- Military career
- Allegiance: Canada (World War I); United States (Post-World War I)
- Branch: Canadian Expeditionary Force; United States Army
- Service years: 1916–1918
- Rank: Acting lance corporal (Canadian Army); Sergeant (United States Army)
- Nickname: Jack
- Units: 146th Battalion, CEF (Canada); Young Soldiers Battalion (Canada); Homeguard (USA)
- Conflicts: World War I
- Other work: Following the First World War, he became trained as an electrician, and later emigrated to the United States, where he eventually enlisted in the United States Army.

Signature
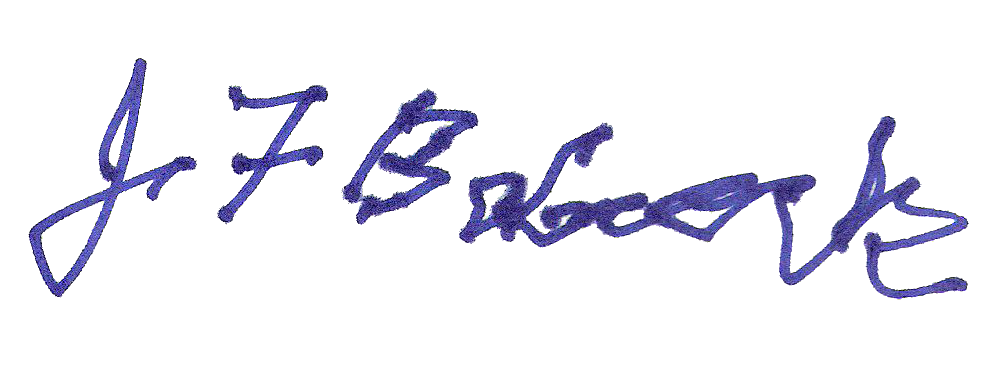

John Henry Foster Babcock (July 23, 1900 – February 18, 2010) was a Canadian electrician and soldier. At age 109, he was the last known surviving veteran of the Canadian military to have served in the First World War and, after the death of Harry Patch, was the conflict's oldest surviving veteran. Babcock first attempted to join the army at the age of fifteen, but was turned down and sent to work in Halifax until he was placed in the Young Soldiers Battalion in August 1917. Babcock was then transferred to the United Kingdom, where he continued his training until the end of the war.

Having never seen combat, Babcock did not consider himself a veteran and moved to the United States in the 1920s, where he joined the United States Army and eventually became an electrician. In May 2007, following the death of Dwight Wilson, he became the last surviving veteran of the First World War who served with the Canadian forces. From that point he received international attention, including 109th birthday greetings from Queen Elizabeth II, the Governor General of Canada and the Canadian Prime Minister, until his death on February 18, 2010.

== Early life ==
Babcock was born on July 23, 1900, into a family of thirteen children on a farm in Frontenac County, Ontario. According to Babcock, the barn where he was born (which no longer exists) was located off Highway 38 in South Frontenac Township. His father died in 1906 after a tree-cutting accident, when Babcock was only six years old. As described in his account given to Maclean's, while his father was cutting down one tree, another dead tree fell on his shoulder. Although he was brought into the house on bobsleigh, he only survived another two hours. Babcock said that this was an "awful blow" to the family.

School was never a concern for Babcock, and he did not earn his high school diploma until the age of 95. On growing up in the area, Babcock claims that he "didn't do very much," although he admits that "[i]t was a fun place to grow up." Babcock partook in fishing, hunting, and swimming—especially around the local Sydenham Lake—in order to pass the time with the other kids his age. He would return to the area in 1919, after his wartime experiences, but soon after left for the United States. Nevertheless, Babcock's relatives continue to work at the Crater Dairy farm (named after the Holleford crater, a remnant of a meteor strike) and the community grew to greatly respect John.

== World War I ==
At the age of fifteen and a half, Babcock was impressed at Perth Road by two recruiting officers, one a lieutenant and one a sergeant, who quoted from the poem "The Charge of the Light Brigade". He was also enticed by the offered salary, which was $1.10 per day, as opposed to the 50 cents he could have made through physical labour. Babcock was recruited in Sydenham, Ontario and joined the 146th Battalion of the Canadian Expeditionary Force. He was then sent to Valcartier, Quebec. There Babcock underwent a physical, where it was discovered that he was underage. He was designated status A-4: physically fit, but underage. At the time, the minimum age for combat was eighteen. Babcock was turned down, but managed to make it all the way to Halifax by train before he was stopped by the company commander.

In Halifax he was sent to Wellington Barracks, the city's peacetime barracks, where he wrestled freight onto large army vehicles and dug ditches. Tired of the work, Babcock took the opportunity to volunteer for the Royal Canadian Regiment when fifty recruits were called on, claiming that his age was 18. Officials quickly discovered that he was only 16, however, and they placed him in a reserve battalion known as the Boys (or Young Soldiers) Battalion in August 1917. Babcock then undertook an ocean voyage to England and, in Liverpool, he was stationed with the 26th Reserve and sent to Bexhill-on-Sea where he trained with about 1,300 others, about a third of whom were veterans from battles in France.

The Young Soldiers Battalion trained the recruits for eight hours a day. In his spare time Babcock went on leave to Scotland, where he met his first girlfriend, a woman from the Women's Army Auxiliary Corps. He was also introduced to the pleasures of beer and the horrors of war that some of the older veterans had come across. Babcock asserts that he would have fought in the conflict, given the chance, but the war ended before he could be brought to the front lines. For this reason, Babcock claims that he never felt like "a real soldier" and rarely talked of his experiences until his centenary. He also never joined any veterans associations.

=== Experiences ===
Babcock's brother Manley enlisted after John and served with the Canadian Military Engineers as a sapper. Manley suffered a nervous breakdown after the war. This, in Babcock's eyes, was one of many psychological problems that occurred during and after the war. He recalled at least one instance where a soldier shot himself with a .45 after his comrades discovered that he had emigrated from Germany, while another ran himself through with a bayonet after a pack drill. Babcock also recounted the importance of honesty in the Canadian Army. In one case, one of his comrades stole a dollar watch and received nine months in prison and Babcock cited that as an example of the strict discipline in the military structure. By March 1918 he had been promoted to acting corporal, but was reduced to the rank of private for neglect of duty. By October of that year, however, he had been restored to acting lance corporal. Soldiers holding acting ranks in the Canadian forces receive the salary and allowances of the rank, but can be restored to a previous rank at any time due to their lack of the necessary training or experience to hold that position permanently. In Canada during wartime, individuals could be promoted to acting ranks in order to meet service requirements.

== After the First World War ==
With relatives in the United States, Babcock paid the $7 head tax and moved there in 1921. He received a Canadian Army pension that totaled $750 shortly after the conflict and took advantage of veteran vocational training in his native country to become an electrician. He ran a small light plant in his home neighbourhood of Sydenham, and later had a career as an industrial supply salesman in the United States.

He became a United States citizen in 1946 after serving in the United States Army and achieving the rank of sergeant. In so doing, he lost his Canadian citizenship, as Canadian law prior to 1977 limited dual citizenship. After the attack on Pearl Harbor on December 7, 1941, he attempted to sign up for active duty with the army's flying service (the United States Air Force was not formed until 1947), but was turned down for being too old. He therefore spent World War II in the United States Army and among his duty stations was Fort Lewis, located in Tacoma, Washington.

At the age of 65, Babcock became a pilot. As of 2006 he was in good mental and physical health, displayed by his ability to quickly recite the alphabet backwards, spell out his name in Morse Code, and take daily walks with his wife to keep in shape. At the age of 100 he wrote an autobiography titled Ten Decades of John Foster Babcock. It was distributed only to family and friends.

Babcock was married twice, first to Elsie, then to Dorothy, a woman nearly thirty years his junior whom he met when she was taking care of his first wife while she was dying. Babcock had one son (Jack Jr.) and one daughter (Sandra). One grandchild, Matt, was an army dentist in Iraq during the Iraq War. John and Dorothy resided in Spokane, Washington, where Babcock lived from 1932 until his death. Babcock was not the only centenarian in his family; his younger sister Lucy died in July 2007 at the age of 102.

== Last surviving Canadian veteran ==
From the death of Dwight Wilson on May 9, 2007, Babcock was the last known Canadian veteran of the First World War. He was proud of his status as the last surviving Canadian World War I veteran, although he did not feel the need to be honoured in a specific state funeral. Instead, he was of the opinion that "they should commemorate all of them, instead of just one." He was also quoted as saying "I'm sure that all the attention I'm getting isn't because of anything spectacular I've done. It's because I'm the last one."

Nevertheless, Babcock received much attention on the occasion of his 107th birthday, with wishes from Queen Elizabeth II as Queen of Canada (who Babcock joked is a "nice looking gal"), Governor General Michaëlle Jean, Prime Minister Stephen Harper, and Foreign Affairs Minister Peter MacKay. James Moore, a Member of Parliament from British Columbia, visited Babcock personally to deliver gifts and greetings. For his birthday, Babcock and his wife went to Rosauers for his favourite meal of hamburgers and French fries. Among the gifts he received was a necktie adorned with a poppy pattern, a symbol of the First World War. In his hometown of South Frontenac, mayor Gary Davison sent a letter of congratulations, while the local coffee shop named their local blend, "The Jack", after him.

Babcock was invited to the opening of a Pentagon exhibit on March 6, 2008, featuring photos of nine First World War veterans, but was unable to attend. At the time he was one of only two of the veterans pictured to be alive, along with American Frank Buckles, who did participate in the event. In 2008, he was visited by Canadian officials and wrote to Prime Minister Stephen Harper that he was interested in regaining his Canadian citizenship in a letter that was hand-delivered to him in a cabinet meeting. The request was approved by the Prime Minister and the paperwork was signed by Governor General Michaëlle Jean, after which officials from Citizenship and Immigration Canada were flown to Spokane to complete the swearing in ceremony. That same year, Babcock participated in the Canadian Remembrance Day ceremonies, appearing via video to symbolically pass the torch of remembrance, urging people to "hold it high". Babcock credited his longevity to the intense physical training that he received in both the United States and Canadian armies.

Babcock died on February 18, 2010, in Spokane, Washington, at the age of 109, having been housebound since October 2009 following a case of pneumonia. He was cremated and his remains were scattered across the Pacific Northwest. Governor General Jean and Prime Minister Harper made statements of condolence shortly after his death and, on the anniversary of the Battle of Vimy Ridge (April 9), Canada's monarch, Queen Elizabeth II, issued a statement marking the two events, stating: "As proud and grateful Canadians, we pause today to mark not only the ninety-third anniversary of this Nation's victory at Vimy Ridge but also to pay tribute to the passing of a truly remarkable generation who helped to end the most terrible conflict the world had ever known." The local Royal Canadian Legion in Sydenham, Ontario has a collection of First World War items on display, including a roll call with Babcock's name on it, in his honour.

== See also ==
- List of last surviving Canadian war veterans
- List of last surviving World War I veterans by country
- List of veterans of World War I who died in 2009–12
