= Wolfe Islander III =

Canadian ferry

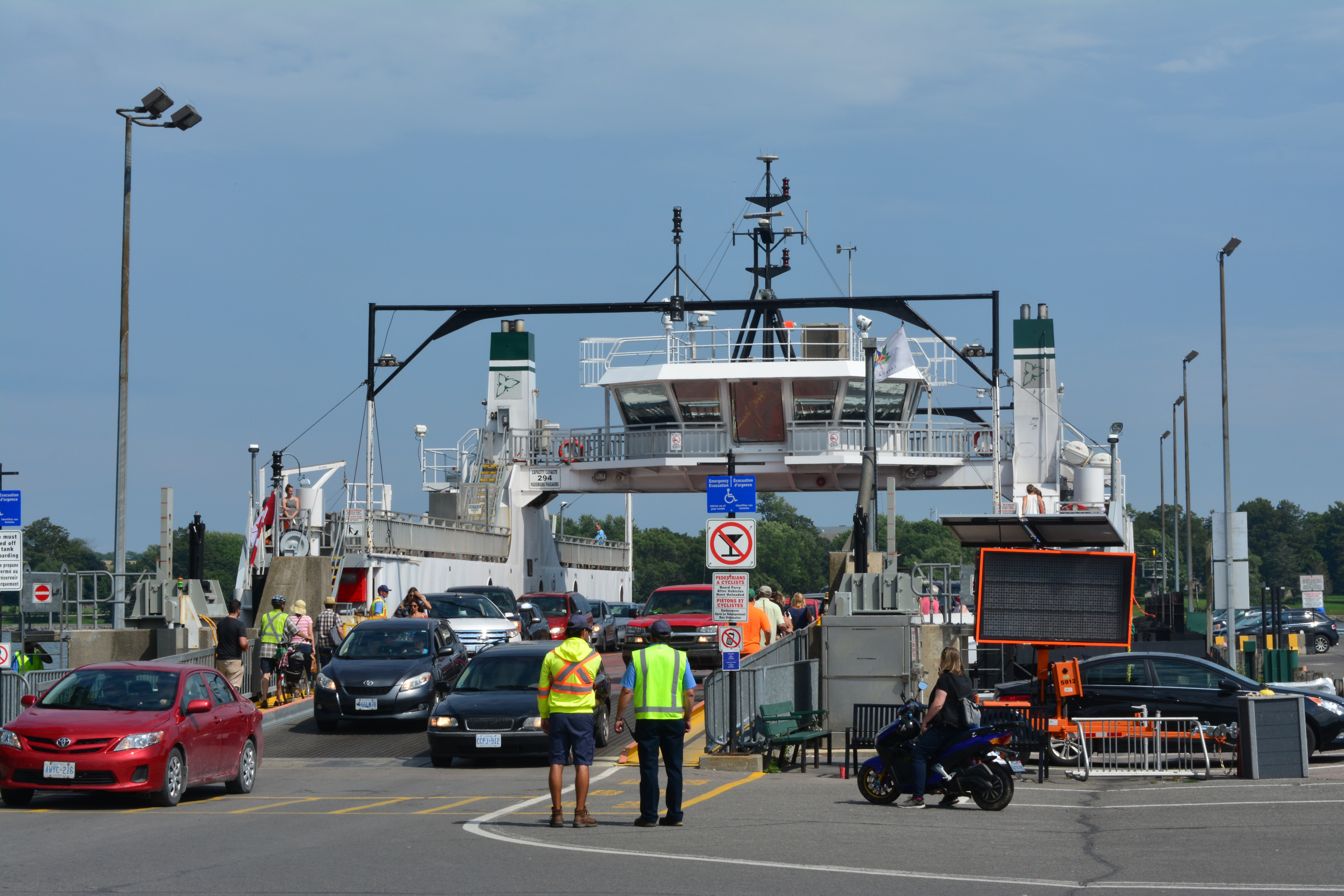
- Vehicles loading off Wolfe Islander III at the ferry docks in Kingston harbour.

History
- Name: Wolfe Islander III
- Owner: Ontario Government
- Operator: Ministry of Transportation
- Port of registry: (Canada) Kingston, Ontario
- Route: Kingston, Ontario and Wolfe Island (Ontario)
- Cost: $17.1 million
- Laid down: 5 August 1973
- Launched: 1 September 1973
- Christened: 1 February 1975
- Completed: 1 January 1975
- Acquired: 1 February 1976
- Maiden voyage: 2 February 1976
- In service: 5 February 1976
- Identification: IMO number: 7423079; MMSI number: 316013007; Callsign: VA3418
- Status: In service

General characteristics
- Tonnage: 1,550 GT; 1,150 NT
- Displacement: 660 tons (empty); 990 tons (part load/half load); 1,490 tons (full load)
- Length: 200 ft (61 m)
- Beam: 65 ft (19.8 m)
- Draught: 6 ft (1.8 m)
- Depth: 11.5 ft (3.5 m)
- Decks: 2
- Deck clearance: 18 ft 6 inch (5.64 m)
- Ramps: 2
- Installed power: 1,850 bhp (1,380 kW)
- Propulsion: 2 x LM1900 Diesel units; 4 × Caterpillar 3412 12 cylinder, 2,200 HP diesel engines
- Speed: 18 knots (33.34 km/h)
- Capacity: 55 cars & 296 passengers
- Crew: 6

Wolfe Islander III is the ferry currently serving between Kingston, Ontario and Wolfe Island. She can hold approximately 55 cars, and is end-loading. The length of the car deck is 61 metres (200 feet). The vehicle height restriction is 4.4 m (14 feet, 5 inches). As it is the only public access to Wolfe Island, the vessel operates as a free ferry. Crossing time is approximately 20 minutes. She was launched into service on 5 February 1976 by then Ontario Minister of Transportation, James W. Snow.

The previous ferry in service was Wolfe Islander II.

The ferry terminal on Wolfe Island varied by season until the fall of 2020. During the summer season (approximately April to December), the Marysville dock was used, while during the winter season (December to April), the Dawson’s Point dock was used, located 4.8 km (3.0 mi) east of Marysville. During the three-year reconstruction of the Barrack Street Dock in Kingston and the Marysville dock on Wolfe Island, the Dawson's Point dock will be used year-round on the Wolfe Island side. The route used to include a bubbler system that stretched to the Barrack Street Dock in Kingston, Ontario. It became non-operational for several years, and the machinery was removed in the fall of 2020 during Barrack Street dock reconstruction at Kingston.

The Kingston Terminal is located at the foot of Barrack Street, at Ontario Street.

In 2017, the Ontario provincial government ordered a new battery electric powered 98 metres (322 ft) ferry with a capacity of 399 people and 75 vehicles from Damen Group to operate the Wolfe Island route. That new ferry, the Wolfe Islander IV was to have begun operations in April 2022 as the new vessel is compatible with both the existing and new dock and ramp infrastructure.
