= Wolfe Island =

Island in the St Lawrence River, Ontario, Canada

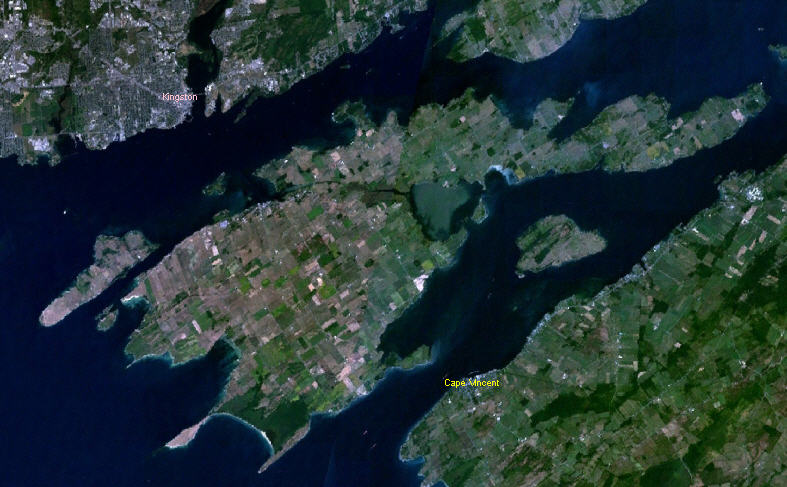
- NASA image of Wolfe Island. Kingston, Ontario is in the upper left of the image and upstate New York is the landmass in the right corner.
- Interactive map of Wolfe Island

Geography
- Location: Lake Ontario
- Coordinates: 44°10′N 76°22′W
- Area: 124 km^{2} (48 sq mi)

Administration
- Canada
- Province: Ontario
- County: Frontenac County
- Township: Frontenac Islands
- Largest settlement: Marysville

Demographics
- Population: 1,400

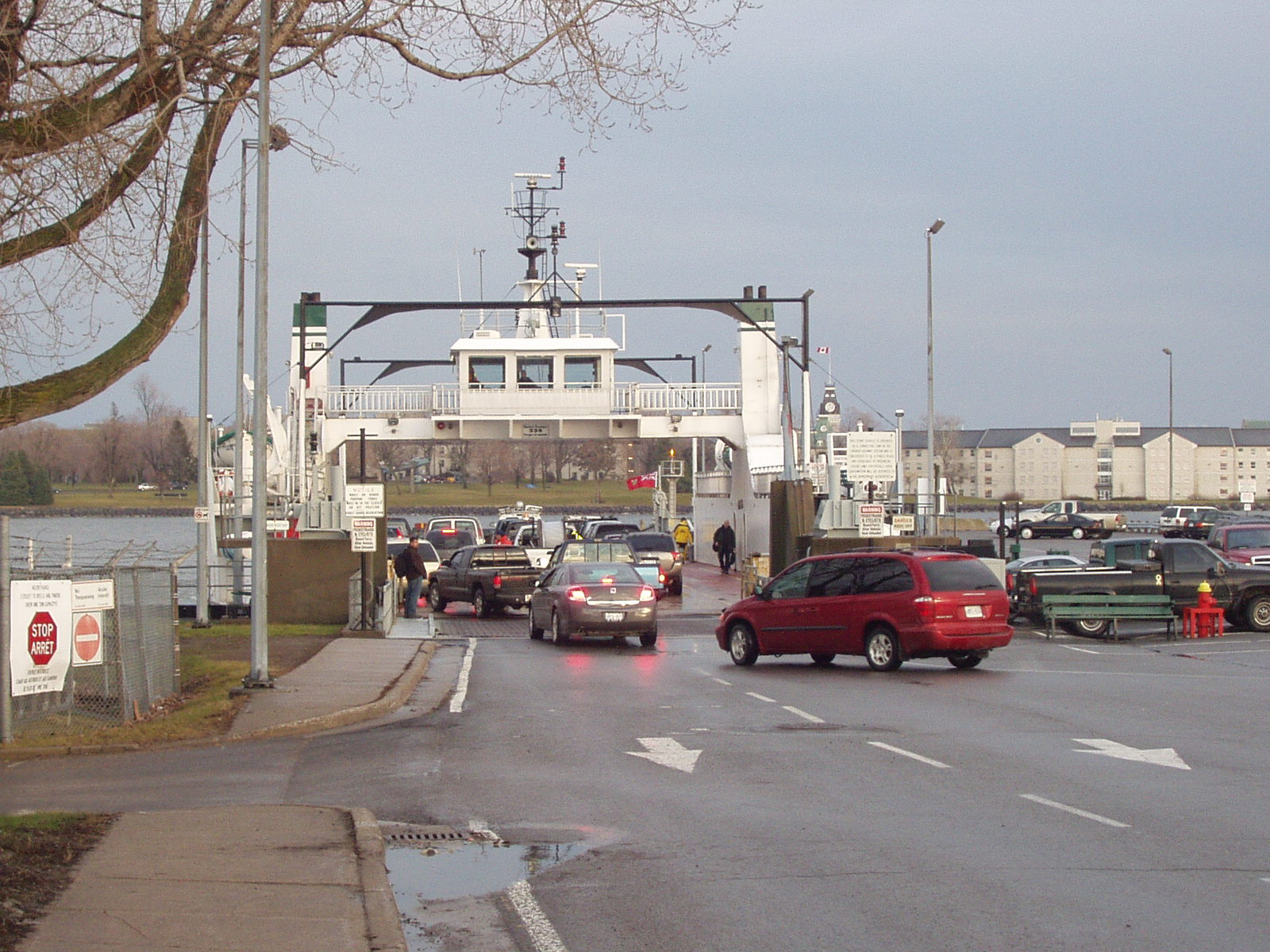
Vehicles loading onto the Wolfe Islander III at the Wolfe Island Ferry Terminal in downtown Kingston.

Wolfe Island is the largest of the Thousand Islands, and is located at the entrance to the St. Lawrence River in Lake Ontario. It is a piece of land situated between Kingston, Ontario and Cape Vincent, New York. Wolfe Island is included in Frontenac County and the Township of Frontenac Islands. The largest settlement on the island is the village of Marysville.

The island is about 29 kilometres (18 miles) long, with its width varying from around 9 kilometres (6 miles) to a few hundred metres at some points; its area is about 124 square kilometres (48 square miles).

The resident population is about 1,400 people but can double or triple in summer.

== History ==
The island was part of the traditional hunting lands of the Tyendinaga Mohawk people and the original name of the island is Kawehnóhkwes tsi kawè:note ("Long Island Standing"). The name is often given as "Ganounkouesnot", but this name makes no sense in the Tyendinaga Mohawk language. In 2021, the Township of Frontenac Islands voted officially to accept the name of Kawehnóhkwes tsi kawè:note and added it to the signs welcoming visitors to Wolfe Island. It was called Grand Island (Grande île) by the French. In a proclamation by the Lieutenant Governor of Upper Canada John Graves Simcoe on 16 July 1792, the island was renamed from Grand Island to Wolfe Island, after British General James Wolfe.

A scheme to ship goods from Cape Vincent, New York to Kingston in the mid-19th century by connecting Canadian and American railway systems required a canal to be dug across the island. Since there was no direct railway link across the channels to the north and south of the island, boats were needed to ship the goods. A system of steamships towing barges carrying railway cars across the channels and through the canal was planned. Construction started in 1852. Although completed, the canal did not serve its intended purpose and stopped being used by 1892.

It has been the site of various cheese factories, including one once operated by Kraft Foods.

== Infrastructure ==
Wolfe Island has a Canada Post office (K0H 2Y0) and telephone exchange (+1-613-385-).

Wolfe Island can be accessed by ferry from Canada and the United States. The ferry from Kingston (Wolfe Islander III) is operated by the Ministry of Transportation (MTO) and is free of charge. This ferry operates from two locations: the Summer Dock located in Marysville and the Winter Dock located at Dawson Point. This route includes an underwater air bubbler system that stretches to the Barrack Street Dock in Kingston, Ontario, whose purpose is to prevent ice buildup along the ferry's route in winter. This ferry service is currently being examined in an ongoing transportation study. The seasonal Horne's Ferry (May to October) toll ferry to Cape Vincent, New York, first licensed in 1802, is still operated by the descendants of the first licence-holder and is one of the rare Canada-US international border crossings to be privately operated (the others are the Windsor-Detroit's Ambassador Bridge and Sombra–Marine City (Bluewater) Ferry).

A third ferry runs seasonally to join Wolfe Island to Simcoe Island.

Wolfe Island is the site of most Kingston radio transmitters; CKWS TV and radio, CKLC, CIKR and CFRC transmit from the island.

It is the site of the Wolfe Island Wind Farm, a 197.8 MW wind farm consisting of 86 wind turbines, which has been in operation since 2009.

== Flora and fauna ==
Snowy owls are frequently seen on the island during winter. It is also an important stopover location for migrating waterfowl including swans in spring and fall. Wolfe Island is also home to a growing population of wild turkeys, white-tailed deer, and other fauna. It is designated an Important Bird Area.

The Big Sandy Bay Management Area on Wolfe Island is a 404-hectare property, classified as a provincially significant life sciences Area of Natural and Scientific Interest. Sand dunes and wetlands allow rare plant species to flourish here. Rare trees and birds deemed to be significant either regionally or provincially are also found here. The environmental area is protected and no motorized vehicles are allowed, though ample free parking is provided at the entrance. A well-marked and level walking trail leads to a large, secluded sand beach with shallows reaching out well into Lake Ontario. The beach is safe and family-friendly, but there are no services, so visitors are encouraged to bring their own refreshments and must carry out all garbage and recyclables to dispose of at home.

== Recreation and other facilities ==
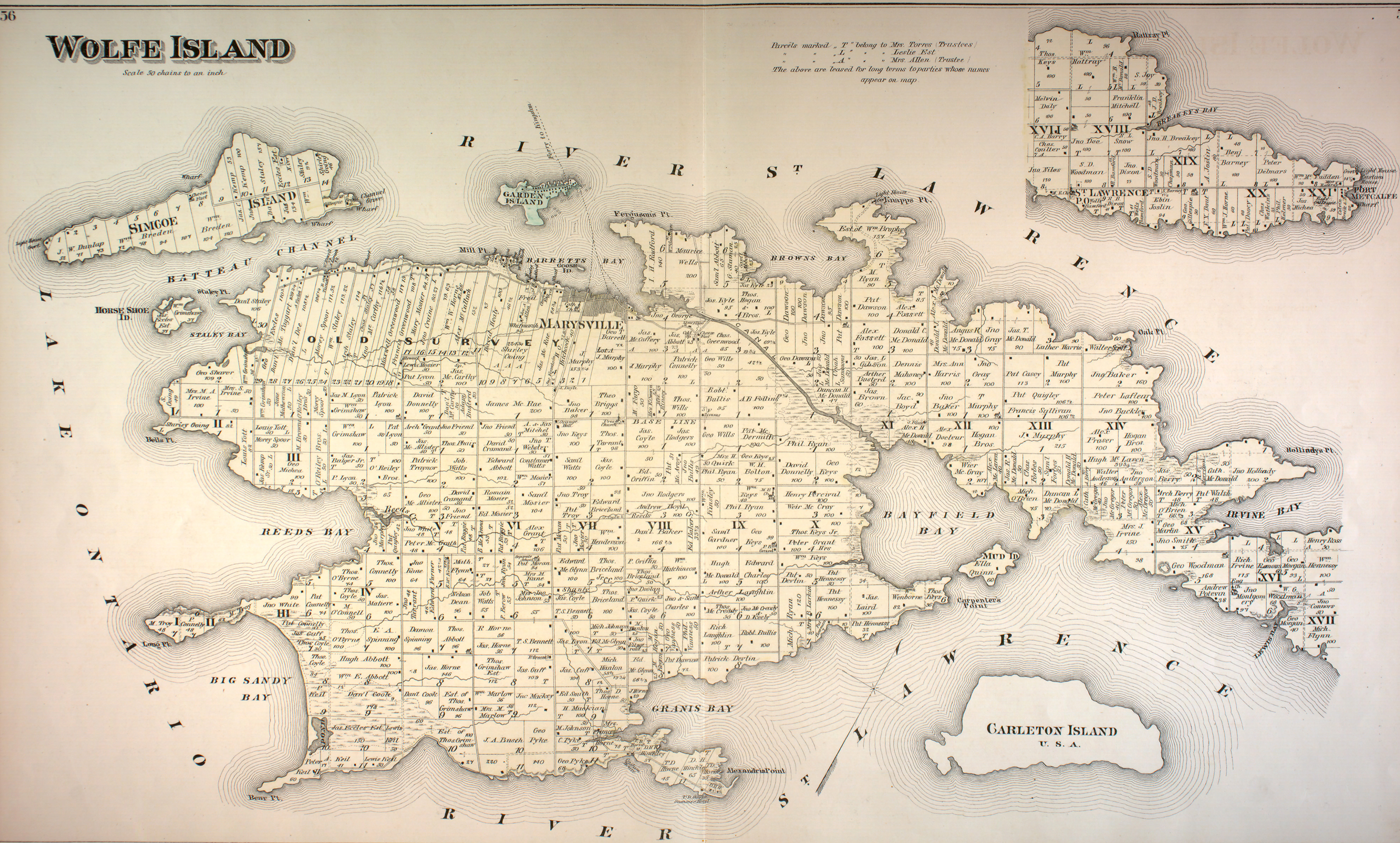
1878 map of Wolfe Island

The Wolfe Island Riverfront Golf Course lies on the south shore of the Island facing the United States and the international shipping channel. This 9 hole, par 35 course has well-manicured fairways and large 5000 sq ft greens.

Wolfe Island attracts cyclists for its cycling routes that pass through farmland and rural landscapes. The County of Frontenac features a map on their website with a list of Wolfe Island Cycling Routes. The newest cycling route was introduced during the summer of 2024 and included in the Great Lakes Waterfront Trail as the Wolfe Island Route which spans 40 kilometers.

The Wolfe Island Community Centre is the central hub for sports and recreation. The property has a playground, three baseball diamonds, an outdoor ice rink with a roof, a soccer field, and an outdoor horse-riding arena utilized by the Wolfe Island Horse Association. The annual Wolfe Island Family Baseball Tournament is hosted here during the August long weekend.

In 2011, the community of Wolfe Island participated in the Kraft Hockeyville competition and won $25,000 in upgrades to the community hockey rink from Kraft.

On the outskirts of Marysville, stands the largest church in the Thousand Islands (Sacred Heart of Mary Church). Across the street is the Wolfe Island Branch of the Kingston Frontenac Public Library (KFPL).

A newly built Wolfe Island Community Medical Clinic opened in the spring of 2010. There is a volunteer fire & rescue department on the island. Additionally, Wolfe Island has Big Sandy Bay Management Area. During the summer months the Old House Museum is operated by community volunteers and members of the Wolfe Island Historical Society. There are two elementary schools on the island: Marysville Public School that is part of the Limestone District School Board and Sacred Heart Catholic School that is part of the Algonquin and Lakeshore Catholic District School Board.

Adjacent to Town Hall in Marysville, the Township operates a tourist information centre seasonally. In 2024, Jean & Aggie’s Ice Cream Shoppe opened in the tourist information building.

The limestone Wolfe Island Town Hall is a National Historic Site of Canada.

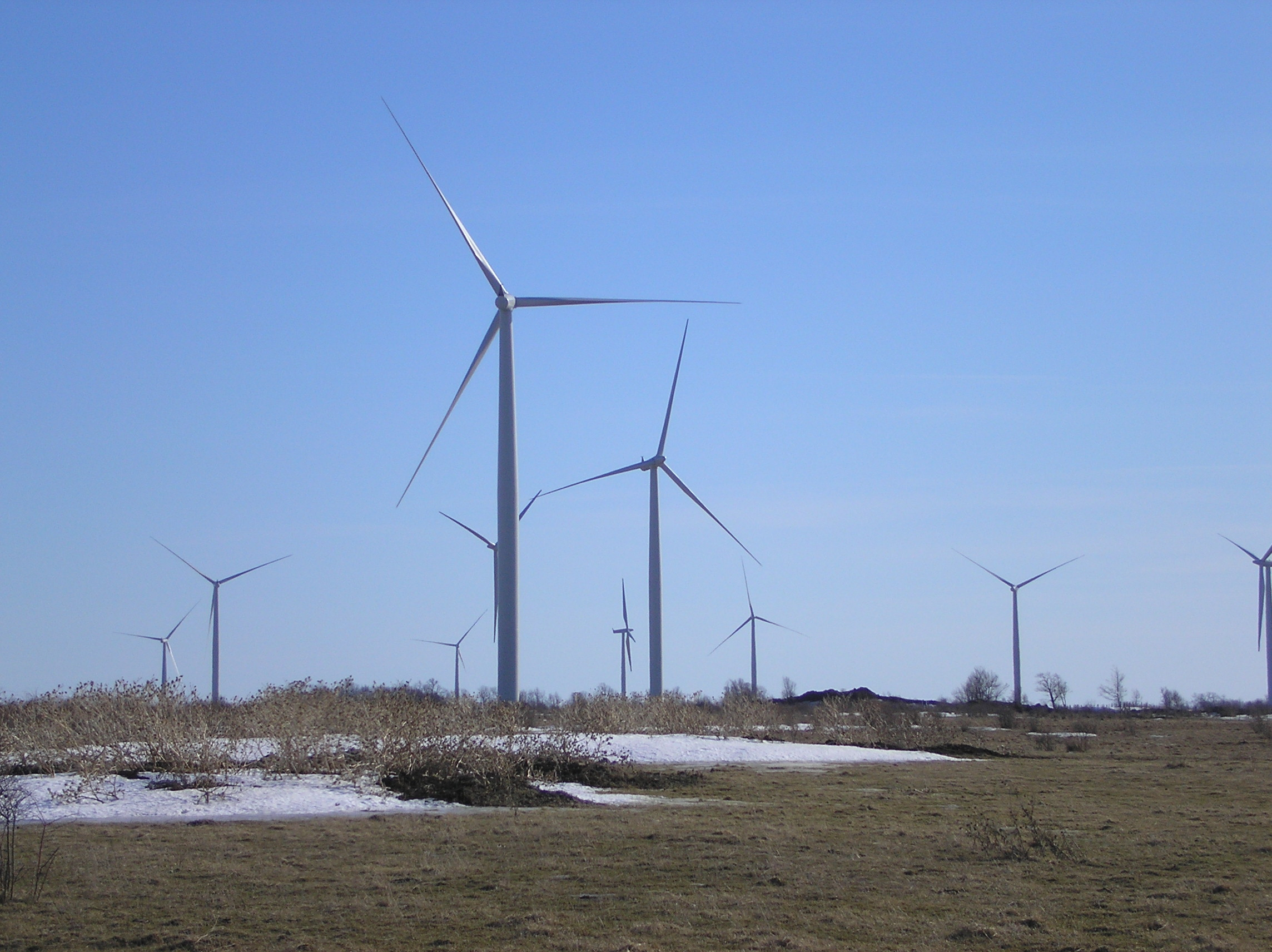
Wolfe Island Wind Farm

== Notable residents ==
- Grant Allen, Canada's first crime writer (1848 - 1899)
- Ken Keyes (politician), former MPP for Kingston and the Islands
- Jim Hulton, hockey coach
- Kristina Walker, rower
- Jason Mercer, musician
- Chris Brown (Canadian musician), musician

== See also ==
- Ontario Highway 95 and 96
- Populated islands of the Great Lakes
- List of townships in Ontario
- List of wind farms in Canada
