= Frontenac Islands =

- Township (lower-tier)
- Township of Frontenac Islands
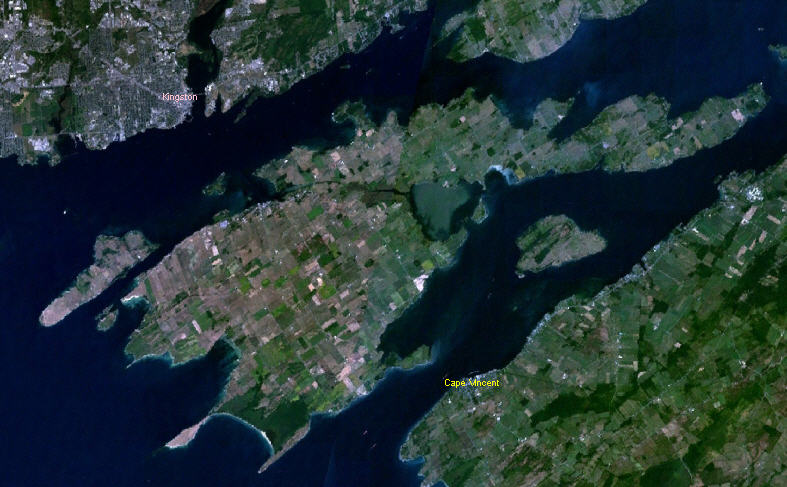
- Satellite view of Frontenac Islands, with Wolfe Island being the largest

- Location within Southern Ontario
- Coordinates: 44°12′N 76°23′W
- Country: Canada
- Province: Ontario
- County: Frontenac
- Incorporated: 1998

Government
  - Type: Township
  - Mayor: Dan Hulton
  - Fed. riding: Kingston and the Islands
  - Prov. riding: Kingston and the Islands

Area
  - Land: 176.82 km^{2} (68.27 sq mi)

Population (2021)
  - Total: 1,930
  - Density: 10.9/km^{2} (28/sq mi)
- Time zone: UTC-5 (EST)
  - Summer (DST): UTC-4 (EDT)
- Postal Code: K0H
- Area codes: 613, 343
- Website: www.frontenacislands.ca

Frontenac Islands is a township located in Frontenac County, Ontario, Canada, that encompasses a number of islands at the beginning of the St. Lawrence River near the outlet of Lake Ontario, including Arabella, Bayfield, Black Ant, Garden, Goose, Hickory, Horseshoe, Howe, Wolfe, and Simcoe.

The township was formed on January 1, 1998, when Howe Island Township and Wolfe Island Township were merged as part of the county's reorganization.

== Communities ==
Of the several islands that make up Frontenac Islands, only three (Wolfe Island, Howe Island, and Simcoe Island ranked in descending order of year-round resident population) have substantial permanent resident populations, and regularly scheduled or on-demand marine ferry service provides year-round vehicle and emergency services access to those islands.

The other islands are accessible only by private boat to privately owned docks. Some of these islands have substantial numbers of homes and cottages, but are generally not populated during the winter months when ice build-up in Lake Ontario and the St. Lawrence River make boat access difficult or impossible.

Only Wolfe Island has a recognizable concentrated settlement: the village of Marysville, with around 400 inhabitants. The rest of the population is dispersed, mostly in lot groupings on or near the island shoreline, but with some housing found along the interior roads on either farm properties or on smaller non-farming lot severances.

In the nineteenth century, the islands had much larger populations. Small population clusters were also found in the Port Alexandria, Port Metcalf and Scotch Settlement areas, all on Wolfe Island. These communities are now no more than names on the map.

Note: There were no "villages" at Port Alexandria, Port Metcalf or the Scotch Settlement. The Scotch Settlement was a farming area encompassing approximately 3,000 acres which was settled in the 1820s by Scottish clansmen moving west from Glengarry county.

== Demographics ==
In the 2021 Census of Population conducted by Statistics Canada, Frontenac Islands had a population of 1,930 living in 903 of its 1,212 total private dwellings, a change of 9.7% from its 2016 population of 1,760. With a land area of 176.82 km^{2} (68.27 sq mi), it had a population density of 10.9/km^{2} (28.3/sq mi) in 2021.

Canada census – Frontenac Islands community profile

	2021	2016	2011
Population	1,930 (+9.7% from 2016)	1,760 (-5.6% from 2011)	1,864 (+0.1% from 2006)
Land area	176.82 km^{2} (68.27 sq mi)	175.04 km^{2} (67.58 sq mi)	175.04 km^{2} (67.58 sq mi)
Population density	10.9/km^{2} (28/sq mi)	10.1/km^{2} (26/sq mi)	10.6/km^{2} (27/sq mi)
Median age	59.6 (M: 59.6, F: 59.6)	55.9 (M: 56.0, F: 55.8)	50.5 (M: 50.4, F: 50.6)
Private dwellings	1,212 (total) 903 (occupied)	1,273 (total)	1,256 (total)
Median household income	$90,000	$80,512

References: 2021 2016 2011

Mother tongue (2021):

- English as first language: 92.0%
- French as first language: 2.6%
- English and French as first language: 0.5%
- Other as first language: 4.4%

Historical census populations – Frontenac Islands
Year	Pop.	±%
1996	1,661	—
2001	1,638	−1.4%
2006	1,862	+13.7%
2011	1,864	+0.1%
2016	1,760	−5.6%
2021	1,930	+9.7%
Source: Statistics Canada

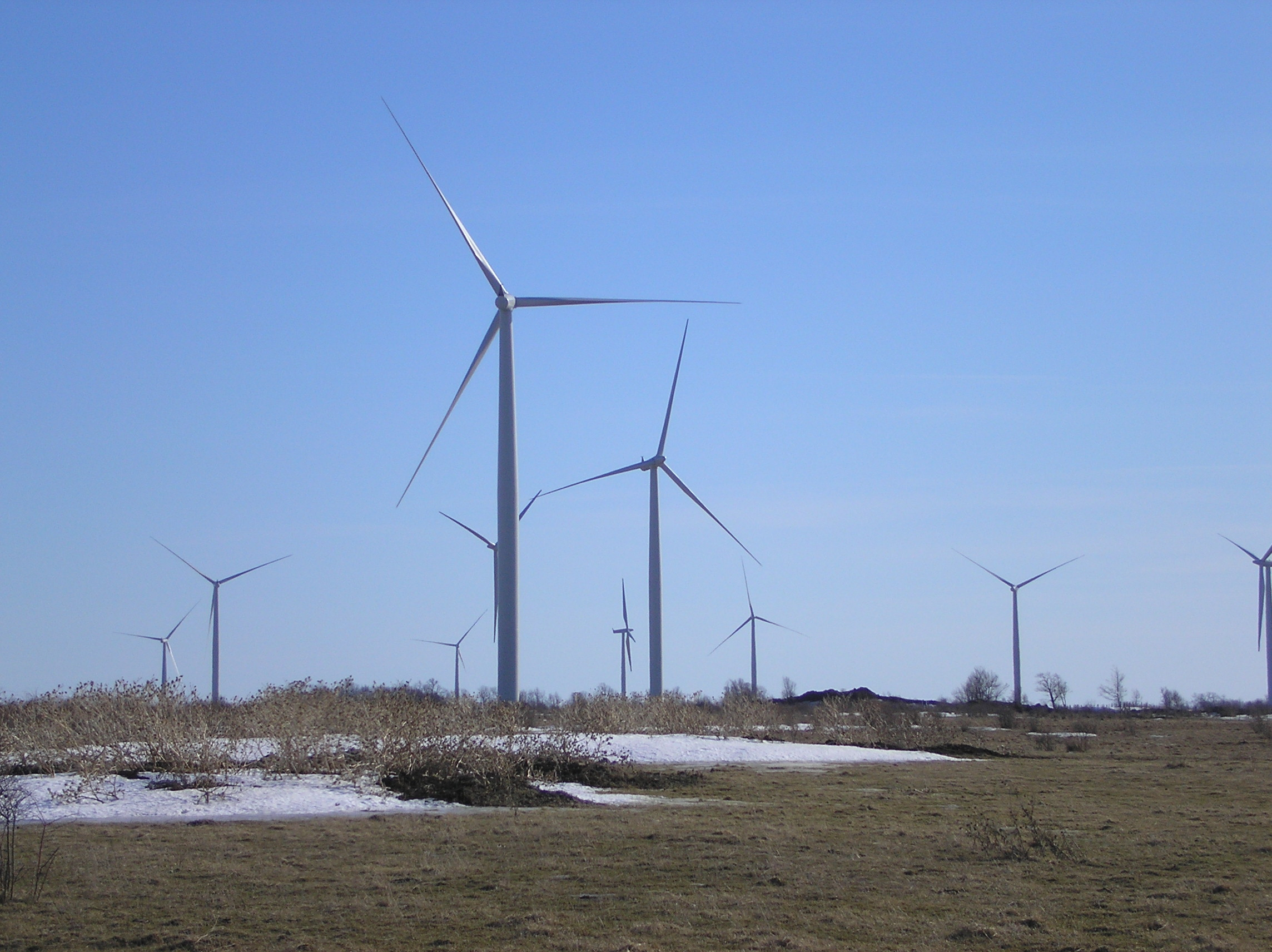
Wolfe Island Wind Farm

== Community groups and organizations ==
There are several community groups and organizations in the Frontenac Islands. On Wolfe Island, these include the Community Medical Clinic, the Wolfe Island Historical Society, the Wolfe Island Commons, and Wolfe Island Friends of Ferals.

== Education ==
The town, along with Central Frontenac, South Frontenac and North Frontenac, sends students to schools part of the Limestone District School Board, based in neighboring Kingston.

== See also ==
- List of townships in Ontario
