= South Frontenac =

Township in Ontario, Canada

- Township (lower-tier)
- Township of South Frontenac
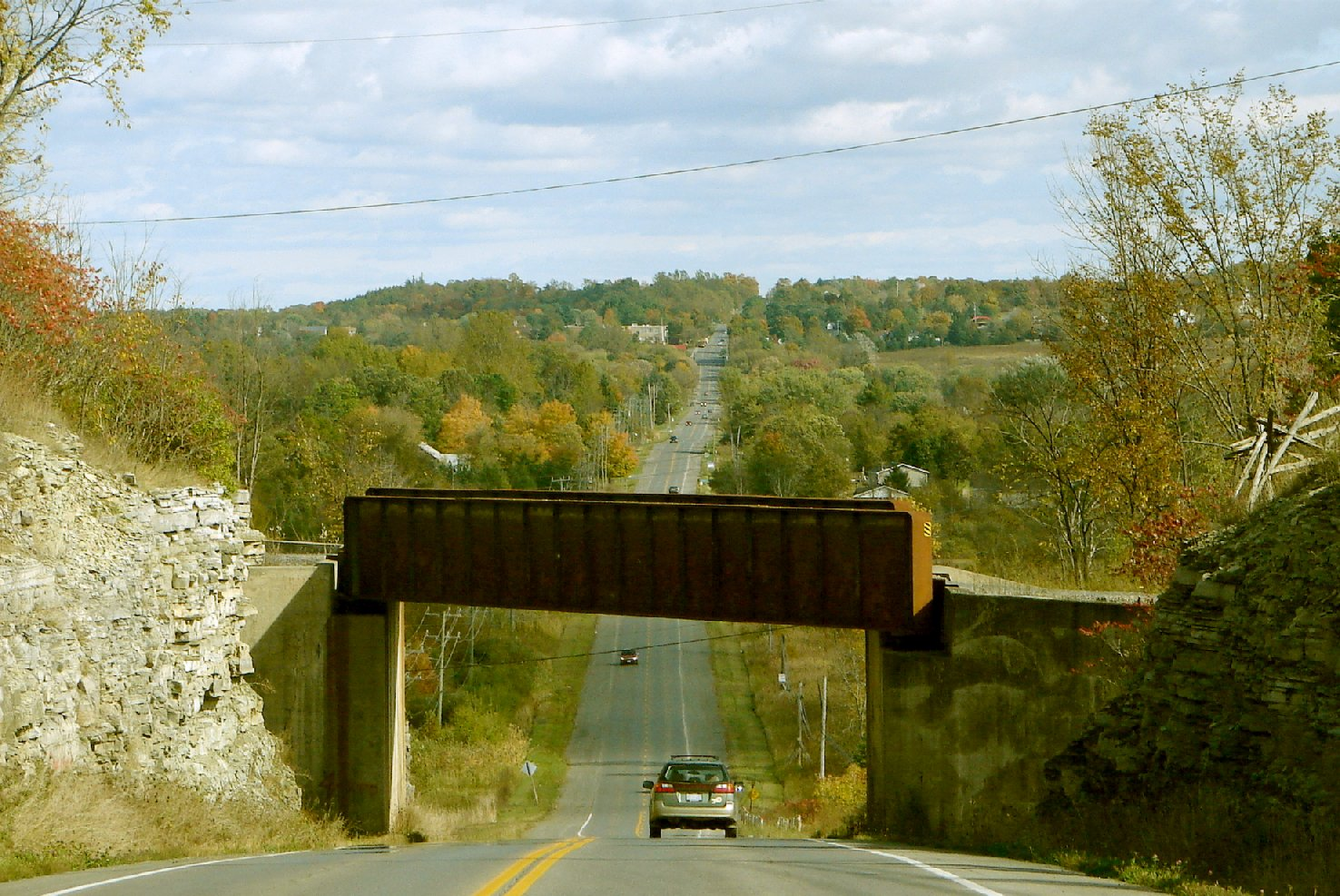
- County Road 5 between Harrowsmith and Sydenham

- Location in southern Ontario
- Coordinates: 44°30′29″N 76°29′38″W
- Country: Canada
- Province: Ontario
- County: Frontenac
- Incorporated: 1998

Government
  - Type: Township
  - Mayor: Ron Vandewal
  - Councillors: List: John McDougal (Bedford); Alan Revill (Bedford); Ray Leonard (Portland); Doug Morey (Portland); Randy Ruttan (Loughborough); Ross Sutherland (Loughborough); Norm Roberts (Storington); Ron Sleeth (Storington)
  - Fed. riding: Lanark—Frontenac
  - Prov. riding: Lanark—Frontenac—Kingston

Area
  - Land: 948.05 km^{2} (366.04 sq mi)

Population (2021)
  - Total: 20,188
  - Density: 21.3/km^{2} (55/sq mi)
- Time zone: UTC-5 (EST)
  - Summer (DST): UTC-4 (EDT)
- Postal Code: K0H
- Area codes: 613, 343
- Website: www.southfrontenac.net

South Frontenac is a township in Frontenac County in eastern Ontario, Canada. It was formed on January 1, 1998, through the amalgamation of the Townships of Bedford, Loughborough, Portland, and Storrington.

The Holleford crater is located in the township near the community of Holleford.

== Communities ==
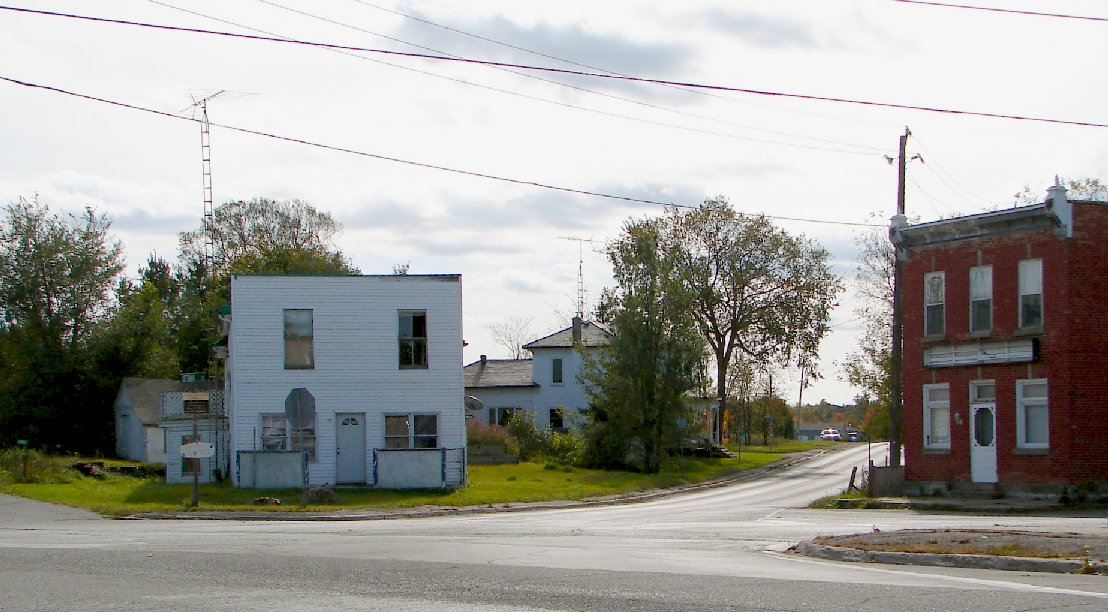
Harrowsmith

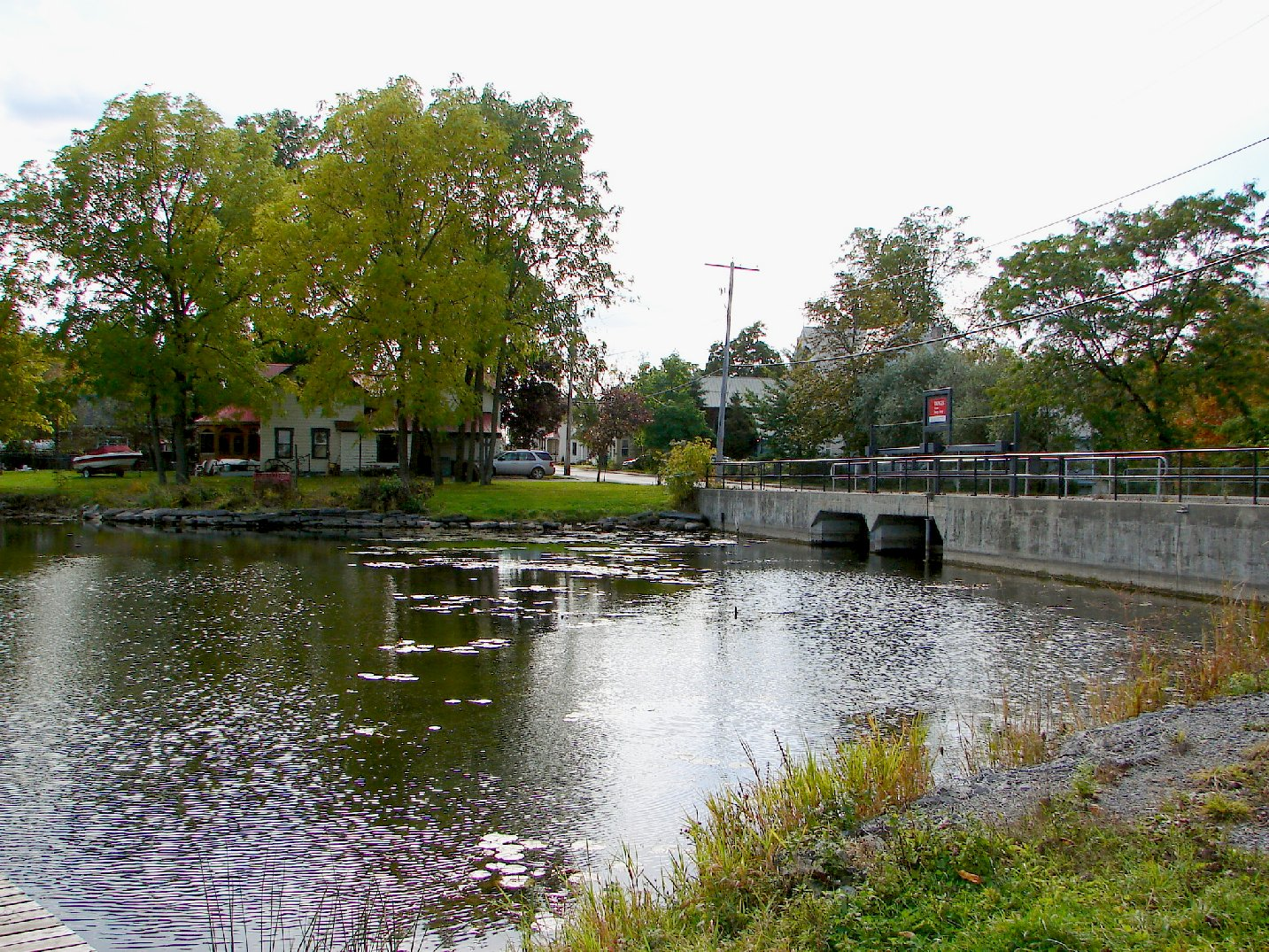
Sydenham

- Battersea
- Bedford
- Bedford Mills
- Bellrock
- Bobs Lake
- Bradshaw
- Brewer Lake
- Buck Lake
- Burnt Hills
- Burridge
- Cedar Lake
- Cranstons Beach
- Davidsons Beach
- Desert Lake
- Fermoy 44°38′26″N 76°31′10″W
- Forest
- Glendower
- Harrowsmith
- Hartington
- Holleford 44.448°N 76.624°W
- Ida Hill 44.375°N 76.396°W
- Inverary
- Keelerville 44.471°N 76.348°W
- Lake Opinicon 44.536°N 76.366°W
- Latimer
- Lower Holleford
- Maple Hill 44.400°N 76.339°W
- Milburn
- Missouri
- Moons Corners
- Murvale
- Murvale Station
- Perth Road
- Petworth
- Railton 44.382°N 76.571°W
- Raymonds Corners 44.480°N 76.484°W
- Rosedale
- Salem
- Spaffordton
- Star Corners
- Storrington
- Sunbury
- Sydenham
- Verona 44°29′N 76°41′W
- Wilmer

== Demographics ==
In the 2021 Census of Population conducted by Statistics Canada, South Frontenac had a population of 20,188 living in 7,937 of its 9,503 total private dwellings, a change of 8.3% from its 2016 population of 18,646. With a land area of 948.05 km^{2} (366.04 sq mi), it had a population density of 21.3/km^{2} (55.2/sq mi) in 2021.

Canada census – South Frontenac community profile

	2021	2016	2011
Population	20,188 (+8.3% from 2016)	18,646 (+2.9% from 2011)	18,113 (-0.6% from 2006)
Land area	984.05 km^{2} (379.94 sq mi)	971.56 km^{2} (375.12 sq mi)	971.68 km^{2} (375.17 sq mi)
Population density	21.3/km^{2} (55/sq mi)	19.2/km^{2} (50/sq mi)	18.6/km^{2} (48/sq mi)
Median age	48.8 (M: 48.4, F: 49.2)	46.9 (M: 46.9, F: 46.9)	44.7 (M: 44.6, F: 44.8)
Private dwellings	9,503 (total)	9,213 (total)	8,836 (total)
Median household income	$104,000	$89,457	$81,664

References: 2021 2016 2011

Mother tongue (2021):

- English as first language: 94.3%
- French as first language: 2.0%
- Other as first language: 2.8%

Historical census populations – South Frontenac
Year	Pop.	±%
1996	15,711	—
2001	16,415	+4.5%
2006	18,227	+11.0%
2011	18,113	−0.6%
2016	18,646	+2.9%
2021	20,188	+8.3%
Source: Statistics Canada

== Education ==
South Frontenac, along with Central Frontenac, North Frontenac and the Frontenac Islands, send students to schools part of the Limestone District School Board, based in neighbouring Kingston.

== Notable people ==
- John Babcock, the last Canadian World War I veteran, was born in South Frontenac.
- Mike Smith, professional goalie in the National Hockey League.
- Abigail Becker, fur trapper known for saving the lives of several people.

== See also ==
- List of townships in Ontario
