= Frontenac County =

- County (upper-tier)
- County of Frontenac
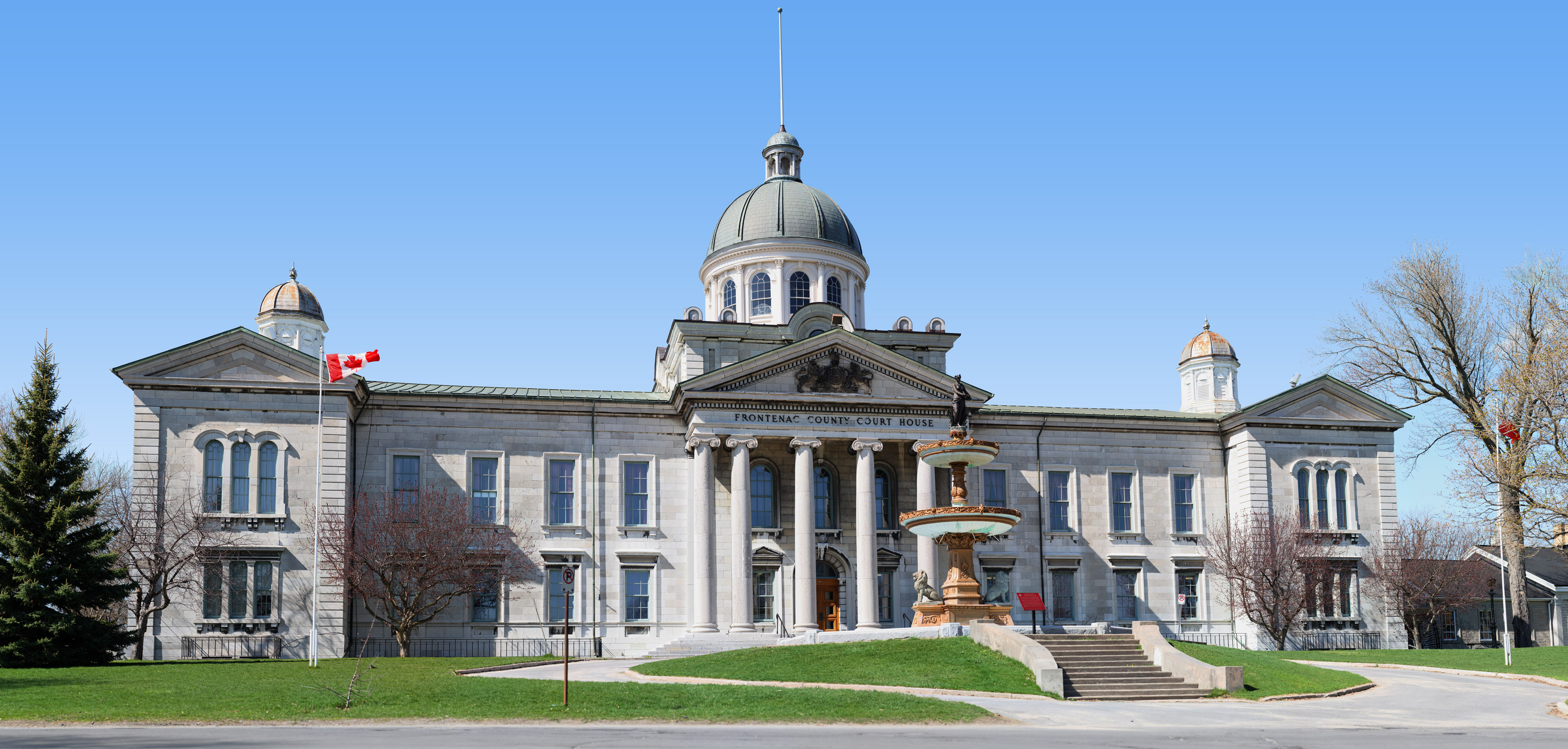
- Frontenac County Courthouse

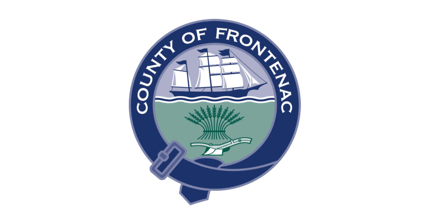
- Flag Logo

- Location of Frontenac County
- Coordinates: 44°40′N 76°42′W
- Country: Canada
- Province: Ontario
- Region: Eastern Ontario
- County seat: Glenburnie
- Municipalities: List: Township of Central Frontenac; Township of Frontenac Islands; Township of North Frontenac; Township of South Frontenac

Government
  - Type: County
  - Warden: Bill Saunders
  - Deputy Warden: Ron Vandewal

Area
  - Land: 3,274.24 km^{2} (1,264.19 sq mi)
  - Census division: 3,725.82 km^{2} (1,438.55 sq mi)
- Land area excludes Kingston

Population (2021)
  - Total: 29,295
  - Density: 8.9/km^{2} (23/sq mi)
  - Census division: 161,780
  - Census division density: 43.4/km^{2} (112/sq mi)
- Total excludes Kingston
- Time zone: UTC-5 (EST)
  - Summer (DST): UTC-4 (EDT)
- Area codes: 613, 343
- Website: www.frontenaccounty.ca

Frontenac County is a county and census division of the Canadian province of Ontario. It is located in the eastern portion of Southern Ontario. The city of Kingston is in the Frontenac census division, but is separated from the County of Frontenac.

== History ==
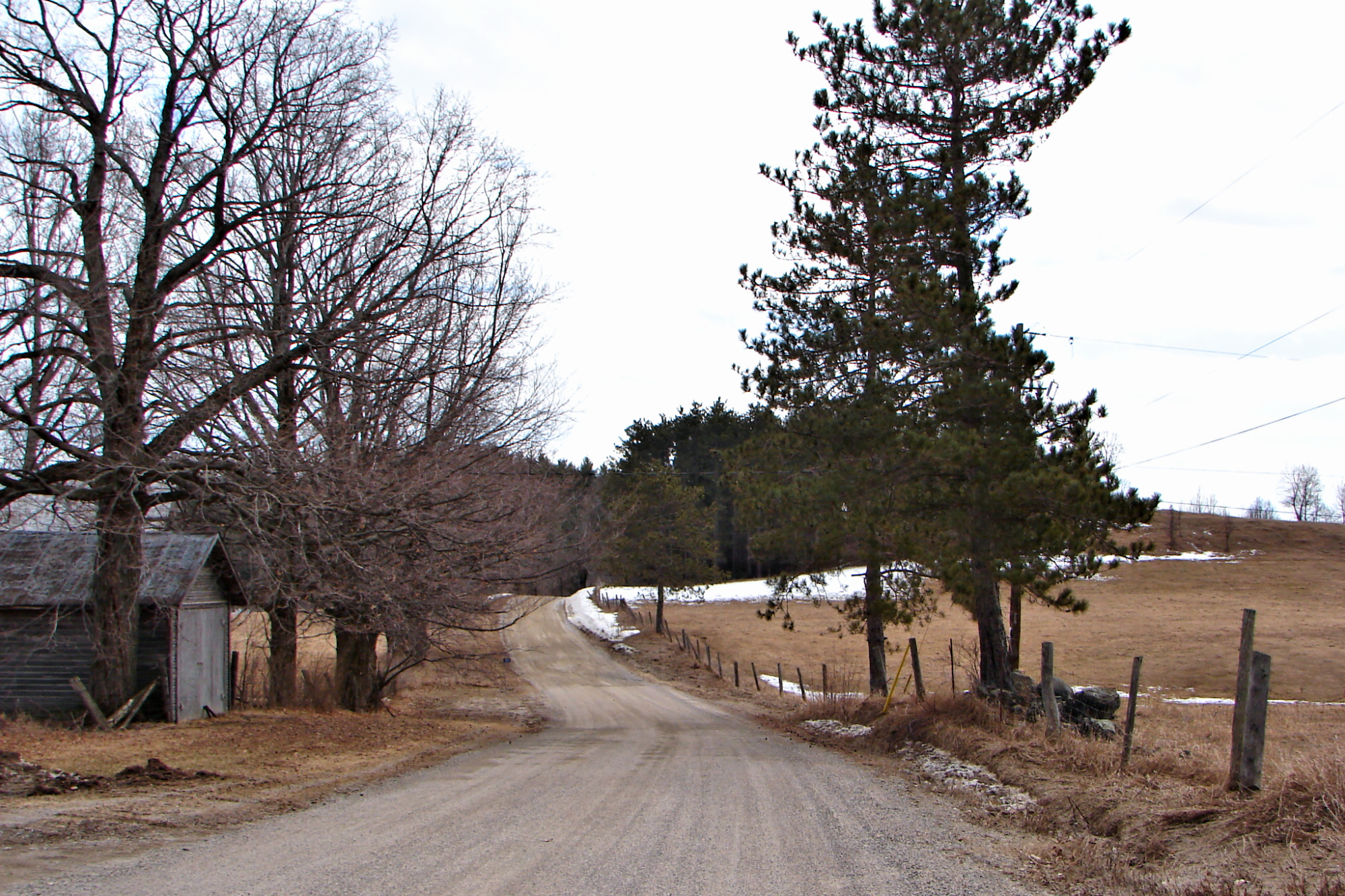
Frontenac Colonization Road

The county of Frontenac, situated within the Mecklenburg District, was originally created as an electoral district for the Legislative Assembly of Upper Canada in 1792 and its original limits were described as being:

bounded on the east by the westernmost line of the county of Leeds, on the south by Lake Ontario, to on the west by the easternmost boundary of the late township of Ernestown, and on the west by the easternmost boundary of the township of Fredericksburgh, running north twenty-four degrees west until it meets the Ottawa or Grand River, thence descending the said river until it meets the northwesternmost boundary of the said county of Leeds.

Mecklenburg was renamed the Midland District in 1792.

At the beginning of 1800, the county was reorganized as follows:

- the eastern part of the islands of the county of Ontario were transferred to Frontenac, on the former's dissolution
- Frontenac was declared to consist solely of the townships of Pittsburg, Kingston, Loughborough, Portland, Hinchbrooke, Bedford and Wolfe Island
- the remaining unorganized territory remained part of Midland District

Through the addition of newly surveyed townships, by 1845 the county covered the following territory:

the Townships of Bedford, Barrie, Clarendon, Hinchinbrooke, Kingston, Kennebec, Loughborough, Olden, Oso, Portland, Pittsburgh, which shall include Howe Island, Palmerston, Storrington, and Wolfe Island, and, except for the purposes of representation in the Legislative Assembly, the Town of Kingston.

In 1860, the newly surveyed townships of Miller and Canonto were transferred from Renfrew County.

In 1998, the county was reorganized, and it now consists of the townships of North Frontenac, Central Frontenac, South Frontenac and Frontenac Islands. The City of Kingston absorbed Kingston and Pittsburgh Townships and exists now as a separated municipality.

The county council itself was abolished and replaced by a management unit with limited powers, known as the Frontenac Management Board. The management unit became a county again in 2004.

== Demographics ==
As a census division in the 2021 Census of Population conducted by Statistics Canada, Frontenac County had a population of 161,780 living in 69,984 of its 80,226 total private dwellings, a change of 7.5% from its 2016 population of 150,480. With a land area of 3,725.82 km^{2} (1,438.55 sq mi), it had a population density of 43.4/km^{2} (112.5/sq mi) in 2021.

Canada census – Frontenac census division community profile

	2021	2016	2011
Population	161,780 (+7.5% from 2016)	150,475 (+0.5% from 2011)	149,738 (+4.1% from 2006)
Land area	3,725.82 km^{2} (1,438.55 sq mi)	3,787.76 km^{2} (1,462.46 sq mi)	3,787.79 km^{2} (1,462.47 sq mi)
Population density	43.4/km^{2} (112/sq mi)	39.7/km^{2} (103/sq mi)	39.5/km^{2} (102/sq mi)
Median age	43.2 (M: 41.6, F: 45.2)	43.6 (M: 41.9, F: 45.2)
Private dwellings	80,226 (total) 69,984 (occupied)	77,155 (total) 64,295 (occupied)	74,074 (total)
Median household income	$81,000	$69,432

Notes: Includes data for City of Kingston
References: 2021 2016 2011

Historical census populations – Frontenac County

Year	Pop.	±%
1921	44,494	—
1931	45,756	+2.8%
1941	53,717	+17.4%
1951	66,099	+23.1%
1956	76,534	+15.8%
1961	87,534	+14.4%

Year	Pop.	±%
1966	97,138	+11.0%
1971	101,692	+4.7%
1976	108,052	+6.3%
1981	108,133	+0.1%
1986	115,221	+6.6%
1991	129,089	+12.0%

Year	Pop.	±%
1996	136,365	+5.6%
2001	138,606	+1.6%
2006	143,865	+3.8%
2011	149,753	+4.1%
2016	150,475	+0.5%
2021	161,780	+7.5%

Includes City of Kingston. Population counts are not adjusted for boundary changes.
Source: Statistics Canada

== Education ==
Children attend schools part of the Limestone District School Board, based in the City of Kingston.

== See also ==
- List of municipalities in Ontario
- List of Ontario Census Divisions
- Kingston Frontenac Public Library
- K&P Rail Trail
- List of townships in Ontario
