= Trans Canada Trail =

Network of multiuse trails across Canada

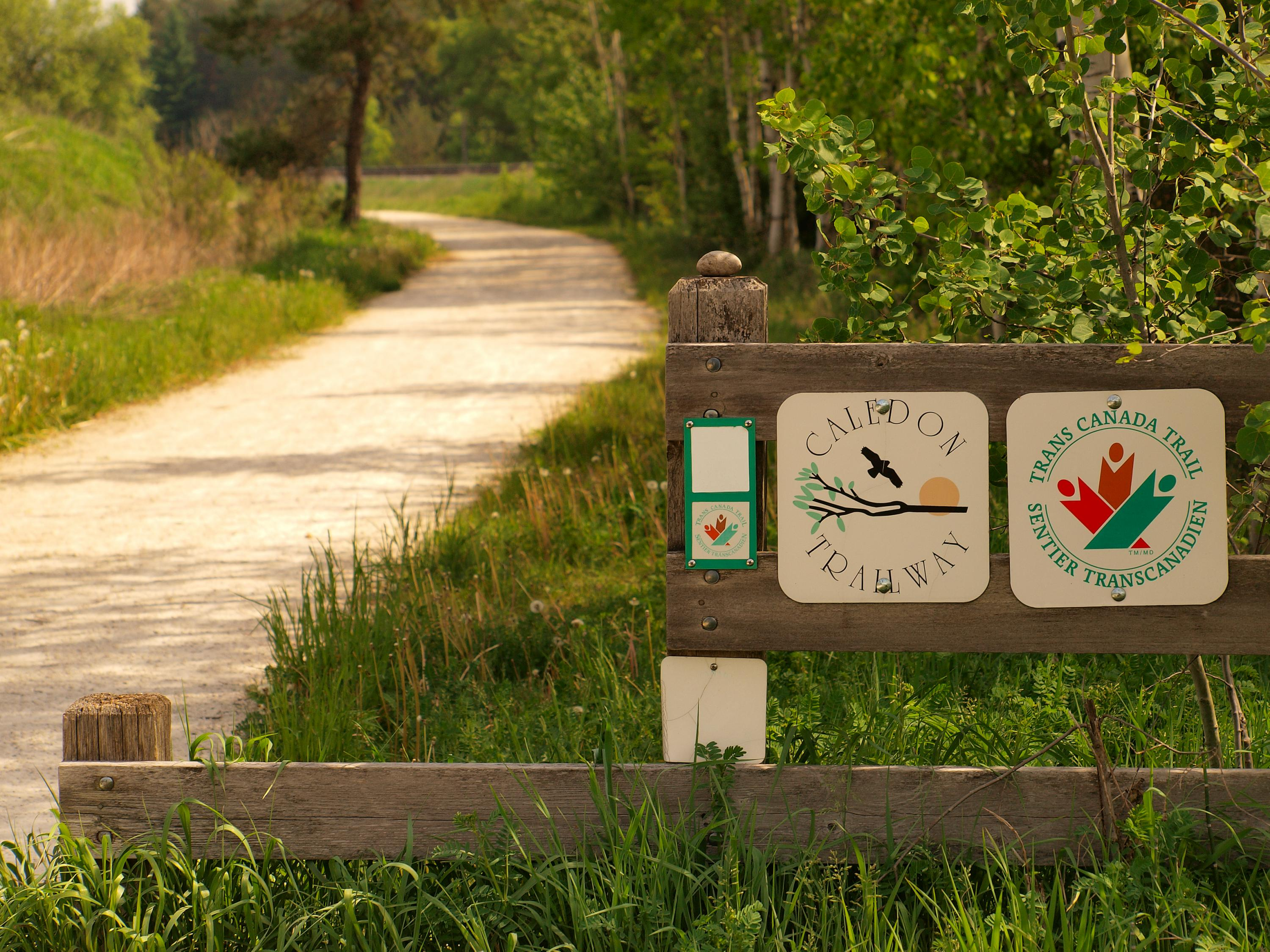
- Length: (As of 2024) 28,000 km (17,000 mi)
- Location: Canada
- Established: 1992; 34 years ago
- Trailheads: Mile zero, Cape Spear, Newfoundland and Labrador; Victoria, British Columbia; Tuktoyaktuk, Northwest Territories
- Use: Hiking; biking; equestrianism; cross-country skiing; snowshoeing; canoeing
- Highest point: 2,185 m (7,169 ft)
- Lowest point: Sea level
- Grade: Variable
- Difficulty: Variable
- Season: All seasons
- Months: All seasons
- Sights: Numerous
- Hazards: Multiple
- Surface: Variable
- Right of way: Multiple
- Website: tctrail.ca

The Trans Canada Trail is a system of greenways, waterways, and roadways that stretches across the entire width of Canada from the Atlantic to the Pacific to the Arctic oceans. The trail extends over 28,000 km (17,000 mi); it is the longest recreational, multi-use trail network in the world. The idea for the trail began in 1992, shortly after the Canada 125 celebrations. Since then it has been supported by donations from individuals, corporations, foundations, and all levels of government.

A nonprofit group called Trans Canada Trail (TCT) raises funds for continued development of the trail. However, the trail is owned and operated at the local level. On August 26, 2017, TCT celebrated the connection of the trail with numerous events held throughout Canada. TCT has said it plans to make the trail more accessible, replace interim roadways with off-road greenways, add new spurs and loops to the trail, and fund emergency repairs when needed. Large sections of the trail, however, are simply highways, such as the Alaska and Dempster highways.

Between September 2016 and June 2021, it was known as the Great Trail, after which the name was changed back to Trans Canada Trail.

== Origin of idea ==
The creation of the trail was born of Canada's 125th anniversary celebrations in 1992. It has its counterparts in such other greenway routes as the 12 EuroVelo routes, the UK's National Cycle Network, and the United States Numbered Bicycle Routes network.

== Funding ==
The Trans Canada Trail has been funded largely by Canadian federal and provincial governments, with significant contributions from corporate and individual donors. The first province to have completed its designated section of the trail was Prince Edward Island (see Confederation Trail).

== Development and maintenance ==
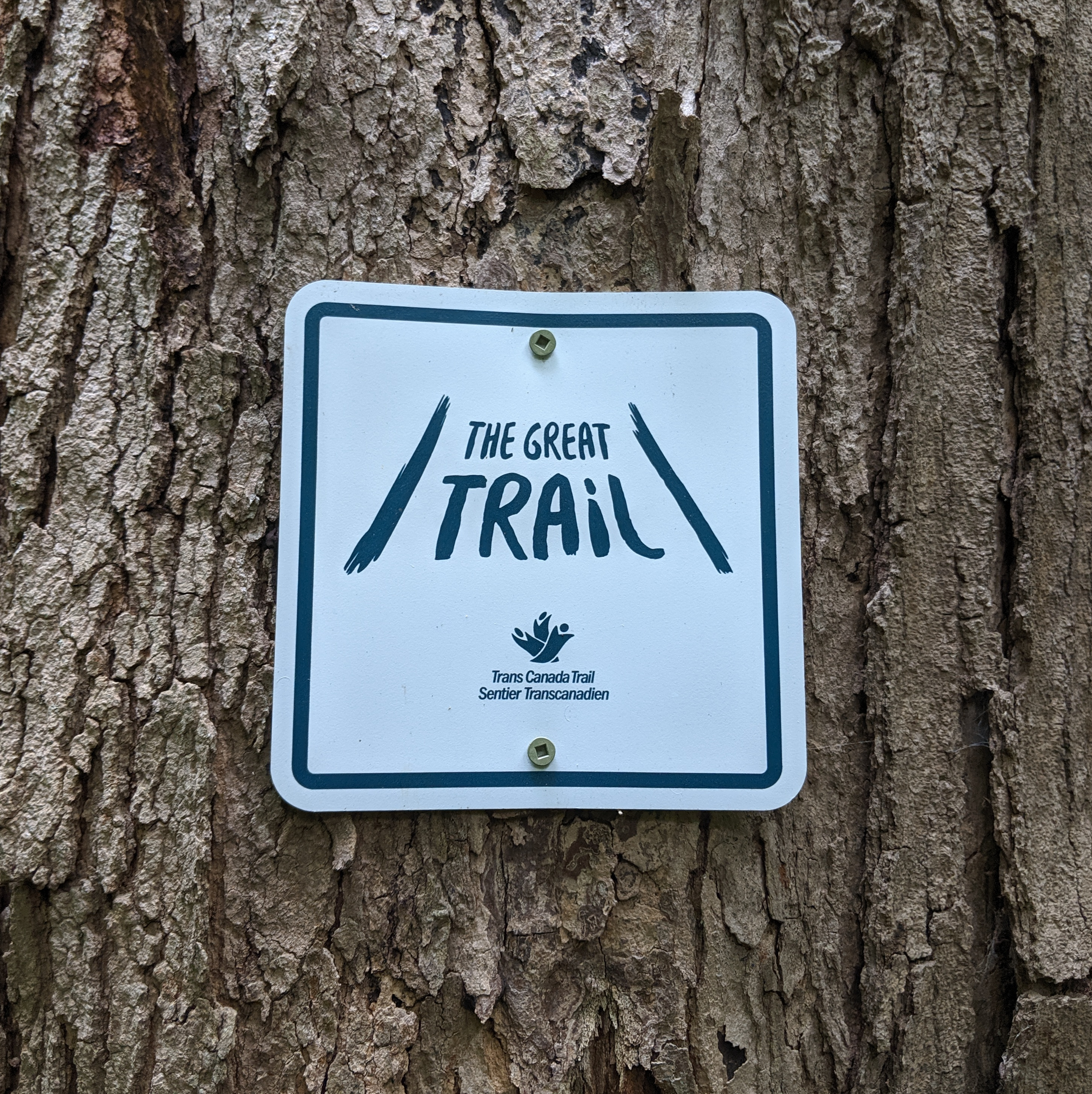
Trail marker

The network of the Trans Canada Trail is made up of more than 400 community trails. Each trail section is developed, owned, and managed locally by trail groups, conservation authorities, and by municipal, provincial, territorial, and federal governments, for instance in parks such as Gatineau Park or along existing trails such as the Cataraqui Trail and Voyageur Hiking Trail. The Trans Canada Trail supports the construction and use of greenways to replace roadways.

Moreover, considerable parts of the trail are repurposed defunct rail lines donated to provincial governments by Canadian Pacific and Canadian National Railway railbeds rebuilt as walking trails. As such, much of the Trans Canada Trail development emulated the successful Rails-to-Trails initiative in the United States, whereby these transportation corridors are "rail banked" as recreational trails, allowing conversion back to rail should future need arise.

Thousands of Canadians, community partner organizations, corporations, local businesses, and all levels of government are involved in developing and maintaining these trails. TCT does not own or operate any section of the trail. As an ensemble, the Trans Canada Trail might be one of the largest volunteer projects ever undertaken in Canada.

== Routes and amenities ==
The main section runs along the southern areas of Canada, connecting most of Canada's major cities and most populous areas. There is also a long northern arm that runs through Alberta to Edmonton and then up through northern British Columbia to the Yukon.

While the route described above has the TCT going east–west through the southern prairie provinces (via Medicine Hat and Calgary), with a northern branch going off to Edmonton and on to the north, the Trans Canada Trail officially is shown as going from Winnipeg across the northern Prairies, coming into Alberta east of Edmonton, spawning a northern walking trail near Fort Saskatchewan before entering Edmonton, then going south to Calgary and west to BC.

The trail is multi-use and depending on the section may allow hikers, bicyclists, horseback riders, cross country skiers, and snowmobilers. In theory, the trail is equipped with regularly spaced pavilions that provide shelter as well as fresh water to travellers, but this varies widely from section to section, and particularly from province to province.

"Mile zero" of the trail is located outside the Railway Coastal Museum in St. John's, Newfoundland.

== Future developments ==
While the trail is connected, TCT stated that it will continue to fundraise for its future development and enhancement. Among its objectives, TCT says that it plans to replace interim roadways with off-road greenways, where possible, to make it safer and more accessible for all users; to add new trail sections, and to provide emergency funding for trail sections damaged by natural disasters, etc.

The trail is not owned or operated by TCT, but the organization provides support to local partners and volunteer groups who maintain individual sections.

On September 4, 2018, TCT announced that the government of Canada would invest $30 million in trail development in the next four years. The official announcement was made by Catherine McKenna, Minister of Environment and Climate Change.

== Criticism ==
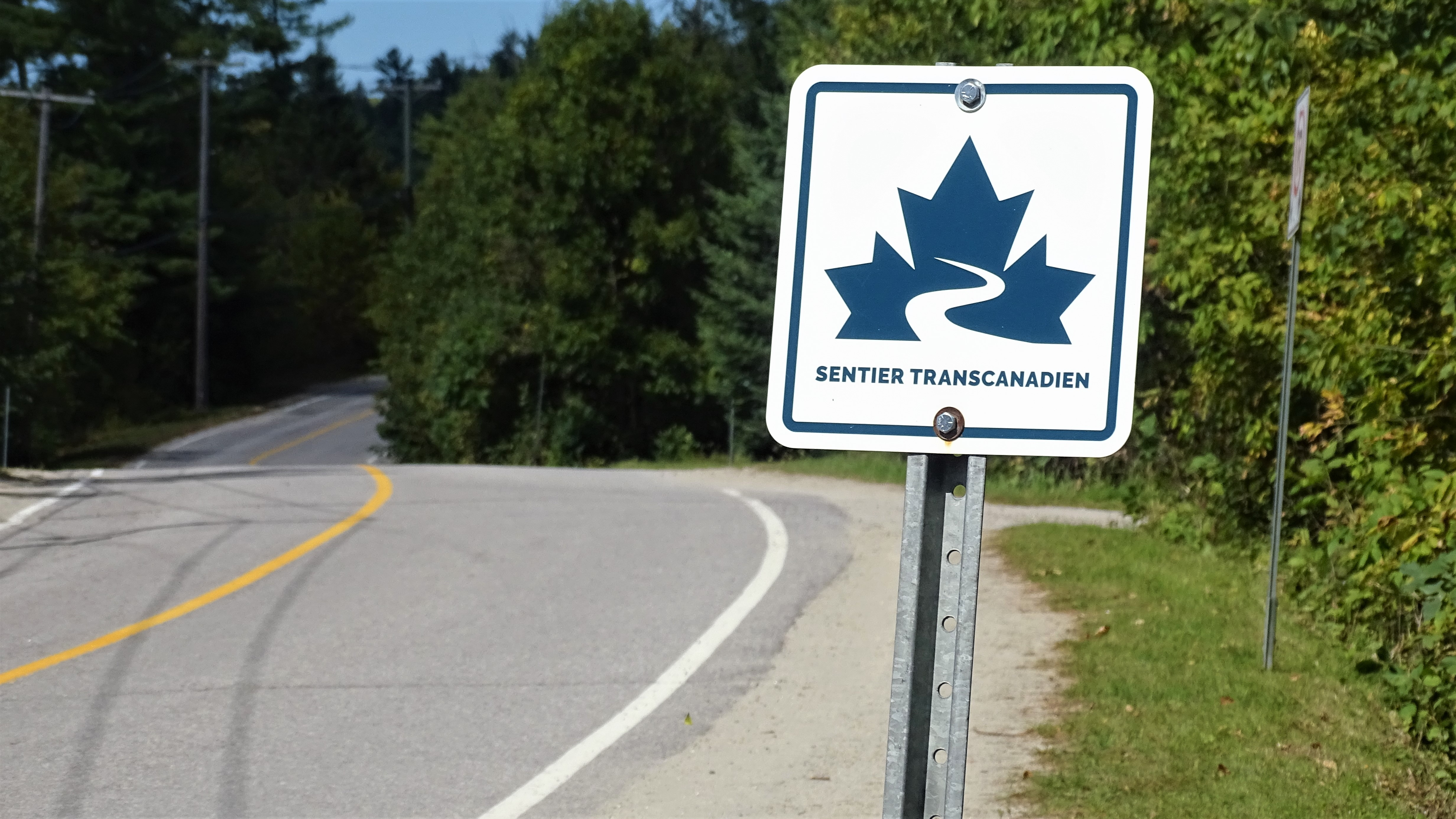
Section of the Trans Canada Trail that is confluent with a road and has no dedicated pedestrian path, near Wakefield, Quebec.

Edmund A. Aunger, professor emeritus of political science at the University of Alberta, Campus Saint-Jean, is a vocal critic of the trail, particularly in the way it has strayed from the original vision of "a trail built far enough from roads to mask traffic noise and avoid collisions".

Because only 32 per cent (i.e., 7,898 km [4,908 mi]) of the Trans Canada Trail consists of actual off-road trails, the Trans Canada Trail is fundamentally very different from classic pure-hiking trails like the Appalachian Trail. Furthermore, not all of the off-road trails are hiking-only. Also, because many sections are on-road, cycling is more suitable for those stretches. Additionally, since some sections are on waterways, a cross-country trekker cannot rely on any one mode of transportation alone.

Aunger states that "Lacking both uniform standards and control, the Trans Canada Trail includes a confusing and dangerous hodgepodge of mountain-bike paths, roadside ditches, dirt ruts, gravel roads and hazardous ATV trails."

In 2012, Aunger's wife, Elizabeth Ann Sovis, was killed while cycling on a portion of the trail in Prince Edward Island.

== Infrastructure and route details ==
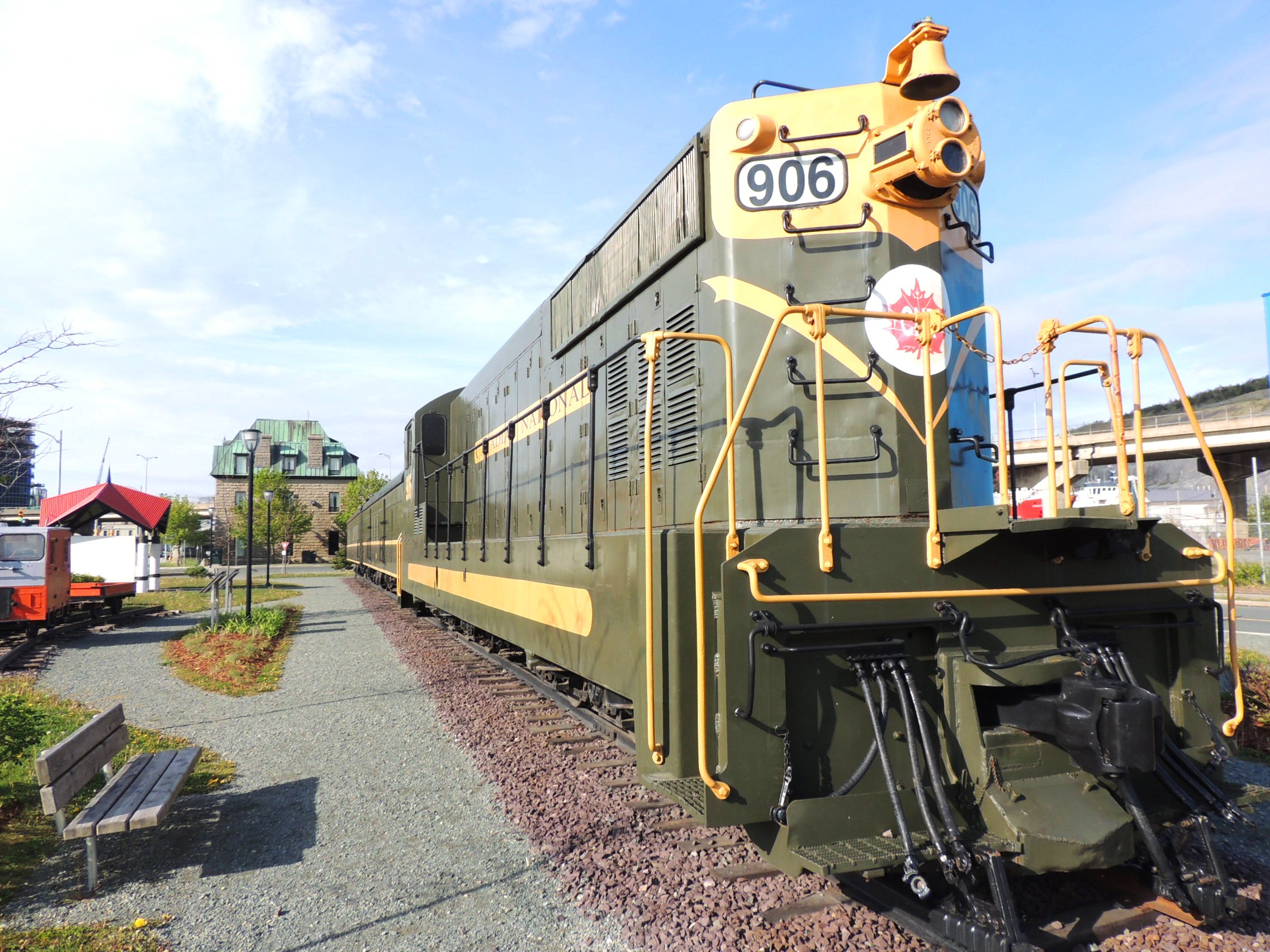
The former eastern terminus of the Newfoundland T'Railway at the Railway Coastal Museum in St. John's, NL

=== Newfoundland and Labrador ===
As of May 2017, "Kilometre 0" begins at Cape Spear, the most easterly point in continental North America. Here it is known as the East Coast Trail, a series of rugged coastal wilderness paths. The route follows the coastline north around St. John's Bay and Freshwater Bay, connecting with the Grand Concourse walkway network at Fort Amherst. The route then follows a sidewalkway along Southside Road adjacent to St. John's Harbour until the former Trail Eastern Terminus located at the Railway Coastal Museum. From here it follows the former Newfoundland Railway route travelling south, crossing Route 2 into Kilbride then through Bowring Park. It continues northwest through Mount Pearl then Donovans crossing Route 1 into Paradise, passing Neils Pond and Octagon Pond. The route then turns southwest in Conception Bay South and crosses Route 60 before it meets and follows the Conception Bay coastline. At Indian Pond, the Grand Concourse trail ends, and the route is known as the Newfoundland T'Railway, an 883 km linear park that consists of the former railbed and permits motorized access.

The route continues as the Newfoundland T'Railway southwest, passing through the east side of Holyrood Bay. The trail passes through Briens as it enters Hollyrood. The route again crosses Route 60, then the North Arm River, then travels north through Burnt Stump. The route travels southwest passing Woodsford, then passes through Brien's Gullies before then crossing Route 1 again. It then passes through Brigus Junction, Mahers, then Ocean Pond, then a mostly treed area before entering Whitbourne and crossing Route 80. Continuing, the route crosses Route 100, then enters Placentia Junction before turning north, passing over Coles Pond. Crossing Route 120, the next major location is Tickle Harbour Station, where it again touches Route 1 and follows it, crossing a few more times before entering Cobb's Pond, then Come By Chance. The route continues as it enters Goobies, then Northern Blight, then crosses Route 1 as it enters Clarenville. It follows Shoal Harbour River as it enters Thorburn Lake, then crosses Route 233 at Port Blandford, then crosses Route 1 again as it enters Terra Nova.

The trail changes to Gambo to Terra Nova Trail as it continues to Alexander Bay, then route 1, then Route 320 as it enters Gambo.

Continuing north, the next leg of the trail is called Cobb Corridor Trail as it enters Butts, then Benton, then it turns northwest as it enters Gander. As it continues, the route passes Glenwood, then continues to Notre Dame Junction, passing Route 340 and finally Norris Arm.

The next section is Newfoundland Trailway Park, continuing to Rattling Brook, as it follows the Exploits River through Junipers Brook, Bishops Falls, crossing Route 350 and continuing through Grand Falls.

Now known as Exploits Valley and Beothuk Trail, the trail moves along into Windsor, then Badger. From here it is known as Newfoundland Trailway Park and travels through West Lake and Millertown Junction. The route then passes through Quarry, Gaff Topsails, Kittys Brook, and Howley, where it crosses the Main Brook and ends in Deer Lake.

The next stretch is called the Deer Lake to Corner Brook Trail and closely follows Route 1 through Pasadena, Steady Brook, and Corner Brook on the south side of the Upper Humber River, ending as it crosses Route 450.

Continuing south, the route is now known as Newfoundland Trailway Park, passing through Mount Moriah, then continuing on Harrys River into Gallants, then crossing Route 460 as it intersects with Route 461 at Stephenville Crossing in St. George's Bay. Passing through St. George's, the route crosses Fischells Brook, then crosses Route 404 in Cartyville. Passing through St. Fintans, the route continues to Codroy Pond, then South Branch, Benoits Siding, Doyles, Tompkins, St Andrews, and ends in Cape Ray.

The last stretch of the trail in Newfoundland is known as the Wreckhouse Trail. This section passes through Osmond, Grand Bay, and ends in Port aux Basques, where you would take the Port Aux Basques to North Sydney Ferry to North Sydney, Nova Scotia.

=== Nova Scotia ===
In Nova Scotia, the trail begins where it is known as Pottle Lake to North Sydney, on Cape Breton Island in the town of North Sydney, separating itself from Highway 105 after the ferry ride from Newfoundland. As of June 2014, this portion of the route has not been completed; however, it is planned to travel through the town and cross Highway 125 following Old Branch Road on the North Side of Pottle Lake.

From here, the trail changes to Old Branch Road - George River Division and continues through Georges River and then heads southeast, touching the north east corner of Scotch Lake, then enters the community of Scotch Lake and follows Scotch Lake Road.

The route continues as Upper Leitches Creek to Scotch Lake, briefly merging with Route 223 on the Bras D'or Lakes Scenic Drive, then follows Upper Leitches Creek Road as it enters Upper Leitches Creek.

At this point it changes to the Scotch Lake – Grand Narrows trail as it continues on Tower Road, then passes the MacAulays Lakes. Here it crosses McLeod Brook as it passes through Bodale Hills. The route changes to Little Narrows as it enters the community of Rear Christmas Island. It again merges onto Highway 223 in Christmas Island and follows the highway through Grand Narrows, Iona, Jamesville, Jamesville West, and Ottawa Brook. As the route passes Bras d'Or Lake, it crosses at Little Narrows, using the Little Narrows Ferry and crossing the Trans-Canada Highway at Highway 105 in Aberdeen, then continuing north through Lewis Mountain, where it becomes the Celtic Shores Coast Trail.

==== Celtic Shores Coast Trail ====
The Trans Canada Trail continues, passing Route 395 and going through Scotsville to a fork north of Strathlorne in the Municipality of the County of Inverness.

==== Halifax, Dartmouth, Cole Harbour, and Eastern Shore area ====
The only trail in Halifax is the Halifax Boardwalk. The boardwalk travels from Pier 21 to near Casino Nova Scotia. There are two trails in Dartmouth. The Dartmouth Waterfront Trail starts at Alderney Landing and ends in Woodside. The other trail goes by two names: Dartmouth Multi-use Trail and Shubie Canal Greenway. The trail visits Dartmouth's best parks, including Shubie Park. The Trans Canada Trail continues straight on trail from Shearwater to Meaghers Grant. Shearwater Flyer Trail, Forest Hills Trail System, Salt Marsh Trail, Atlantic View Trail, Blueberry Run Trail, Gaetz Brook Greenway and Musquodoboit Trailway are the names of the rest of the area's trails. Out of the region, the Trans Canada Trail continues on roads.

The North Trail or North Path travels north and ends in Inverness.

The South Trail passes through Strathlorne, then through Loch Ban, and then Black River, where its name changes to Mabou Rivers Trail. From here it passes through Glendyer, then crosses Route 252 as it passes through Rankinville, then crosses Route 19 in Mabou.

=== Prince Edward Island ===
Prince Edward Island's portion of the Trans Canada Trail is known as the Confederation Trail. The main section runs from Tignish at kilometre 0 to Elmira at kilometre 273. Spurs extend to Charlottetown, Georgetown, Montague, Murray River, Murray Harbour, Souris, Wood Islands, and to the Confederation Bridge in Borden-Carleton, which links the Island with New Brunswick on the Canadian mainland.

=== New Brunswick ===
Shogomoc River Pedestrian Bridge is an 81 m (265 ft) suspension bridge in Lakeland Ridges, New Brunswick. Part of the Trans Canada Trail and the Sentier NB Trail network, it was opened in October 2011 by a ribbon-cutting ceremony with journalist Valerie Pringle present as a TCT representative. Sentier NB Trail provided over $300,000 towards the project. It is known as the final non-motorized trail link between the town of Grand Bay–Westfield and the border of the province of Quebec.

=== Quebec ===
Much of the trail's current route through Quebec follows the Route Verte and has many cycling paths. Completed off-road hiking trails can be found in Gatineau Park and along a route linking the Papineau-Labelle Nature Reserve, Mont Tremblant Provincial Park, and the Mastigouche Nature Reserve. These form part of a planned hiking route that would eventually link Ottawa-Gatineau on the Ontario border with the Gaspe Peninsula and the New Brunswick border.

=== Ontario ===
As a legacy project of the 2015 Pan American Games and the 2015 Parapan American Games, the Pan Am Path helps complete the 250 kilometres (160 mi) of gaps in Ontario's portion of the Trans Canada Trail. In 2013, a one-kilometre-long honorary segment of the Trans Canada Trail was opened on the grounds of Rideau Hall in Ottawa. The Lake Huron-North Channel Waterfront route reduces use of shoulders along the Trans-Canada Highway by about 50 kilometres.

=== Prairie provinces ===
The route through Manitoba is a mix of off-road hiking trails, road shoulders, and waterways.

Saskatchewan has managed to avoid major highways and paved roads and uses nothing more than rural gravel roads to link off-road hiking trails. The route through this province has been proclaimed as complete with the opening of the Wakamow Valley Suspension Bridge. However, parts of the land route include some waterways that require a canoe or small boat.

The off-road sections of the trail are very fragmentary in Alberta, where opposition to the trail by special interest groups has been very strong. A major section in Alberta follows highway 2A between Edmonton and Calgary, a road that combines narrow shoulders with heavy traffic. The main role of the Alberta government so far has been to assist local trail associations in searching for better routes. Multi-use trails in the city of Fort Saskatchewan and Sturgeon County are planned to be connected with a new pedestrian bridge spanning the North Saskatchewan River, which was funded as part of a project to completely twin Highway 15 in the region.

East of Edmonton, the TCT from Elk Point to Waskatenau uses the Iron Horse Trail, which lies on the old route of the Oliver–St. Paul rail line once operated by the Canadian Northern Railway (later the Canadian National). The Iron Horse Trail allows use of feet, quads, and horses. At Waskatenau, the trail veers south to the banks of the North Saskatchewan River and winds westward to Fort Saskatchewan.

Just north of Fort Saskatchewan, the TCT forks, with the "Northern walking trail" winding north to Athabasca, across northern Alberta, northern BC, and the Yukon. At Athabasca, the northern walking trail spawns a water trail that takes travellers down the Athabasca River to the Mackenzie and thence to the Arctic Ocean.

=== British Columbia ===
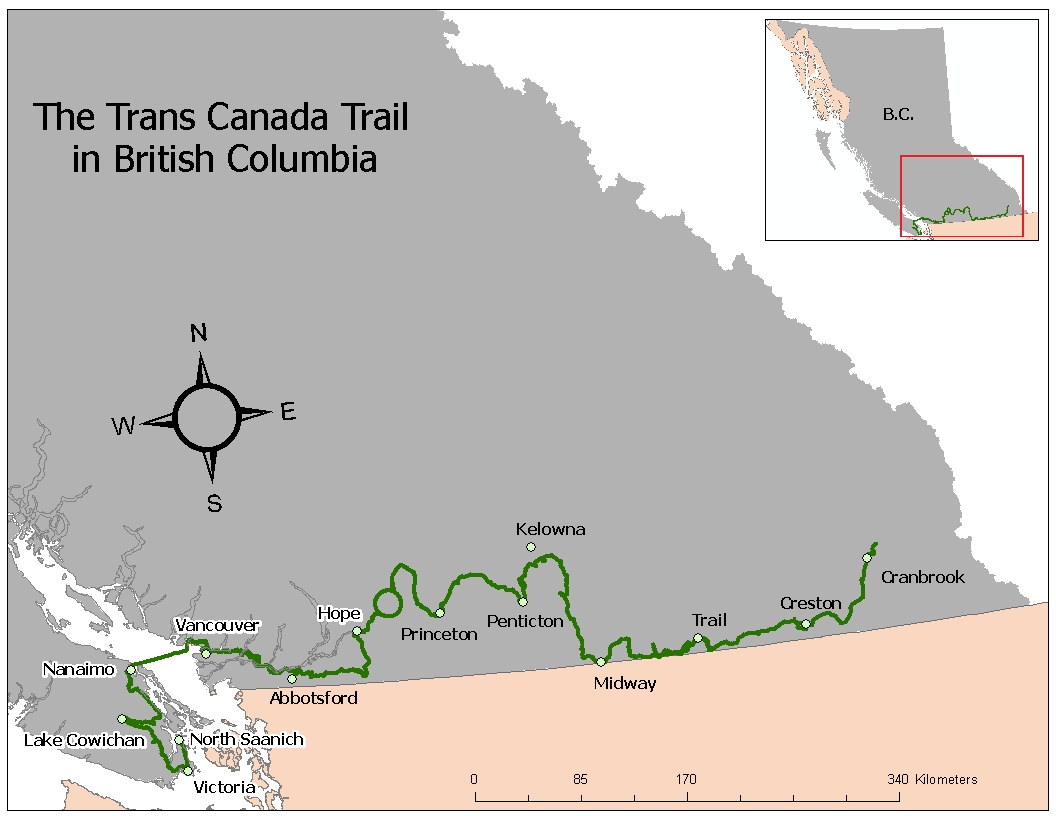
The Southern aspect of parts of the Trans Canada Trail, in British Columbia. Note some errors are present.

The main leg of the trail enters British Columbia from Alberta, following the Elk River passing through Sparwood and the Kootenays and Columbia mountains. From there, it delves southward and westward near the Kettle river. The trail passes through the Okanagan Valley over the Kettle Valley Rail Trail, including the very popular Myra Canyon portion. From here, it heads through Princeton. Between Brookmere and the Othello Tunnels, the trail officially follows the route of the Vancouver, Victoria and Eastern Railway at Princeton and then onto parts of the Kettle Valley Railway south of Brookmere, but due to lost bridges, washouts, grade degradation, and freeway construction, it actually traces the Coquihalla Highway. The route then sideskirts down the Silverhope logging road and over the steep, overgrown, and isolated Paleface Pass into the Chilliwack Lake basin. Once down to the lake level, pavement resumes. It then continues west on a mixture of dikes and rural roads to Vancouver and West Vancouver, to connect to Horseshoe Bay. The Vancouver-to-Nanaimo section involves a trip on BC Ferries. From Nanaimo, the trail extends southward on various roads until meeting the Cowichan Valley Trail on Vancouver Island. From there, it maintains its own right-of-way (sometimes shared with the Esquimalt & Nanaimo Railway) to Victoria, where another ferry returns to Vancouver.

The Salish Sea Marine Trail is an alternate route to Victoria from Horseshoe Bay, crossing the Strait of Georgia from the Sunshine Coast and the northern Gulf Islands to Nanoose Bay, then travelling south to Victoria via the southern Gulf Islands. Another marine route, the Sea to Sky Marine Trail, connects Horseshoe Bay and Gibsons to Squamish via the Howe Sound. From Squamish it joins the Sea to Sky Trail, which is officially designated as a spur of the Trans Canada Trail to Whistler and Pemberton.

=== Northwest Territories ===
The Northwest Territories is where the Trans Canada Trail meets the Arctic Ocean. The land-based trail comes through the Yukon up the Dempster Highway and into the N.W.T., where it continues north through the Mackenzie Delta to Tuktoyaktuk, the most northern point on the Trans Canada Trail. There is also a significant portion of the water-based trail in the N.W.T. that comes from Alberta via the Slave River, across Great Slave Lake and north along the Mackenzie River to the Arctic Ocean.

=== Nunavut ===
There is a small section of the trail on Baffin Island, Nunavut, from the capital city of Iqaluit south along the Itijjagiaq trail to Kimmirut. A short one-kilometre section also exists at the site of the Bloody Falls portage, 16 kilometres south of Kugluktuk.

=== Yukon ===
The Yukon provides the land link between British Columbia and the Arctic. The trail enters the Yukon from British Columbia on the Alaska Highway, south of Watson Lake. Due to the vast distances and sparse population, the Yukon's section of trail mainly follows the highway network between communities, branching off onto smaller multiuse trails near most settlements. Many of these multiuse trails are also historically significant routes, including the Copper Haul Trail near Whitehorse, the Dawson Overland Trail from Takhini to Braeburn, and the Heritage Ridge Road near Dawson City. The route north is then completed by following the Dempster Highway up to the N.W.T. border, where the trail carries on north to the Arctic Ocean.

== Promotion of the trail ==
In February 2018, a "special collector's edition" of the Canadian Geographic Magazine was released, titled "The Great Trail". On the cover, four trails are highlighted for readers: Itijjagiaq Trail in Nunavut, The Lake Superior Water Trail in Ontario, The Edmonton River Valley in Alberta, and Cowichan Valley in British Columbia.

On September 14, 2019, the Trans Canada Trail and the Bateman Foundation teamed up to host the Nature Sketch on The Great Trail event. Seven communities across Canada hosted such events, including: Victoria, British Columbia; Vancouver, British Columbia; Calgary, Alberta; Saskatoon, Saskatchewan; Toronto, Ontario; Halifax, Nova Scotia; Tuktoyaktuk, Northwest Territories. An artist from the Bateman Foundation team led sketching workshops for participants. This event gathered 300 people across Canada.

The 2023 documentary film 500 Days in the Wild portrays the efforts of photographer Dianne Whelan to travel the entire length of the trail.

== Photos ==
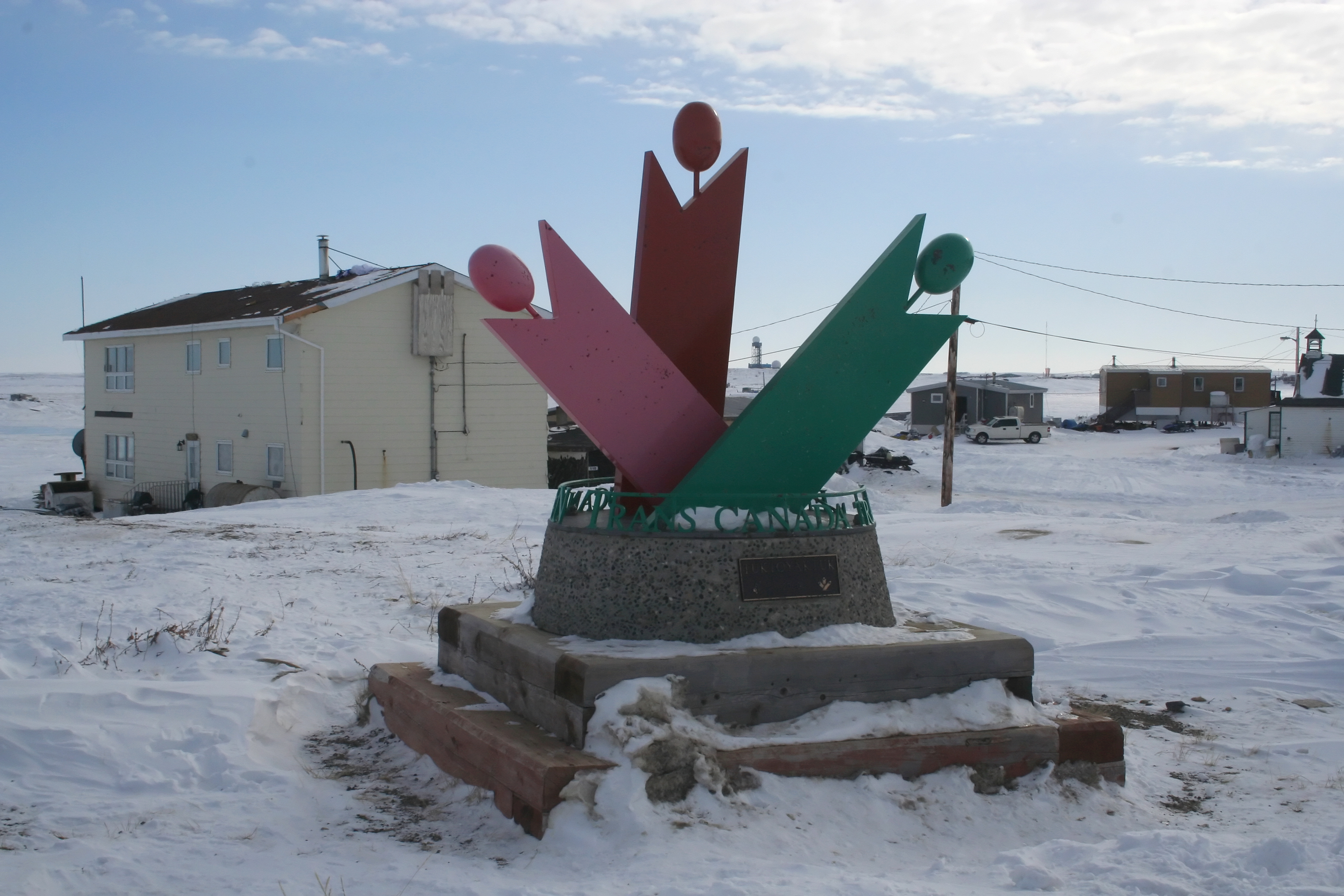
Trans Canada Trail marker in Tuktoyaktuk, Northwest Territories

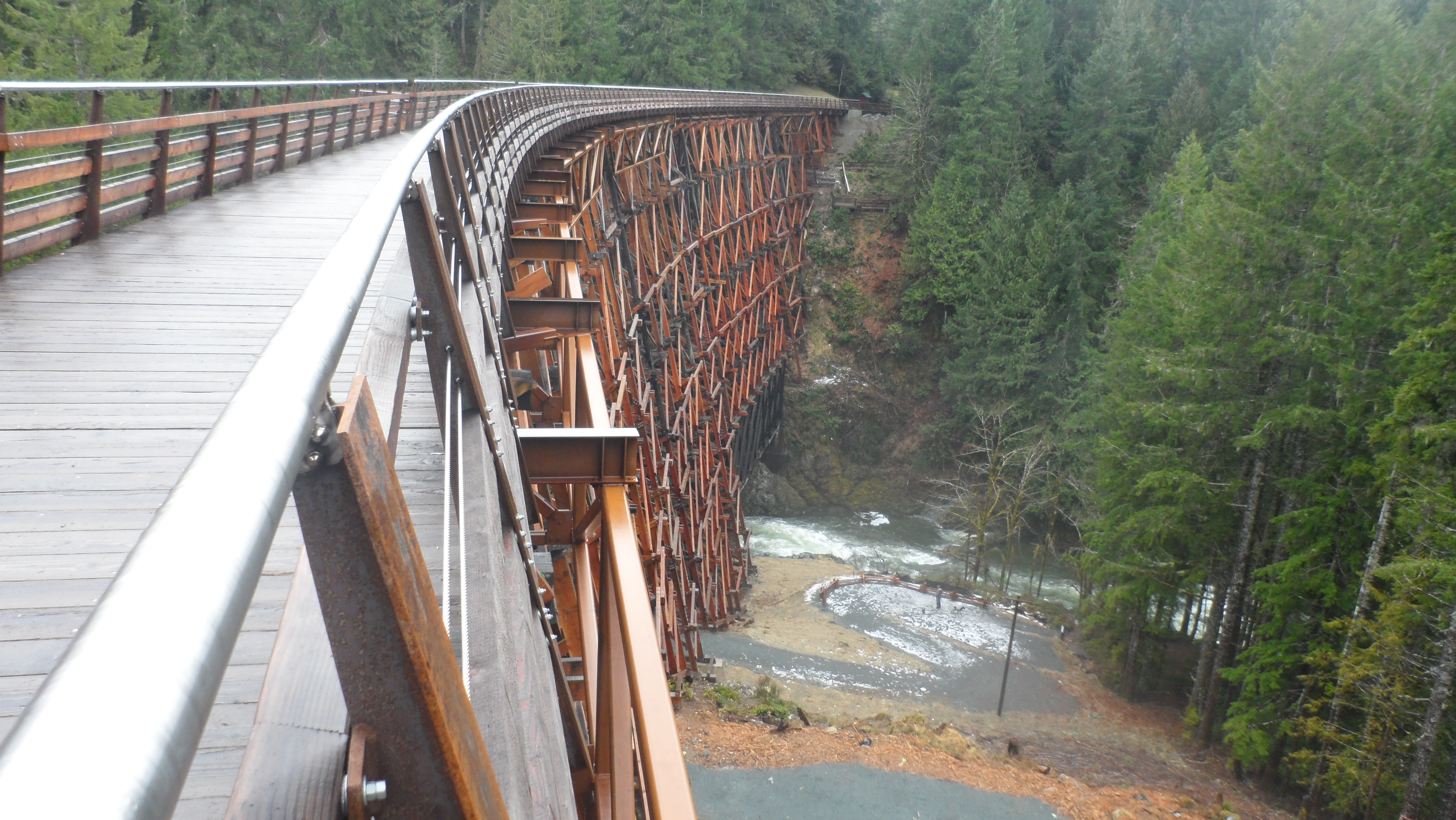
The newly restored Kinsol Trestle, which spans the Koksilah River on Vancouver Island

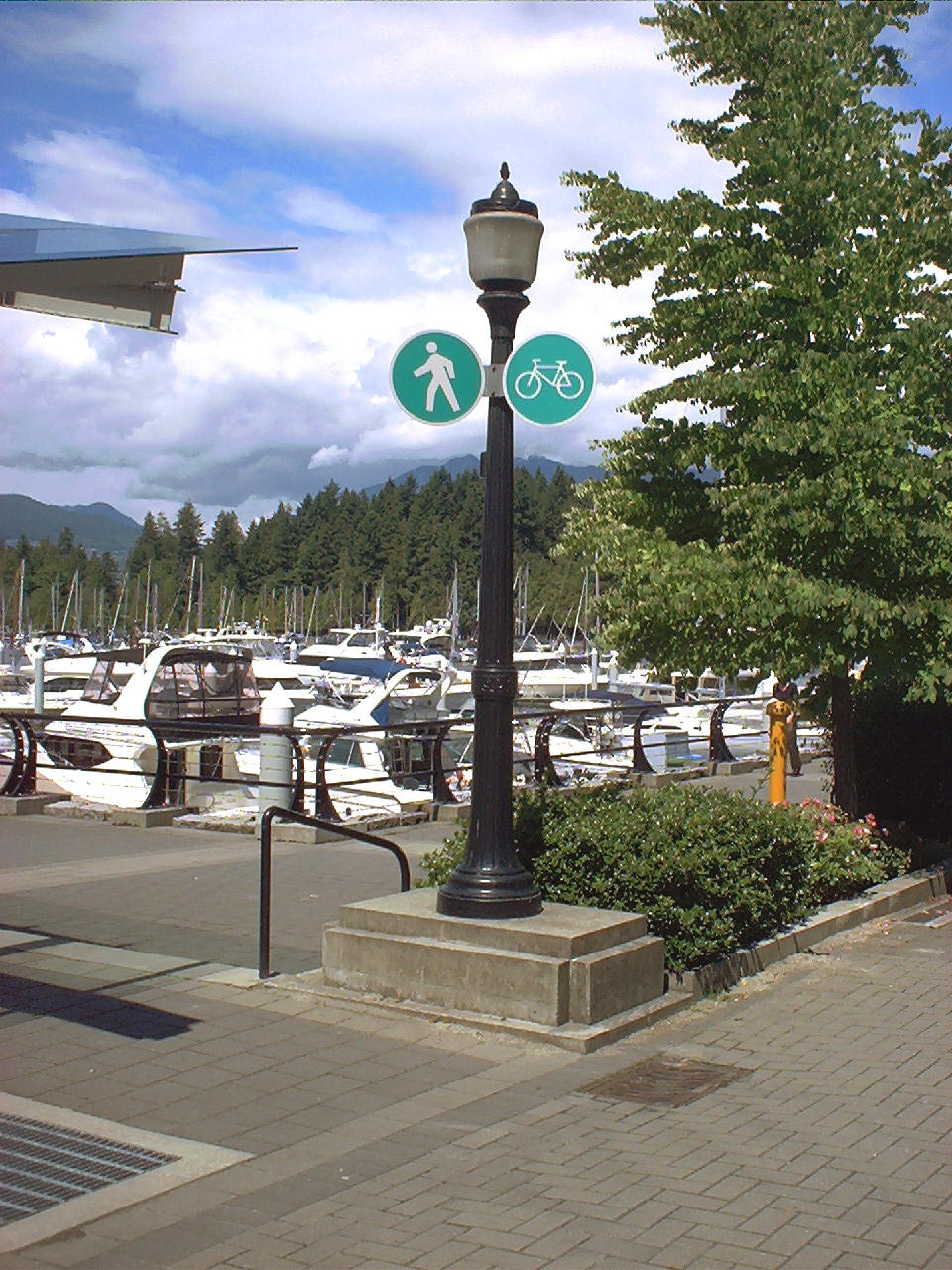
Trans Canada Trail along Coal Harbour in downtown Vancouver, British Columbia

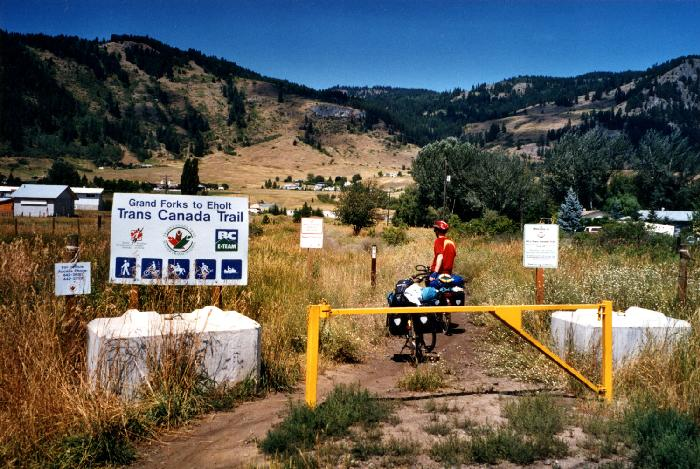
Trans Canada Trail in Grand Forks, British Columbia

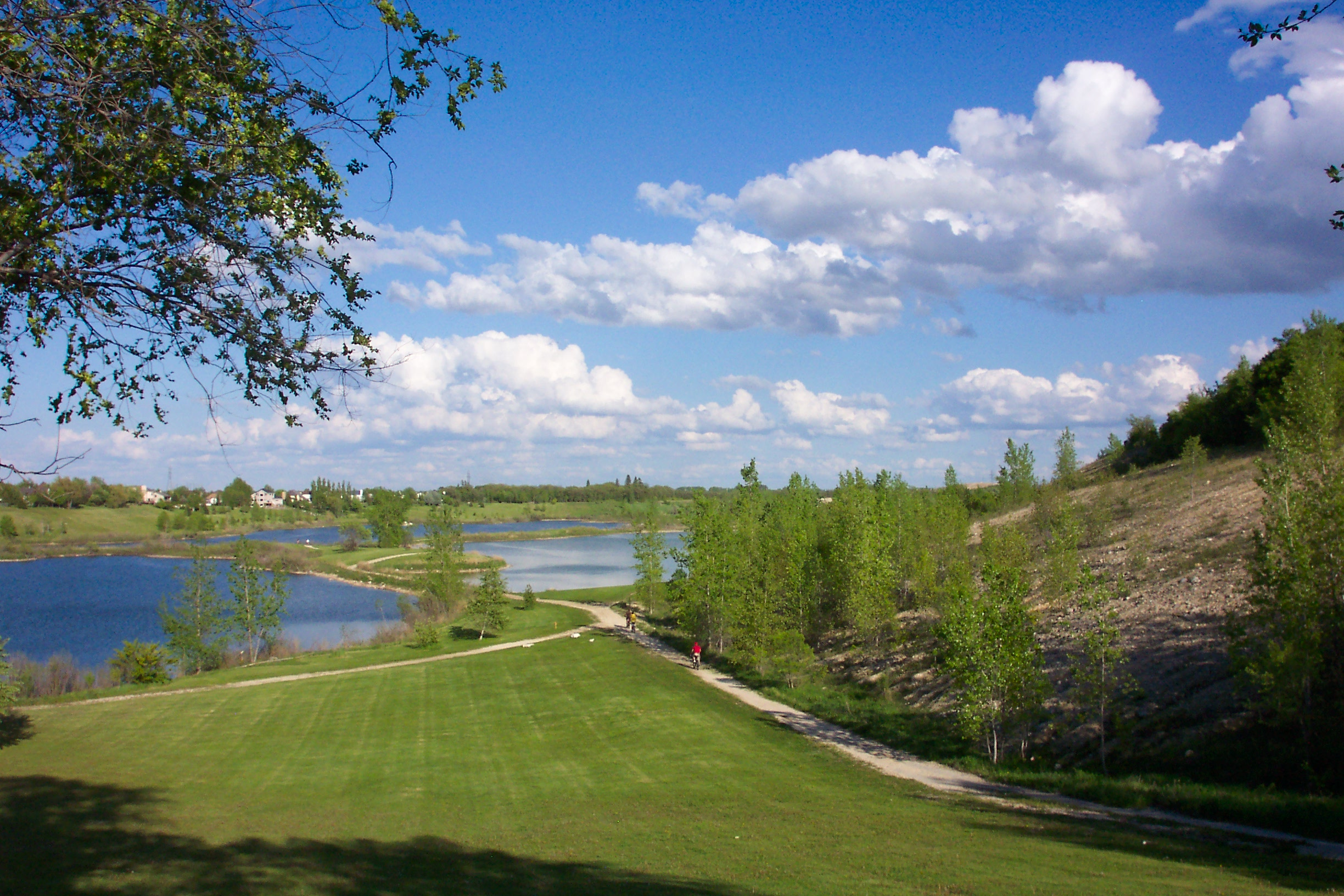
Trans Canada Trail at Silver Springs Park viewed from Birds Hill, R.M. of East St. Paul, Manitoba

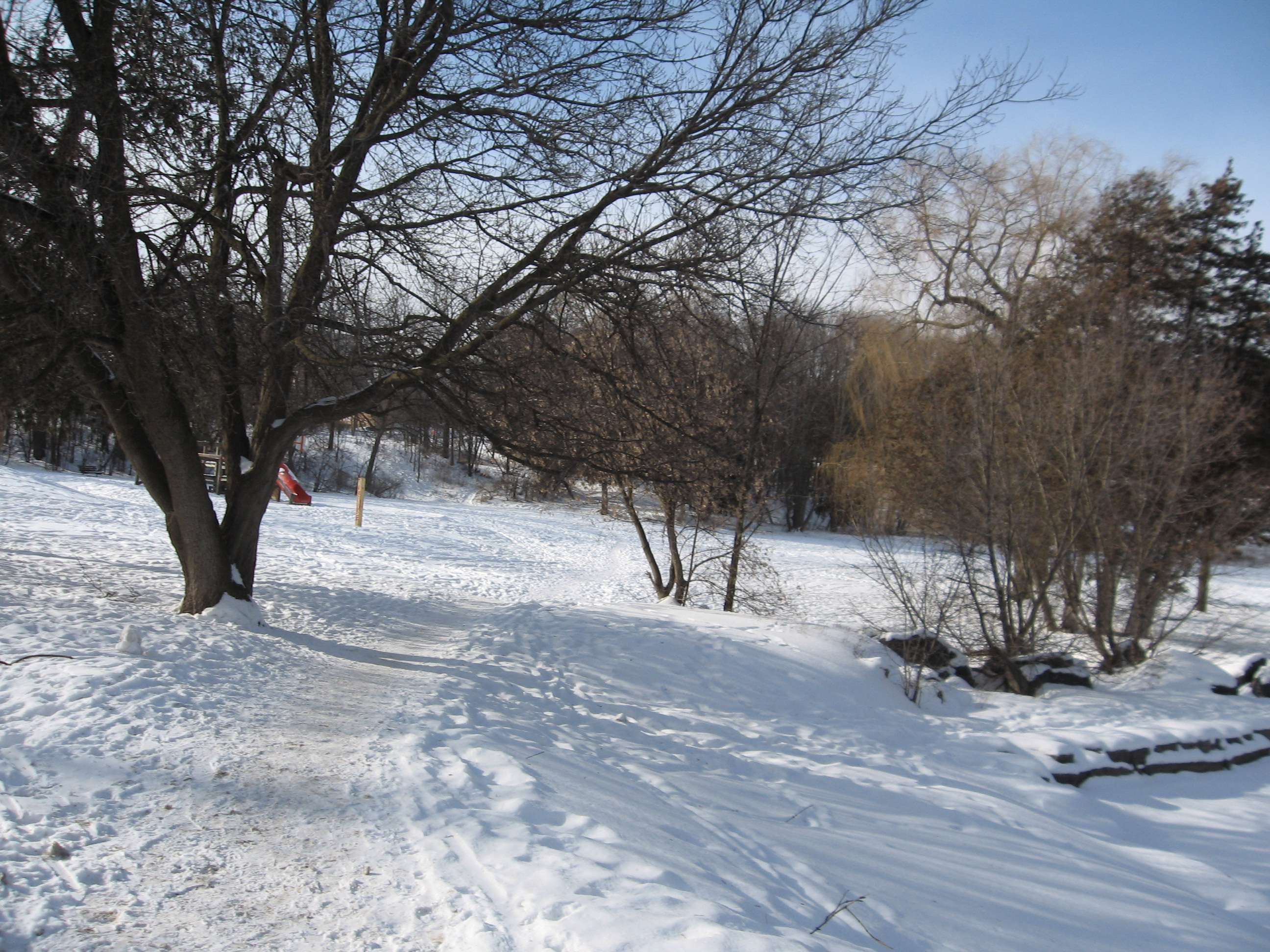
Trans Canada Trail in winter in Peterborough, Ontario

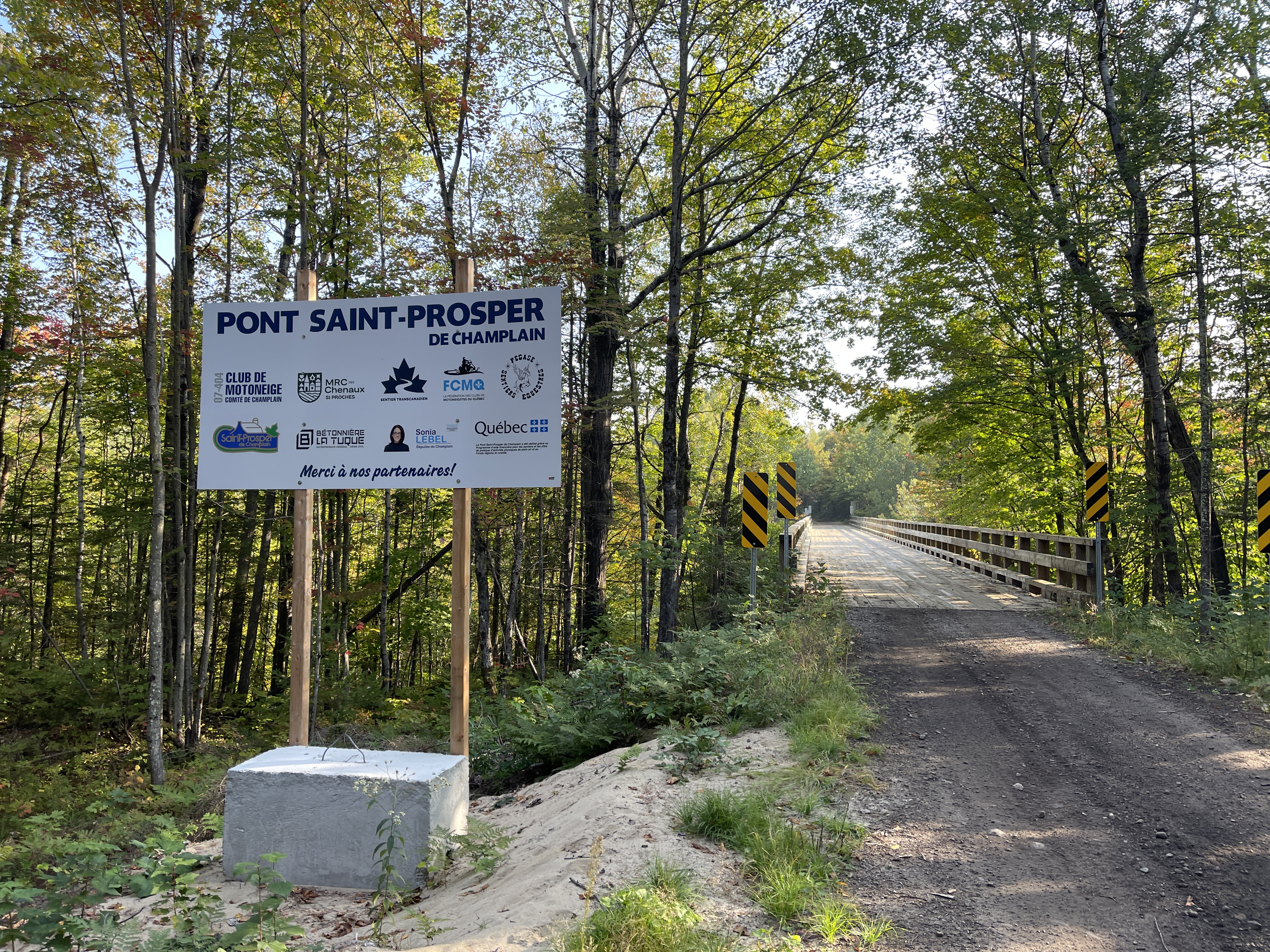
Former railway line (CN) converted to the Trans Canada Trail, Saint-Prosper-de-Champlain Bridge, Quebec

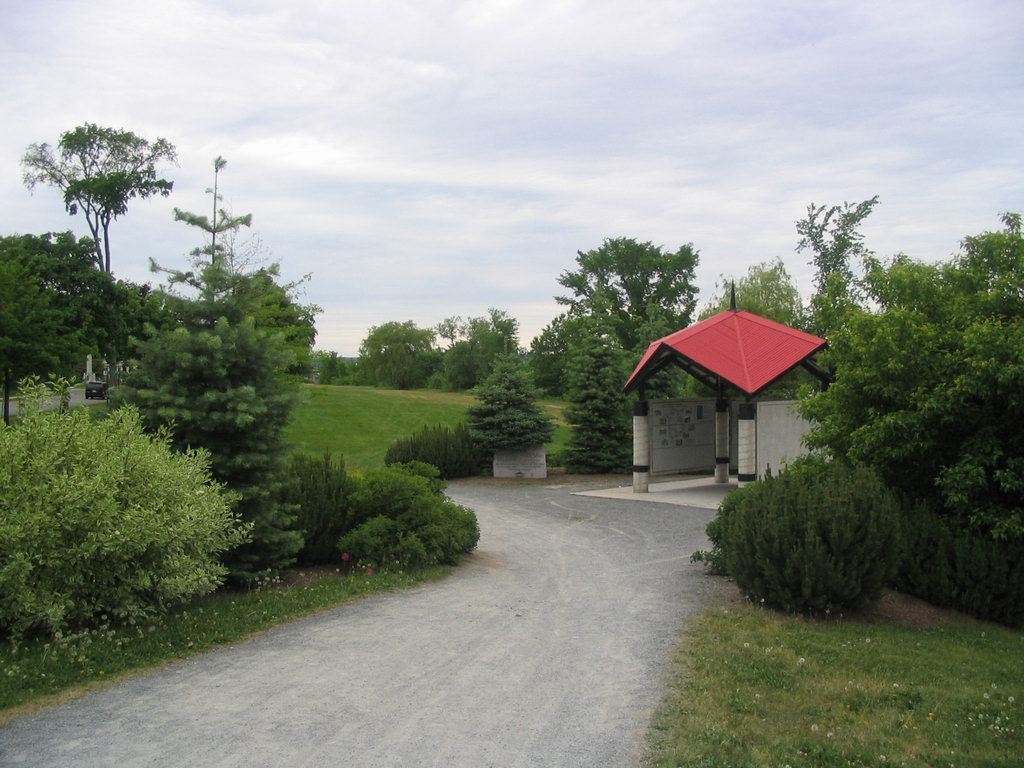
Trans Canada Trail pavilion in Fredericton, New Brunswick

== See also ==
- Canol Heritage Trail
- Chrysler Canada Greenway
- Iron Horse Trail, Alberta
- Iron Horse Trail, Ontario
- Lake Charles Trail
- Musquodoboit Trailway
- Parc Linéaire Le P'tit Train du Nord
- Riverfront Trail, Greater Moncton
- Rideau Trail
- Trans America Trail
