= Scotch Lake =

Scotch Lake may refer to:

- Scotch Lake, New Brunswick, Canada
- Scotch Lake, Nova Scotia, Canada
- Scotch Lake, in Le Sueur County, Minnesota
