= Shogomoc River Pedestrian Bridge =

Suspension bridge in Lakeland Ridges, New Brunswick, Canada

Coordinates: 45.95619°N 67.33071°W

Shogomoc River Pedestrian Bridge is a 265-foot suspension bridge in Lakeland Ridges, New Brunswick. It officially opened in October 2011. It is part of the Trans Canada Trail and the Sentier NB Trail network. Sentier NB Trail provided $305,000 toward the project. It is known as the final non-motorized trail link between the town of Grand Bay–Westfield and the border of the province of Quebec.

Valerie Pringle was present as a Trans Canada Trail representative during the ribbon cutting ceremony.
