= Rail trail =

Former railway trackbeds now used as recreational trails

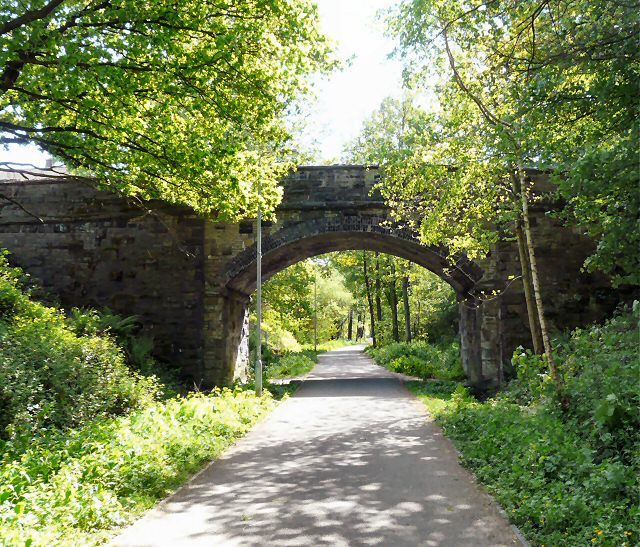
The Middlewood Way, a rail trail in north-west England

A rail trail or railway walk is a shared-use path on a railway right of way. Rail trails are typically constructed after a railway has been abandoned and the track has been removed; in addition, rails with trails share the rail corridor with active railways, light rail or with disused track. As shared-use paths, rail trails are primarily for non-motorised traffic including pedestrians, bicycles, horseback riders, skaters and cross-country skiers, although snowmobiles and all-terrain vehicles may be allowed. The characteristics of abandoned railways lend themselves to rail trails and account for their popularity; these include gentle grades, well-engineered rights of way and structures (bridges and tunnels), and passage through historical areas. Many rail trails are long-distance trails, while some shorter rail trails are known as greenways or linear parks.

== Rail trails around the world ==
=== Asia ===
==== Singapore ====
In 2010, the Singaporean and Malaysian governments agreed to move the Singapore terminus of the Keretapi Tanah Melayu Berhad (KTMB) from the Tanjong Pagar railway station in the south to Woodlands Train Checkpoint in the north. This resulted in the railway lines in Singapore becoming surplus, as the Woodlands terminus is just over the border from Malaysia. Government agencies, such as the Urban Redevelopment Authority (URA) and the Singapore Land Authority (SLA), have taken responsibility for developing and implementing ideas and activities for the former rail lands. An example of activities permitted include street art on a section of the disused railway, supported by the SLA, URA, Land Transport Authority and the National Arts Council.

The disused railway consists of the main line from the Tanjong Pagar railway station to Woodlands, extending either 24 km (15 mi) or 26 km (16 mi), depending on the source. There is also the Jurong spur line, 14 km (8.7 mi) in length. The area occupied by the railways is at least 80 ha (200 acres), and up to 173.7 ha (429 acres) when the land around Tanjong Pagar station and other nodes are included. Given the location of the railway lands in land-scarce Singapore, there was concern that the lands would be developed. Organisations such as the Nature Society Singapore developed comprehensive plans to maintain the rail lands for nature-related pursuits. The Green Corridor website is a campaign website dedicated to preserving its natural form.

=== Europe ===
==== Belgium ====
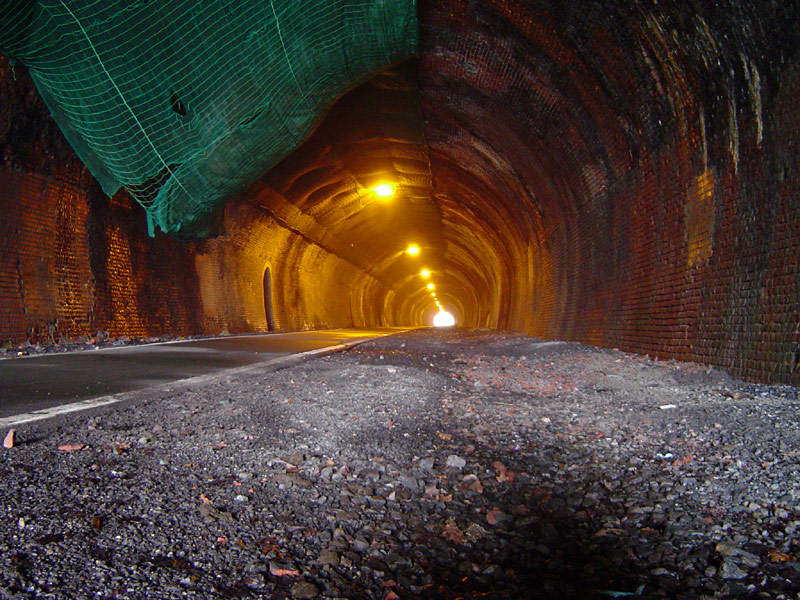
A former railway tunnel, near Houyet, now converted to pedestrian and bicycle use

The RAVeL network in Belgium combines converted tracks, byways and towpaths, adding up to a total of 1,200 km (750 mi), a significant figure considering the size of the country. The gradient is never more than six per cent and the tracks are open to all forms of non-motorised travellers, including cyclists, horse-riders, hikers and even roller-bladers.

There is also the Vennbahn, which runs along an unusual border between Belgium and Germany.

==== Finland ====
Baana is an old cargo railway track in Helsinki, which was converted into a pedestrian and bicycle trail.

==== Germany ====
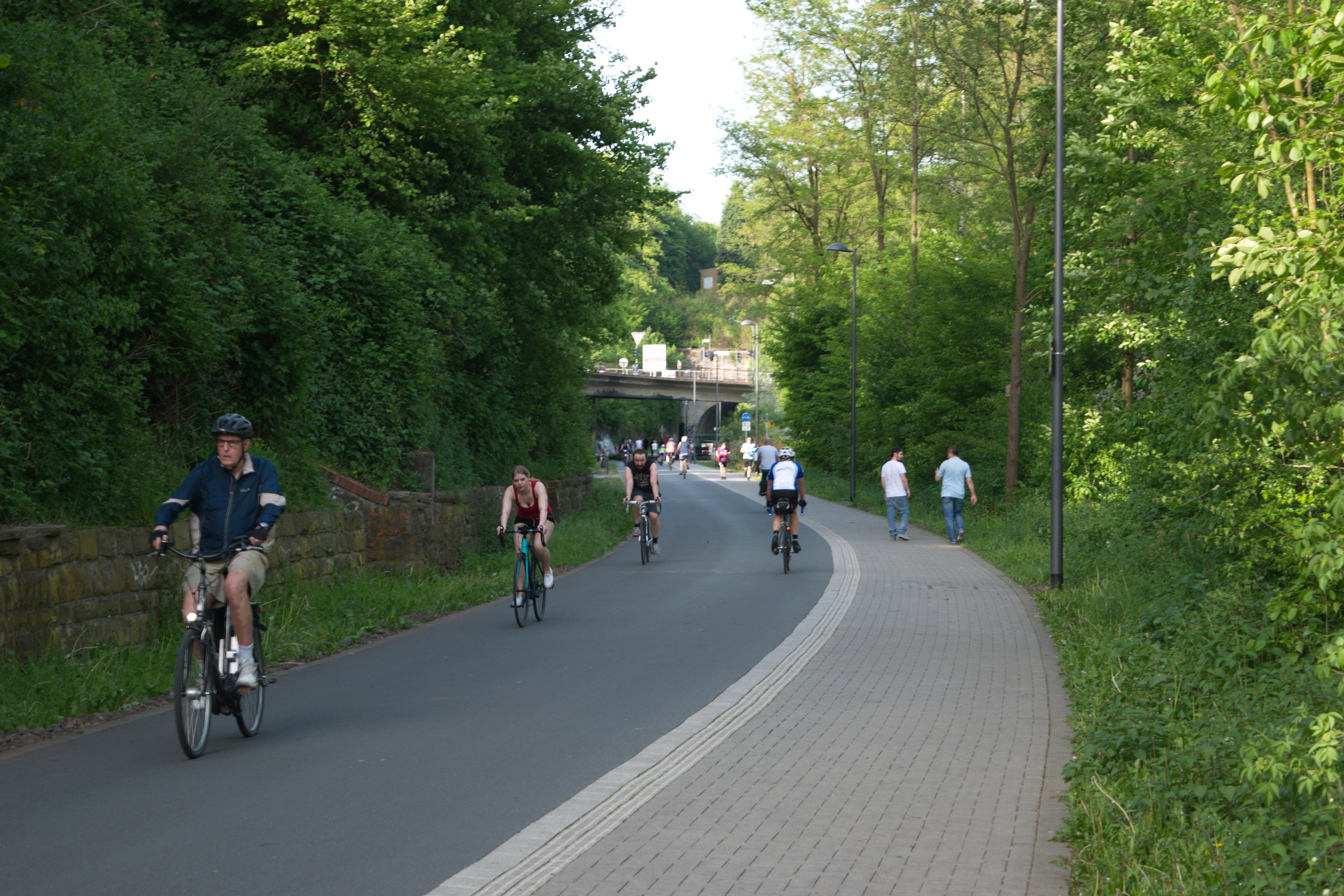
The "Nordbahntrasse" in Wuppertal

Germany has the largest number of rail trails in Europe; in February 2015, there were 677, with a total length of 5,020 km (3,120 mi). There are 80 more projects being planned or under construction. Some of the longest rail trails are in the state of Rhineland-Palatinate; these are the Maare-Mosel-Radweg with 39 km (24 mi) on the old rail track, the Ruwer-Hochwald-Radweg with 44 km (27 mi) on the old rail track, and the Schinderhannes-Radweg with 36 km (22 mi) on the old track of the Hunsrück Railway. To date, the 23 km (14 mi)-long Nordbahntrasse in Wuppertal is still the rail trail with the highest standard in Germany and is a prime example of conversion of an abandoned railway track into a shared-use path.

==== Ireland ====
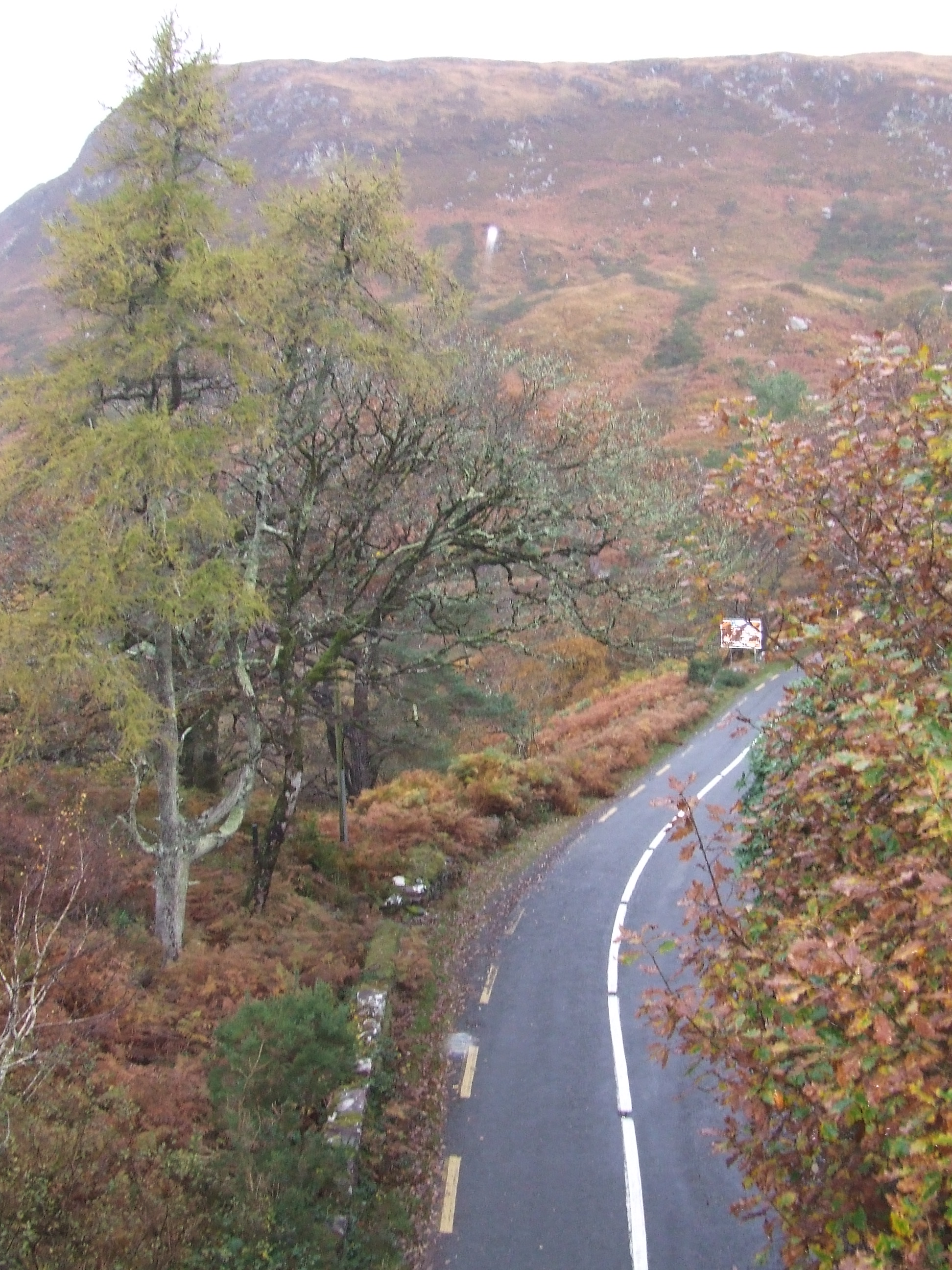
The Great Western Greenway

Cuts to Ireland's once expansive rail network in the mid-20th century left the country with a vast network of disused railways. While many lines were ripped up and the sections of the land acquired by private owners, a number of former railways are extant, thus providing the option for the development of many rail trails in the future.

The rail-trail on the former Westport to Achill Island line, known as the Great Western Greenway, was completed in 2011. Much progress has been made on the development of a rail-trail on the former Limerick to Tralee/Fenit line, in the form of the Great Southern Trail. As of 2013, a 36 km (22 mi) section from Rathkeale to Abbeyfeale has been completed.

Planning permission has been granted to redevelop the former Galway to Clifden railway into a greenway, but negotiations are still underway with landowners regarding its routing. A section of the Waterford, Limerick and Western Railway railway line, from Claremorris to Collooney, has been touted for redevelopment as a greenway, but has met with some recent opposition from groups wishing for re-establishment of the railway itself.

==== Spain ====
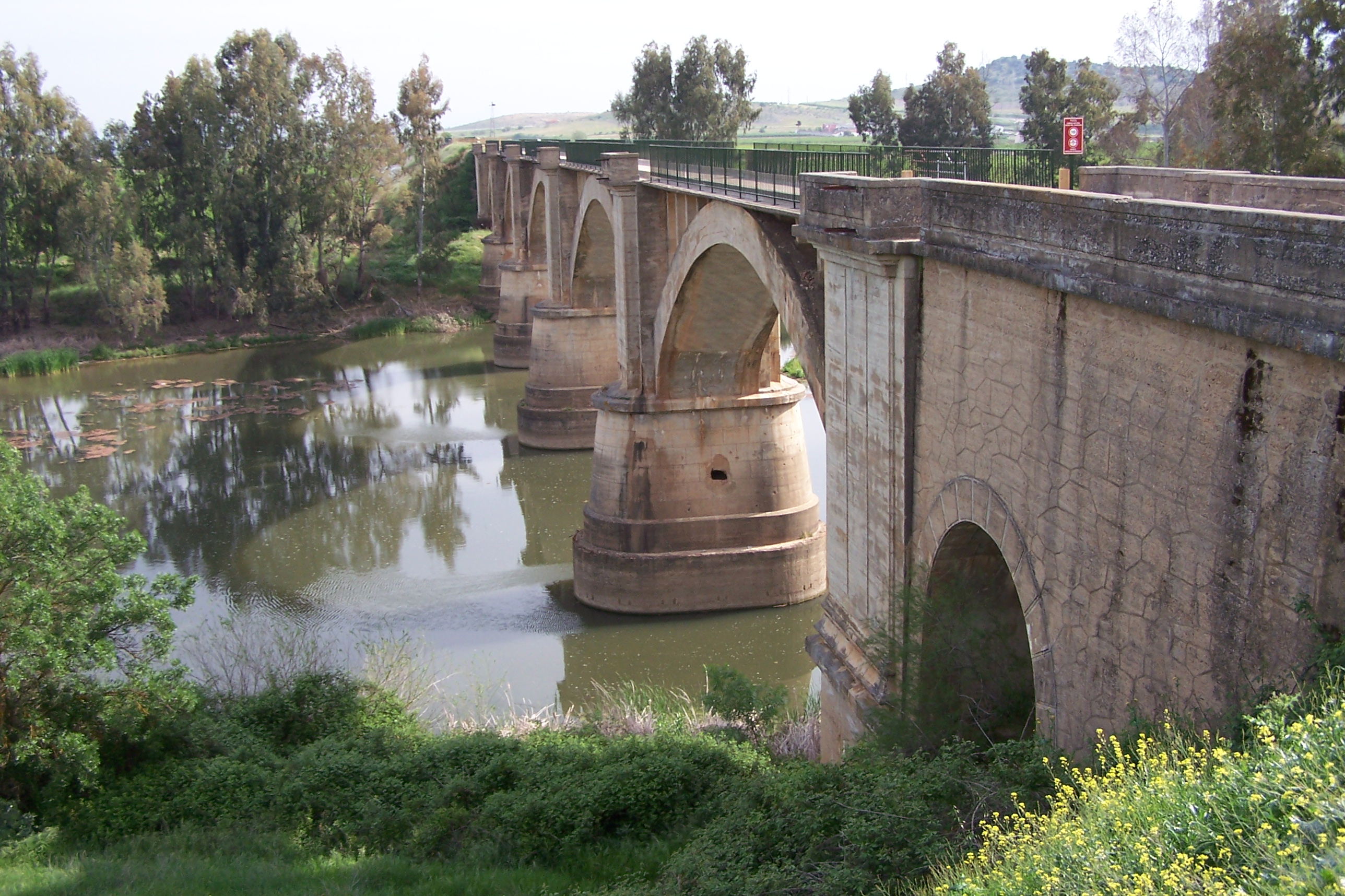
A bridge along the Vía Verde de las Vegas del Guadiana y las Villuercas

With more than 2,500 kilometres (1,553 mi) of rail trails (Via Verde) in a network of 117 cycling and walking itineraries, Spain ranks high in the European greenways scene. The trails are managed or coordinated by the Spanish Railways Foundation, an institution created in 1985. Many of the converted tracks were originally built for the mining industry, connecting remote mountain sites with port locations on the coast; they now offer picturesque rides from wild interior landscapes to the seaside, following near-flat routes with long-spanning viaducts and bridges, plus a number of tunnels.

==== United Kingdom ====
With almost 150 lines in use, the United Kingdom has the second-largest network of rail trails in Europe, after Germany. The development of rail trails in the United Kingdom grew after a major programme of railway line closures in the 1960s, known as the Beeching cuts. The scheme, named after Dr. Richard Beeching, the then chairman of British Railways, recommended the decommissioning of approximately 5,000 miles (8,000 km) of railway lines all over Great Britain. Many rural and suburban lines were closed, along with selected main line trunk routes. Since then, approximately 1,200–2,200 miles (1,900–3,500 km) of disused railway lines in Britain have been converted to public leisure purposes; today, the majority of rail trails are maintained by either the local authority or charitable organisations, such as Sustrans, the Railway Ramblers or Railway Paths. A 31-mile (50 km) section (between Braunton and Meeth) of the Tarka Trail in Devon is one of the longest of these.

Many of these former railway lines form part of the British National Cycle Network, connecting with long-distance paths and towpaths along Britain's extensive network of canals. For example, the Milton Keynes redway system runs throughout theiscity in Buckinghamshire, England, using parts of the former trackbed of the former Wolverton to Newport Pagnell Line (closed 1962) and the Grand Union Canal towpath; together, these paths form part of the long-distance National Cycle Network Route 6 and Route 51.

Other urban and suburban rail trails include the:

- Fallowfield Loop Line in Greater Manchester
- Middlewood Way in Cheshire and Greater Manchester; and
- Ebury Way in Watford.

Notable rural rail trails include the:

- Dava Way, running along the route of the former Highland Railway between Grantown and Forres in the Scottish Highlands
- High Peak Trail, in the Peak District of England.

In London, a more unusual scheme has been proposed to convert some disused London Underground tunnels into subterranean rail trails under the city, but this scheme has not been officially approved.

=== North America ===
==== Bermuda ====
The Bermuda Railway ceased to operate as such when the only carrier to exist in Bermuda folded in 1948. Some of the former rights of way were converted for automobile traffic; in 1984, 18 miles were converted to a rail trail, reserved for pedestrian use and bicycles on paved portions. The rail bed spans the length of the island and connects Hamilton to St. George's and several villages, though several bridges are derelict, causing the trail to be fragmented.

==== Canada ====
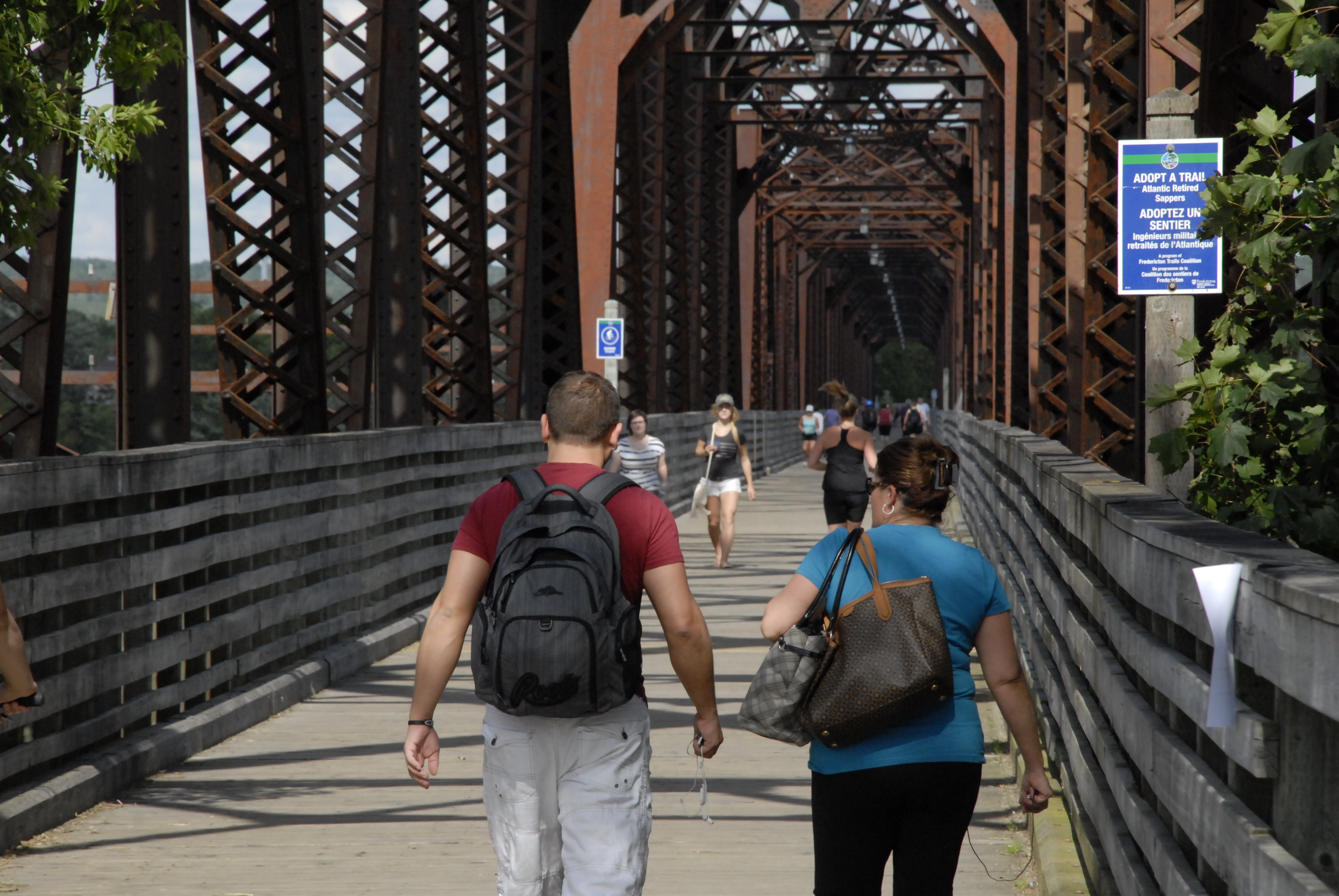
Bill Thorpe Walking Bridge in Fredericton

The Kettle Valley Rail Trail in British Columbia uses a rail corridor that was originally built for the now-abandoned Kettle Valley Railway. The trail was developed during the 1990s after the Canadian Pacific Railway abandoned the train service.

The longest rail trail in Canada is the Newfoundland T'Railway that covers a distance of 883 km (549 mi). Protected as a linear park under the provincial park system, the T'Railway consists of the railbed of the historic Newfoundland Railway as transferred from its most recent owner, Canadian National Railway, to the provincial government after rail service was abandoned on the island of Newfoundland in 1988. The rail corridor stretches from Channel-Port aux Basques in the west to St. John's in the east with branches to Stephenville, Lewisporte, Bonavista, Placentia and Carbonear.

Following the abandonment of the Prince Edward Island Railway in 1989, the government of Prince Edward Island purchased the right-of-way to the entire railway system. The Confederation Trail was developed as a tip-to-tip walking/cycling gravel rail trail which doubles as a monitored and groomed snowmobile trail during the winter months, operated by the PEI Snowmobile Association.

In Quebec, Le P'tit Train du Nord runs 200 km (120 mi) from Saint-Jérôme to Mont-Laurier.

In Toronto, there are two rail trails: the Beltline Trail and the West Toronto Railpath.

In central Ontario, the former Victoria Railway line, which runs 89 kilometres (55 mi) from the town of Lindsay, Ontario, north to the village of Haliburton, in Haliburton County, serves as a public recreation trail. It can be used for cross-country skiing, walking and snowmobiling in the winter months, with walking, cycling and horse riding from spring to autumn. The majority of the rail trail passes through sparsely populated areas of the Canadian Shield, with historic trestle bridges crossing several rivers.

The old Sarnia Bridge in St. Marys, Ontario, was re-purposed as part of the Grand Trunk Trail. The former Grand Trunk Railway viaduct was purchased from Canadian National Railway in 1995. The Grand Trunk Trail was opened in 1998, with over 3 km (1.9 mi) of paved and accessible trail. In 2012, the repurposing of the Sarnia Bridge was inducted into the North America Railway Hall of Fame.

A railroad between Gateway Road and Raleigh Street (i.e. streets immediately parallel to the railway on each side) in Winnipeg, Manitoba, was turned into a 7 km (4.3 mi) asphalt trail in 2007. It is called the Northeast Pioneers Greenway; there are plans for expansion into East St. Paul and eventually to Birds Hill Park.

In Nova Scotia, almost every section of the Trans Canada Trail and other walking trails follows abandoned railways. A small railway line from Musquodoboit Harbour (Musquodoboit Trailway) to Dartmouth is nearly fully used by community members and tourists. Another extremely large section is used from Halifax Grand Pre, via New Germany and Yarmouth.

A considerable part of the Trans Canada Trail is repurposed former railway lines donated to provincial governments by CP and CN rail rebuilt as walking trails. The main section runs along the southern areas of Canada connecting most of Canada's major cities and most populous areas. There is also a long northern arm that runs through Alberta to Edmonton and then up through northern British Columbia to Yukon. The trail is multi-use and, depending on the section, may allow hikers, cyclists, horseback riders, cross-country skiers and snowmobilers.

==== United States ====
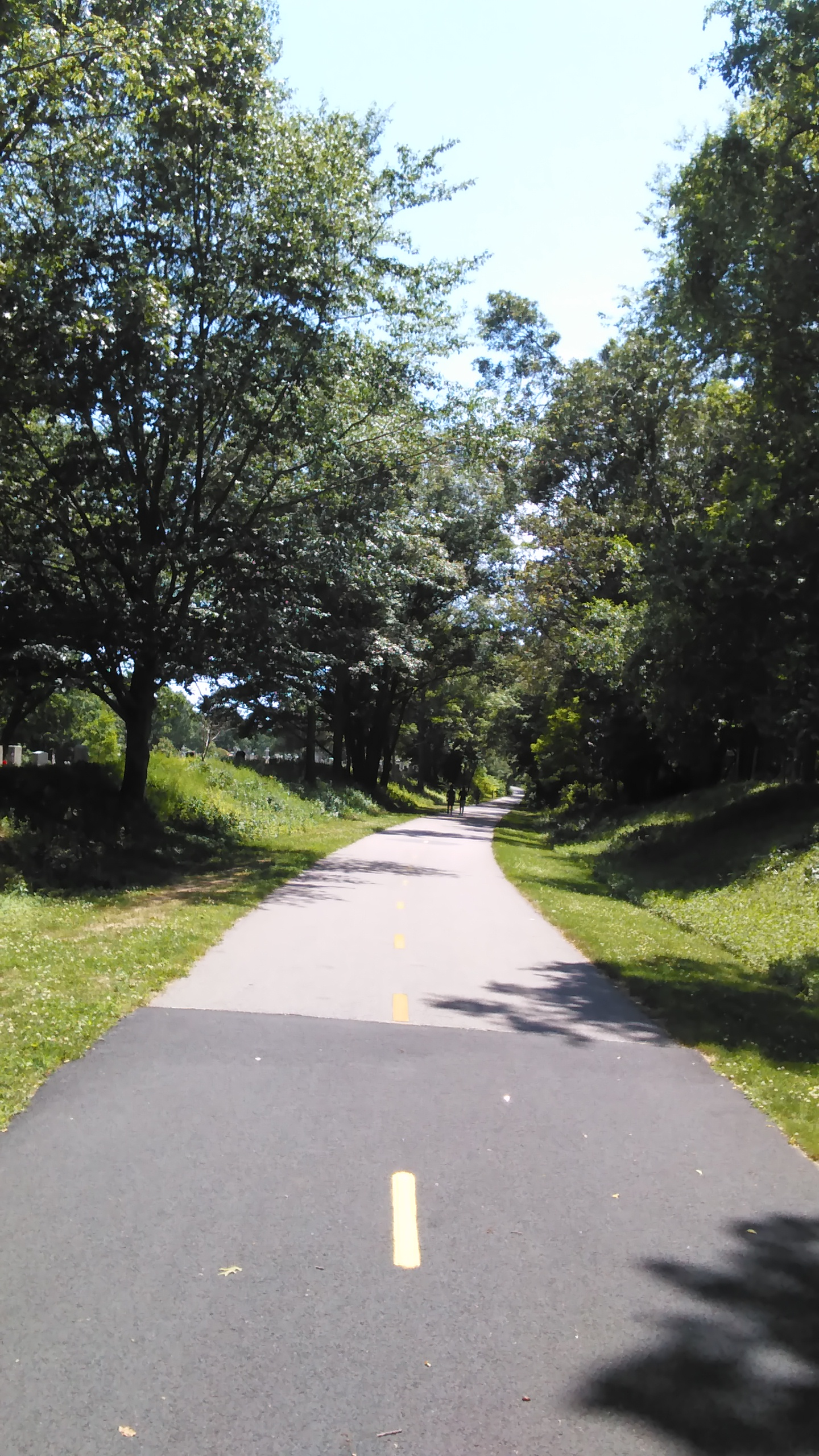
A rail trail in southern Rhode Island

In North America, the decades-long consolidation of the rail industry led to the closure of a number of uneconomical branch lines and redundant main lines. Some were maintained as short line railways, but many others were abandoned. The first abandoned rail corridor in the United States converted into a recreational trail was the Elroy-Sparta State Trail in Wisconsin, which opened in 1967; the Illinois Prairie Path opened in the following year. The conversion of rails to trails hastened with the federal government passing legislation, known as the Rails-to-Trails Act, promoting the use of railbanking for abandoned railroad corridors. This law was passed in 1983 and upheld by the U.S. Supreme Court in 1990. This process preserves rail corridors for possible future rail use, with interim use as a trail. By the 1970s, even main lines were being sold or abandoned; this was especially true when regional rail lines merged and streamlined their operations. As both the supply of potential trails increased and awareness of the possibilities rose, state governments, municipalities, conservation authorities and private organisations bought the railway corridors to create, expand or link green spaces.

The longest developed rail trail is currently the 240-mile-long (390 km) Katy Trail in Missouri. When complete, the Cowboy Trail in Nebraska will become the second-longest, extending for 321 miles (517 km), the longest being the Ohio to Erie Trail in Ohio at 326 miles (525 km).

The Beltline, in Atlanta, Georgia, is currently under construction. In 2030, the anticipated year of completion, it will be one of the longest continuous trails. The Atlanta Beltline is a sustainable redevelopment project that will provide a network of public parks, multi-use trails and transit along a historic 22-mile railroad corridor circling downtown and connecting many neighborhoods directly to each other.

The Rails-to-Trails Conservancy is a nationwide nonprofit group that advocates for rail trails and has many documents and advice on building a rail trail. By 2026, the U.S. has completed over 26,000 miles (41,843 km) of rail trails, of which more than 4,400 miles (7,081 km) miles were created using railbanking. In 2015, Michigan has the most total mileage, 2,381 miles (3,832 km), of any state.

=== Oceania ===
==== Australia ====
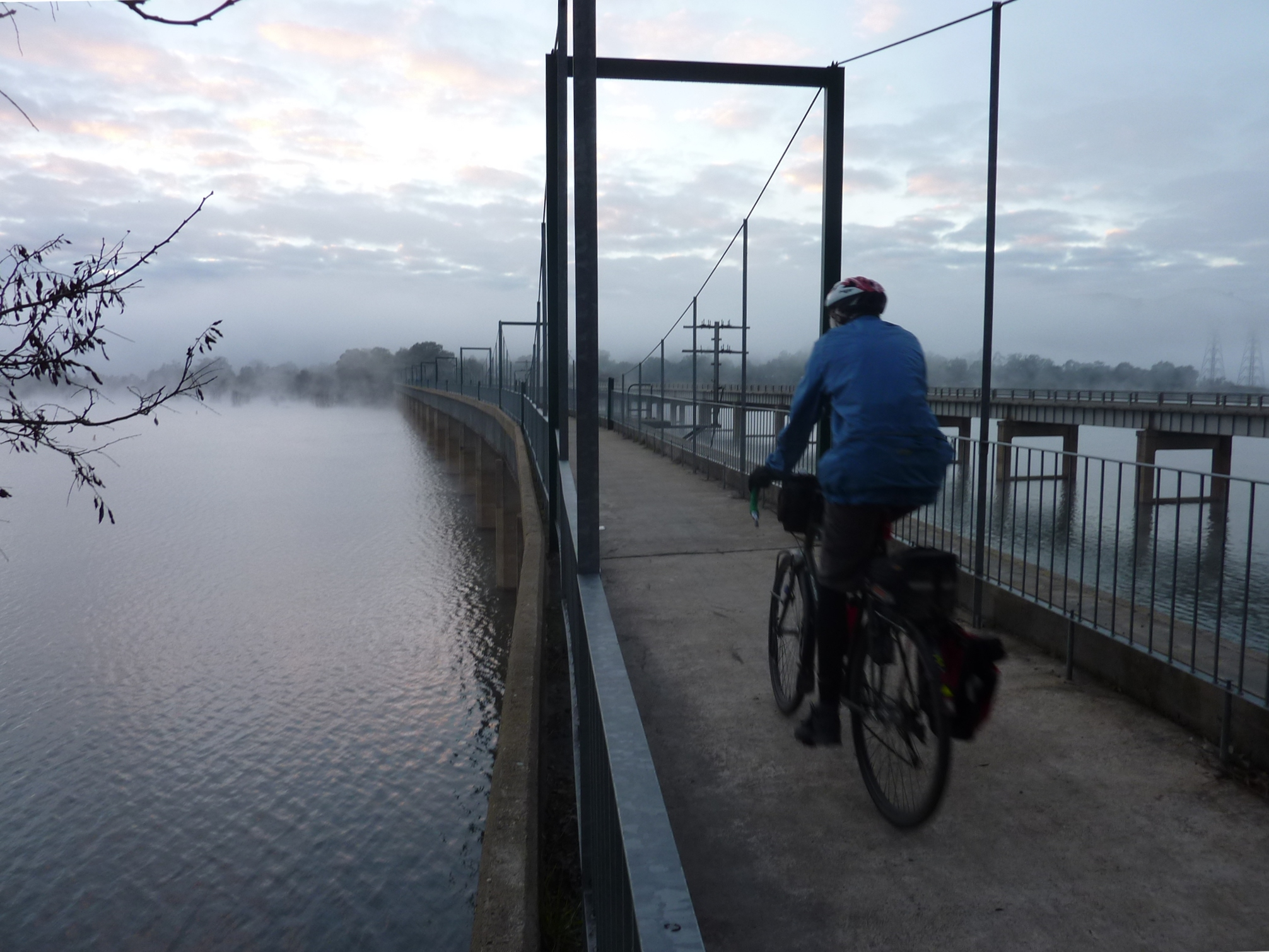
The Great Victorian Rail Trail bridge at Bonnie Doon, Victoria

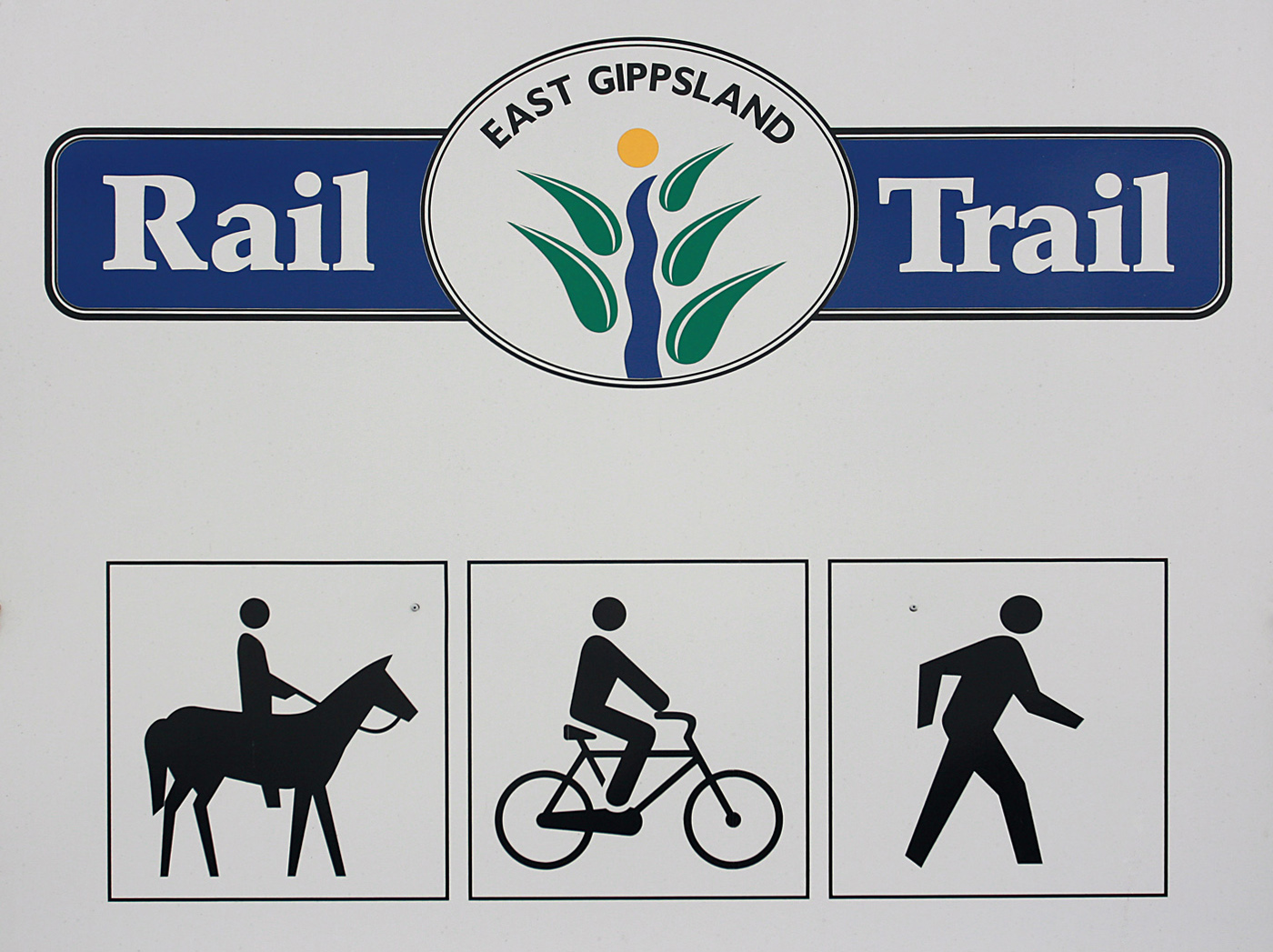
East Gippsland Rail Trail signage in Victoria, indicating the shared trail usage

The development of rail trails in south-eastern Australia can be traced to the gold rushes of the second half of the 19th century. Dozens of rail lines sprang up, aided by the overly enthusiastic "Octopus Act", but soon became unprofitable as the gold ran out, leading to a decreased demand for timber in turn. Decades later, these easements found a new use as tourist drawcards, once converted to rail trails. Dozens exist in some form, like the 37 km (23 mi) Port Fairy to Warrnambool Rail Trail, but only a few – such as the 95-kilometre (59 mi) Murray to the Mountains Rail Trail — have been fully developed. Progress is frequently hampered by trestle bridges in unsafe condition, easements that have been sold off to farmers, and a lack of funds. Funding is typically contributed in roughly equal parts from federal, state and local governments, with voluntary labour and in-kind donations contributed by local groups.

The latest addition to the Rail Trail scene in Victoria is The Great Victorian Rail Trail which is the longest rail trail in the state, covering 134 km (83 mi). It has become popular with tourists as it meanders through steep valleys and open farm country. The Rail Trails Australia website is a good source of local information about trails in Australia.

==== New Zealand ====
A number of rail trails have been established through New Zealand; the best known are the Hauraki Rail Trail (linking Thames, Paeroa, Te Aroha and Waikino/Waihi), Otago Central Rail Trail and the Little River Rail Trail. The New Zealand Cycle Trail project, a Government-led initiative, will greatly accelerate the establishment of new trails. The first seven projects (Note: Not all of them rail trails, though.) were announced in July 2009 and will receive NZ$9m in funding of the total project budget of NZ$50m.

== Urban rail trail parks ==
In a number of cities, disused railway tracks have been converted into linear parks. One example is the High Line (also known as "High Line Park"), a 1.45-mile-long (2.33 km) linear park created on an elevated section of a disused New York Central Railroad. Inspired by the 3-mile-long (4.8 km) Promenade plantée (tree-lined walkway), a similar project in Paris completed in 1993, the High Line has been redesigned and planted as an aerial greenway and rails-to-trails park.

== Conversion issues ==
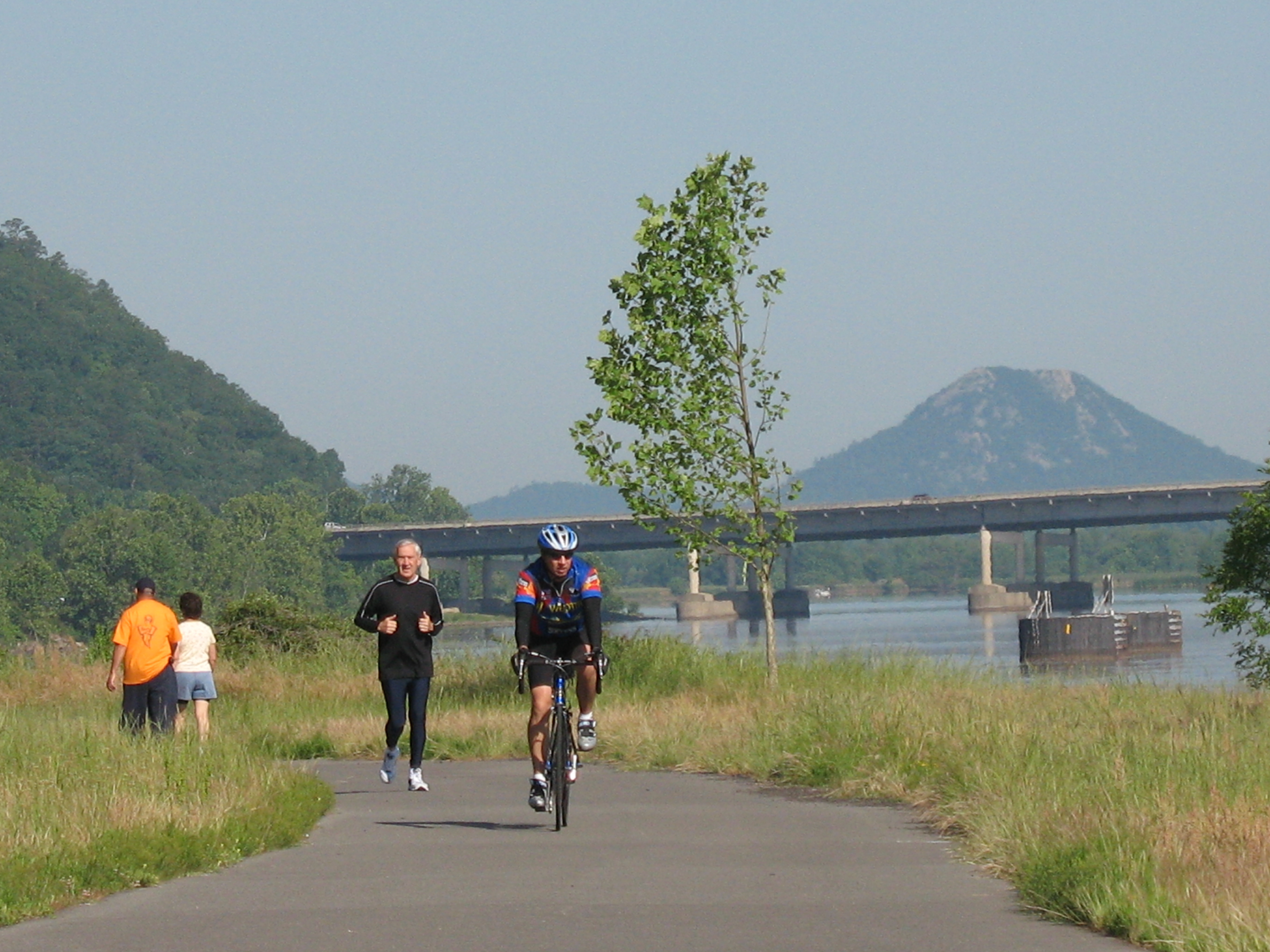
Cyclists and joggers on the Arkansas River Trail in Little Rock, Arkansas

Railroads in North America were often built with a mix of purchased land, government land grants and easements. The land deeds can be over a century old; land grants might be conditional upon continuous operation of the line and easements may have expired, all of which are expensive and difficult issues to determine in law.

Railroad property rights have often been poorly defined and sporadically enforced, with neighbouring property owners intentionally or accidentally using land they do not own; such encroachers often later oppose a rail-to-trail conversion. Even residents who are not encroaching on railway lands may oppose conversion on the grounds of increased traffic in the area and the possibility of a decline in personal security. Special laws regulate the abandonment of a railroad corridor because linear corridors of land are only valuable if they are intact. In the United States, the Surface Transportation Board (STB) regulates railroads and can allow a corridor to be "Rail Banked" or placed on hold for possible conversion back to active status when or if future need demands.

While many rail trails have been built, other proposals have been cancelled by community opposition. The stature of the conversion organisation, community involvement and government willingness are key factors.

On the other hand, there are a growing number of cases where existing rails and infrastructure, in service or not, are being called to be torn up for trails. Two cases of this are in New York State, against the Catskill Mountain Railroad in Kingston, New York, and the Adirondack Scenic Railroad in Old Forge, New York. In Connecticut, the not-in-service section of track on the Valley Railroad has been proposed by locals to be converted to trail. Though perceived by residents to be, as it has not carried a train since the 1960s, the railroad has never been formally abandoned. The Connecticut Department of Energy and Environmental Protection acquired the line from Penn Central in 1969 and subsequently signed a long-term lease with the railroad. The railroad has been continually working to bring this section of the line back into service. Both Departments strongly support the preservation of the line, and have provided support to the railroad with property encroachment from abutters and the provision of railroad ties. All three of these examples are heritage railroads, which serve to protect the history of the railroad. Their primary revenue is tourist operations, so rail traffic is seasonal; though all three have been granted rights to carry freight, should customers show interest.

=== Trails to rails ===
Though rare, there are several cases in which trails convert back to active railroads. One example occurred in 2012 in Clarence, Pennsylvania, where the R.J. Corman Railroad Company received permission to rebuild 20 miles (32 km) of railbanked line to serve new industries. Conrail had ceased operating over the line in 1990, and 10 miles (16 km) was converted to the Snow Shoe Rails to Trails.

== Typical features ==
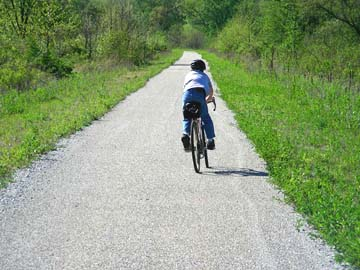
Bicyclist on the Conotton Creek Trail in Ohio

Most original railway lines were surveyed for ease of transport and gentle (often less than 2%) grades. Therefore, the rail trails that succeeded them are often fairly straight and ideally suited to overcome steep or awkward terrain, such as hills, escarpments, rivers and swamps. Rail trails often share space with linear utilities, such as pipelines, electrical transmission wires and telephone lines.

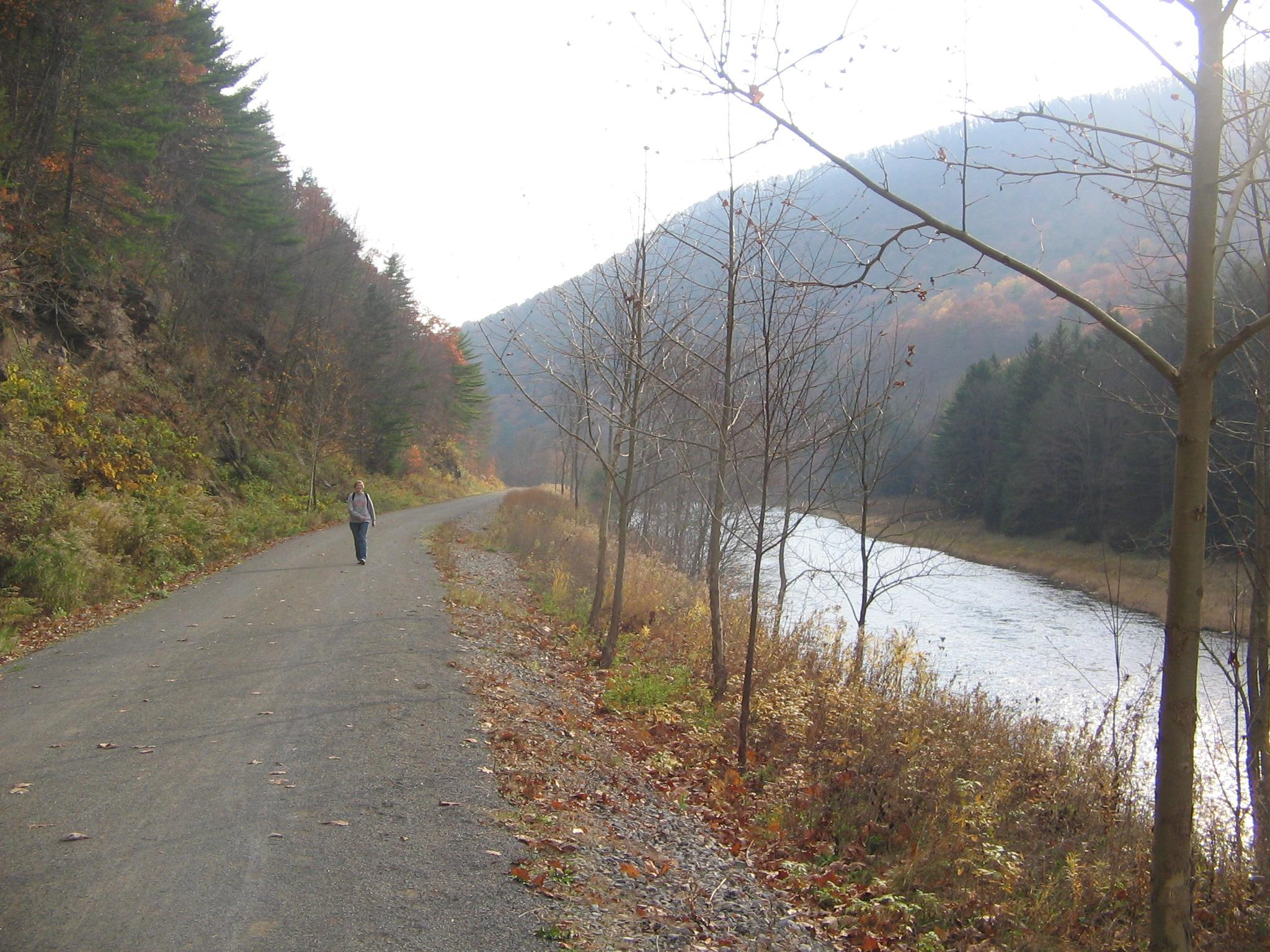
Hiker on the Pine Creek Rail Trail in Pennsylvania

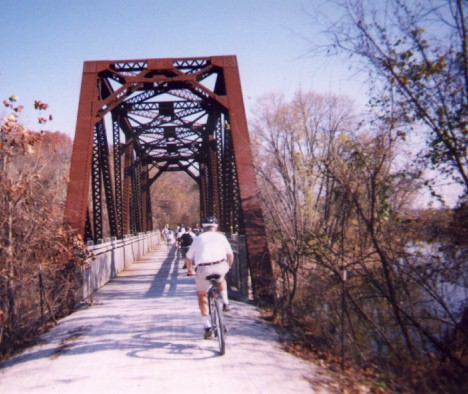
The Katy Trail crosses a creek on a preserved rail bridge in Missouri

Most purchase of railway land is dictated by the free market value of the land, so that land in urban and industrial cores is often impractical to purchase and convert. Therefore, rail trails may end on the fringes of urban areas or near industrial areas and resume later, as discontinuous portions of the same rail line, separated by unaffordable or inappropriate land.

A railroad right-of-way width varies based on the terrain, with a 100 feet (30 m) width being ample enough where little surface grading is required. The initial 705 miles (1,135 km) stretch of the Illinois Central Railroad is the most liberal in the world, with a width of 200 feet (61 m) along the whole length of the line. Rail trails are often graded and covered in gravel or crushed stone, although some are paved with asphalt and others are left as dirt. Where rail bridges are incorporated into the trail, the only alterations (if any) tend to be adding solid walking areas on top of ties or trestles, though bridges in poorer condition do receive new guardrails, paint and reinforcement. If paved, they are especially suitable for people who use wheelchairs.

Where applicable, the same trails used in the summer for walking, jogging and inline skating can be used in the winter for Nordic skiing, snowshoeing and sometimes snowmobiling.

== Rails with trails ==
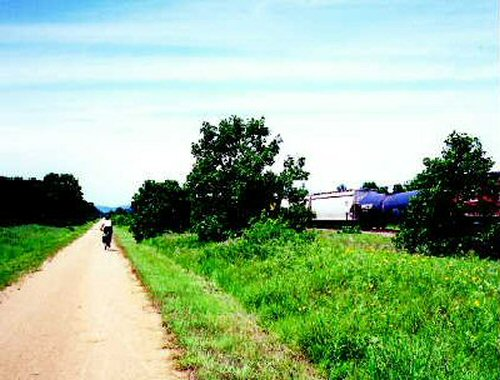
A "rail with trail" in the United States; train at right

Rails with trails are a small subset of rail trails in which a railway right-of-way remains in use by trains yet also has a parallel recreational trail. Hundreds of kilometres of rails with trails exist in Europe, North America, Australia and the United Arab Emirates.

== See also ==
- Bustitution – Substitution of railway services by buses
- Cycleway
- EuroVelo, a network of long-distance cycling routes across Europe
- Greenway (landscape)
- List of rail trails
- Marvin M. Brandt Revocable Trust v. United States
- Outline of cycling
- Rails with trails (along a working line)
- Rails-to-Trails Conservancy (RTC)
- Segregated cycle facilities
- Sustrans – British walking and cycling charity.
