= ProudPolitics =

- Founded: 2013
- Founders: Arthur Kong; Louroz Mercader
- Type: NGO
- Purpose: Supporting election of LGBT politicians
- Location: Toronto, Ontario, Canada
- Method: Political endorsement Networking; Leadership training
- Executive Director: Chris Matthews
- Chair: Louroz Mercader
- Website: www.proudpolitics.org

ProudPolitics is a Canadian cross-partisan organization dedicated to increasing the number of openly LGBT public officials in Canadian politics. The group was inspired by the LGBTQ Victory Fund in the United States, which offers grassroots leadership training, networking and mentoring programs for aspiring politicians who are part of the lesbian, gay, bisexual or transgender communities. Unlike the Victory Fund, however, ProudPolitics does not offer direct fundraising for candidates due to Canada's differing laws around election finance.

The organization was co-founded in 2013 by Arthur Kong, a management consultant, and Louroz Mercader, a non-profit director who was a candidate for Mississauga City Council in the 2010 municipal election. The organization's official launch, held on April 18, 2013 in Toronto, featured a keynote speech by Glen Murray, and a panel discussion featuring New Democratic Party Member of Parliament Craig Scott, former Progressive Conservative MPP Phil Gillies and Tatum Wilson, a policy advisor to Ontario Liberal premier Kathleen Wynne who unsuccessfully sought the party's nomination. The group also received a letter of support from Wynne, Canada's first openly LGBTQ provincial premier.

In 2014 and 2018, prior to municipal and provincial elections across the country, the group held Canada's first and only candidate and campaign training program, titled Out to Win.

The group's advisory council includes Gillies, chief commissioner of the Ontario Human Rights Commission and former Mayor of Toronto Barbara Hall, former federal member of parliament Bill Siksay, former Toronto District School Board trustee Nadia Bello, 2010 Toronto City Council candidate Ken Chan, Ontario Gay and Lesbian Chamber of Commerce president Ryan Tollofson, Halton Catholic District School Board trustee Paul Marai, and urban strategist and writer Tanzeel Merchant.
