= Tanzeel Merchant =

Tanzeel Merchant is a Toronto-based leader, urban designer, architect, planner and writer.

Merchant is currently the Director of the Emergency Health Services Branch at the Ministry of Health and Long-Term Care in Ontario. The branch oversees air and land ambulance services and paramedic certification and standards across Ontario.

== Career ==
From 2014 to 2017 Merchant held the role of Director of Partnerships and Consultations at the Ontario Growth Secretariat. In that role, his branch supported the review of the Growth Plan for the Greater Golden Horseshoe and plans for the Greenbelt. Prior to that he was the first and founding Executive Director of the Ryerson City Building Institute at Ryerson University in Toronto. Established in 2012, the Institute was created to focus on research, teaching, engagement and communication on issues relevant to city regions nationally and globally.

Since the early 2000s Merchant has played some key roles in developing and shaping Ontario’s award-winning growth management framework and urban planning policies and projects. For a two year period, he was also invited to work in Alberta by the Regional Municipality of Wood Buffalo, the Government of Alberta, and the energy industry in the rapidly growing Athabasca Oil Sands region. During his time there he led the development of a growth management, infrastructure and development plan for the region.

On 1 July 2014, Merchant was featured in the Toronto Star's Canada Day edition of 24 Canadians whose ideas will shape the future. The Star introduced his feature as "Toronto planner doing oil patch work sees need to reconcile the many directions we’re headed — such as oil dependence, an aging rural Canada — to ensure we become the advanced, mobile, tolerant society of our dreams." In the article, he discusses his views on evolving identities, Canada's relationship with the oil sands and the challenges that an ageing nation faces.

On 5 December 2014, excerpts of Merchant's interview from the Possible Canadas project were published in The Globe and Mail. The "Possible Canadas is a project created by Reos Partners, the J.W. McConnell Family Foundation and a diverse coalition of philanthropic and community organizations.".

Merchant has also been interviewed twice by the CBC's Matt Galloway on the Metro Morning radio show. In the first interview on 10 November 2014, he talked about what city building means and the role the Ryerson City Building Institute, that he heads, will play in addressing that mandate. In the second interview on 6 February 2015, he discussed what losing the long-form national census means for urban planning.

Merchant is a regular contributor to Forbes Magazine's Indian edition. on matters of the economy and policy. He has also written intermittently on design, such as his first-hand narrative on his involvement in the Regent Park redevelopment project. The Regent Park Revitalization Plan went on to win the Canadian Institute of Planners' Award of Excellence in 2003.

He is also a founder and former board member of the Pan Am Path, an urban project to create a multi-use path that connects Toronto’s trails and creates an active-living legacy for the 2015 Pan Am/2015 Parapan American Games. In 2012, Merchant was named one of 28 DiverseCity Fellows in the Greater Toronto Area. He also serves as an advisor to the Metcalf Foundation's Enabling Solutions program and sits on the advisory council of ProudPolitics. Merchant served on the board of the Canadian Urban Institute from 2014 to 2015. From 2006 to 2014, Merchant served on the board of Heritage Toronto and also chaired the organisation's Awards Committee.

Merchant has lived in Mumbai, Ahmedabad, New Delhi, and Delft before choosing to study and live in Toronto.
