= Musquodoboit Trailway =

Multiuse trail in Nova Scotia, Canada

Coordinates: 44.791°N 63.150°W

- Length: 14.5 km (9.0 mi)
- Location: Nova Scotia, Canada
- Trailheads: Gibralter; Musquodoboit Harbour
- Use: Hiking; running; cycling; skateboarding; cross-country skiing
- Difficulty: Accessible–to–easy
- Hazards: Rough terrain on spur trails
Trail map

The Musquodoboit Trailway is a 14.5-kilometre-long (9.0 mi) multiuse rail trail located in Halifax County, Nova Scotia, running the distance from Gibralter to Musquodoboit Harbour. The entire route is part of the Halifax spur of The Great Trail, and follows Nova Scotia Route 357 for its length.

== History ==
The railbed that the trail uses was originally built by the Intercolonial Railway just prior to World War I and absorbed into Canadian National when the Government of Canada created it. The rails originally ran from Dartmouth to Upper Musquodoboit, hauling timber, gravel, and agricultural goods, as well as passengers. An extension to Guysborough was planned, but never materialized.

== Route ==
The trailway begins at the Musquodoboit Harbour Railway Museum, but it mostly considered starting at Park Road, a few hundred meters north of Nova Scotia Trunk 7 in Musquodoboit Harbour, and almost immediately crosses the Trestle Bridge, a 40-metre-long (130 ft) steel truss bridge over the Musquodoboit River, offering a view of its extensive and largely undeveloped flood plains. Soon thereafter, the old Bayer Mill Road is passed on the left, and to the right, tall granite cliffs of the Eastern Shore Granite Ridge become visible, some reaching up to 100 m (330 ft) in height. Aptly named Little Lake is passed around the 1 km mark, and a turnoff to the Admiral Lake Trail is present at 2 km (1.2 mi).

For about a kilometer, the trailway is squeezed between steep granite cliffs of the Eastern Shore Granite Ridge on the eastern side and Bayer Lake to the left. An intersection to the Bayer Lake Loop Trail (which goes along the top of the cliffs) is present at 2.4 km (1.5 mi), and a few hundred meters beyond that lies the first picnic table.

Beyond the picnic table lie the Turtle Cove bridge, a wooden trestle bridge, and another trailhead for the Admiral Lake Loop, as well as the South Granite Ridge Trail. From this point onwards the trail passes mainly through the rich lower Musquodoboit Valley, sometimes approaching the granite cliffs to the east, sometimes with glimpses of the river to the west. At around the halfway point is Norma's Place, a picnic shelter, and a connection to the North and South Granite Ridge Trails.

The trail continues over Kelly's Meadow Bridge and through the valley until coming to another picnic table at 11 km (6.8 mi). Here it enters thicker forest, and the last 2 km (1.2 mi) run right next to Highway 357 and a steep granite embankment. A trailhead to Gibralter Rock Loop and the North Granite Ridge trail is present at 13.5 km (8.4 mi).

== Spur rails ==
Aside from the main trail, the Musquodoboit Trailways association maintains several trails that go up into the Eastern Shore Granite Ridge to the east of the main trail. These trails are for hiking only narrow, rugged, and have steep grades.

== Skull Rock ==
This is a lookout off of a side trail known as Admiral Lake Loop Trail. The lookout is set on a mountain that resembles a skull. The lookout has a picnic spot. A women fell off of the rock in the late 2010s.
