= Rankinville =

Community in Nova Scotia, Canada

Coordinates: 46°3′52″N 61°22′3″W

Rankinville in Nova Scotia

Rankinville is a locality in the Canadian province of Nova Scotia, located in Inverness County on Cape Breton Island. The area is named after its early settlers.
