= Parc Linéaire Le P'tit Train du Nord =

Recreational trail in Quebec, Canada

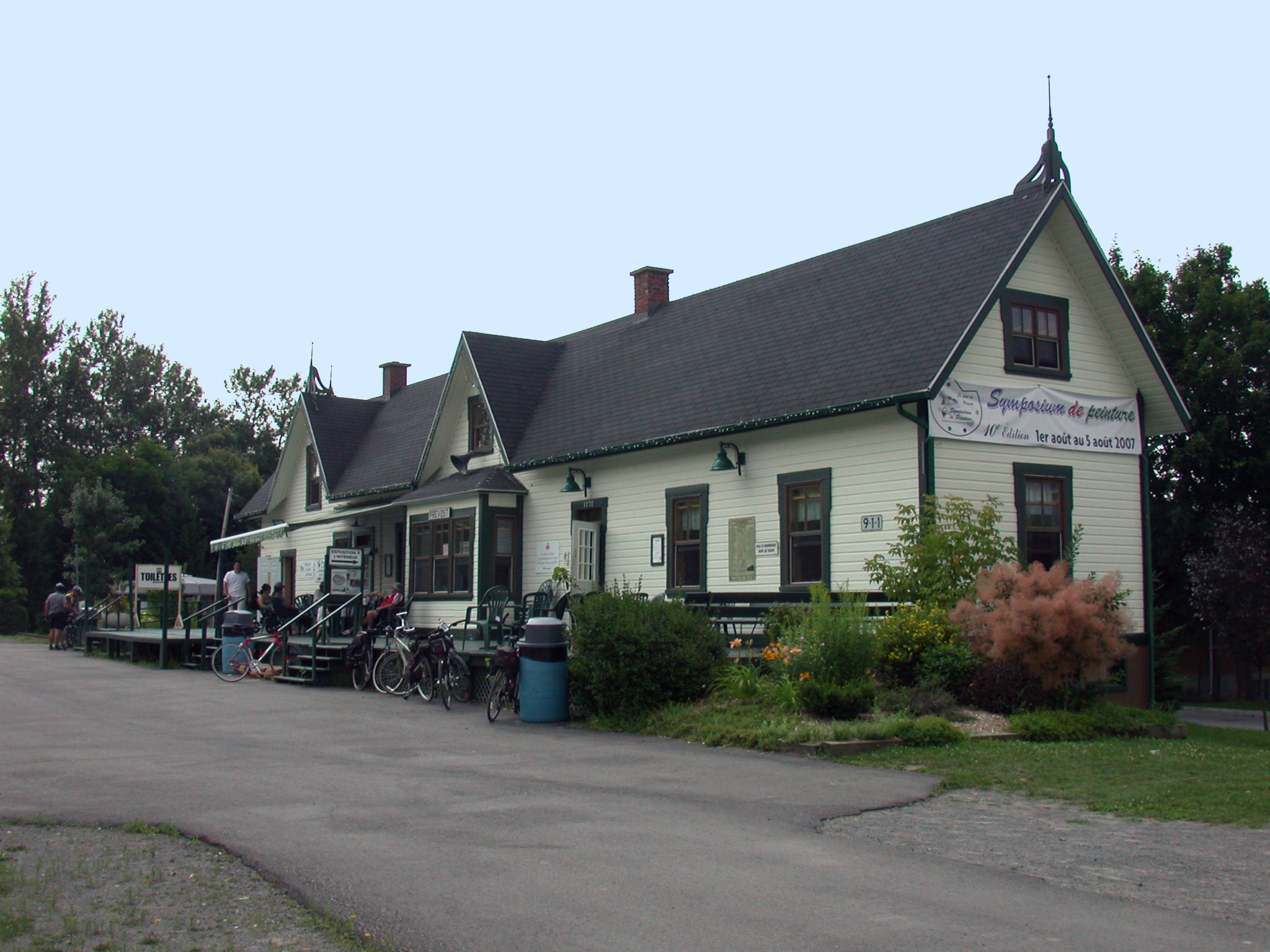
The former train station in Prévost along the trail.

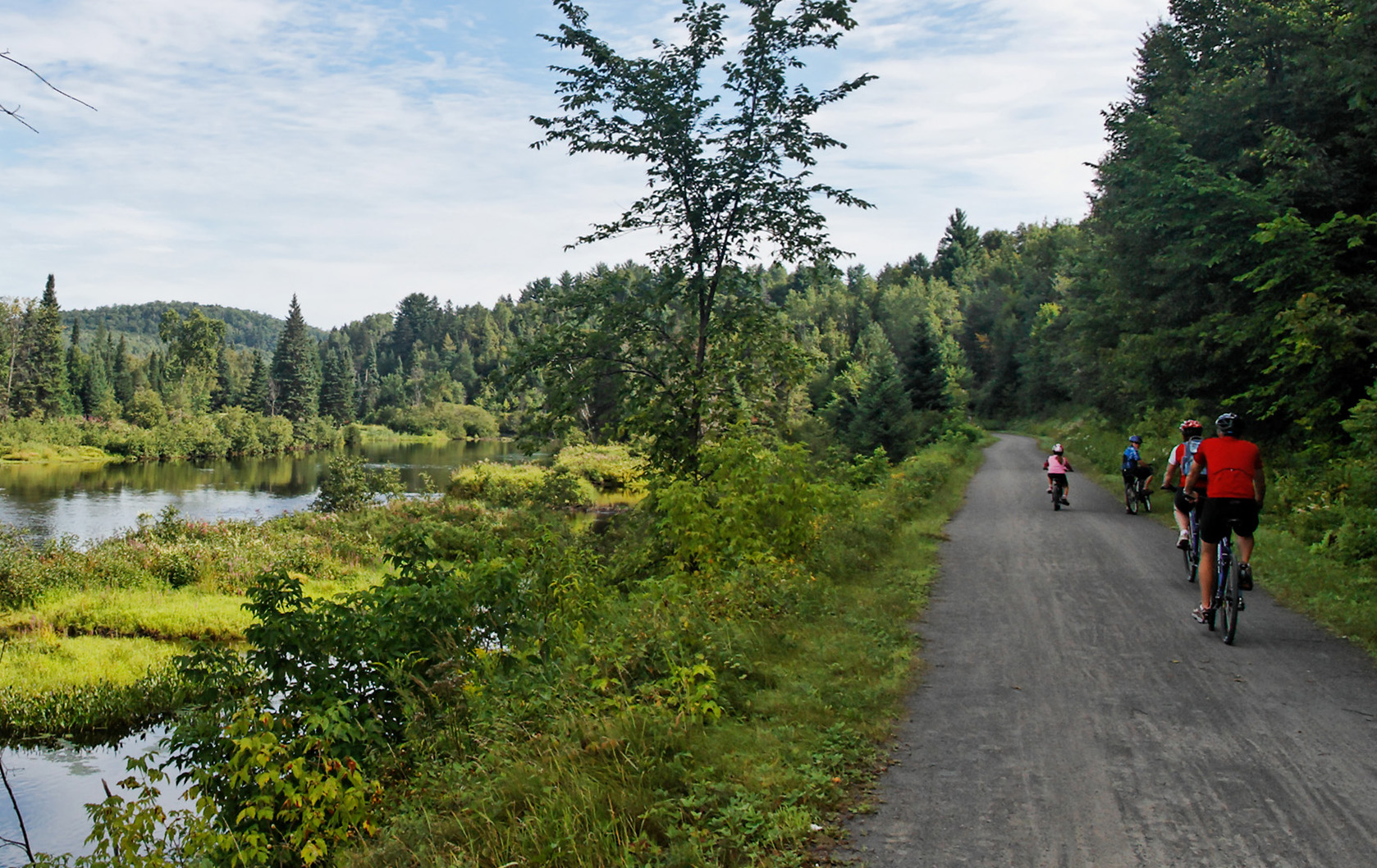
Along the trail

The Parc Linéaire Le P'tit Train du Nord (French pronunciation: [paʁk lineɛʁ lə p(ə)ti tʁɛ̃ dy nɔʁ]) is a multiuse recreational rail trail located in Quebec, Canada. It runs through the Rivière du Nord valley for 200 kilometres (124 miles) between Saint-Jérôme and Mont-Laurier, and is used for biking, cross-country skiing and hiking.

It originally was a railway line operated by Canadian Pacific Railway which operated it at a continuous financial loss since its construction in the 1890s. During the 1990s, it was dismantled to make way for a recreational multi-use trail except for the portion between Montréal and Saint-Jérôme which is still in service as the Saint-Jérôme line. Prior to decommissioning, passenger traffic on this line was so scarce that it gave way to the humorous and intricately philosophical and poetic song by Félix Leclerc, "Le train du nord".

Le P'tit Train du Nord linear park is a regional recreational and touristic asset for the Laurentides region which offers its own residents access to high-quality transportation and leisure activities on the one hand as well as allowing for management of a major tourist attraction generating significant economic benefits for the region on the other.

== See also ==
- List of rail trails
- List of rail trails in Canada
