= Sentier NB Trail =

Hiking trail network in New Brunswick, Canada

- Length: 850 kilometres (530 mi)
- Location: New Brunswick, Canada
- Established: 1994
- Use: Hiking, biking, equestrianism, cross-country skiing, snowshoeing
- Difficulty: Variable
- Season: All seasons
- Surface: Variable

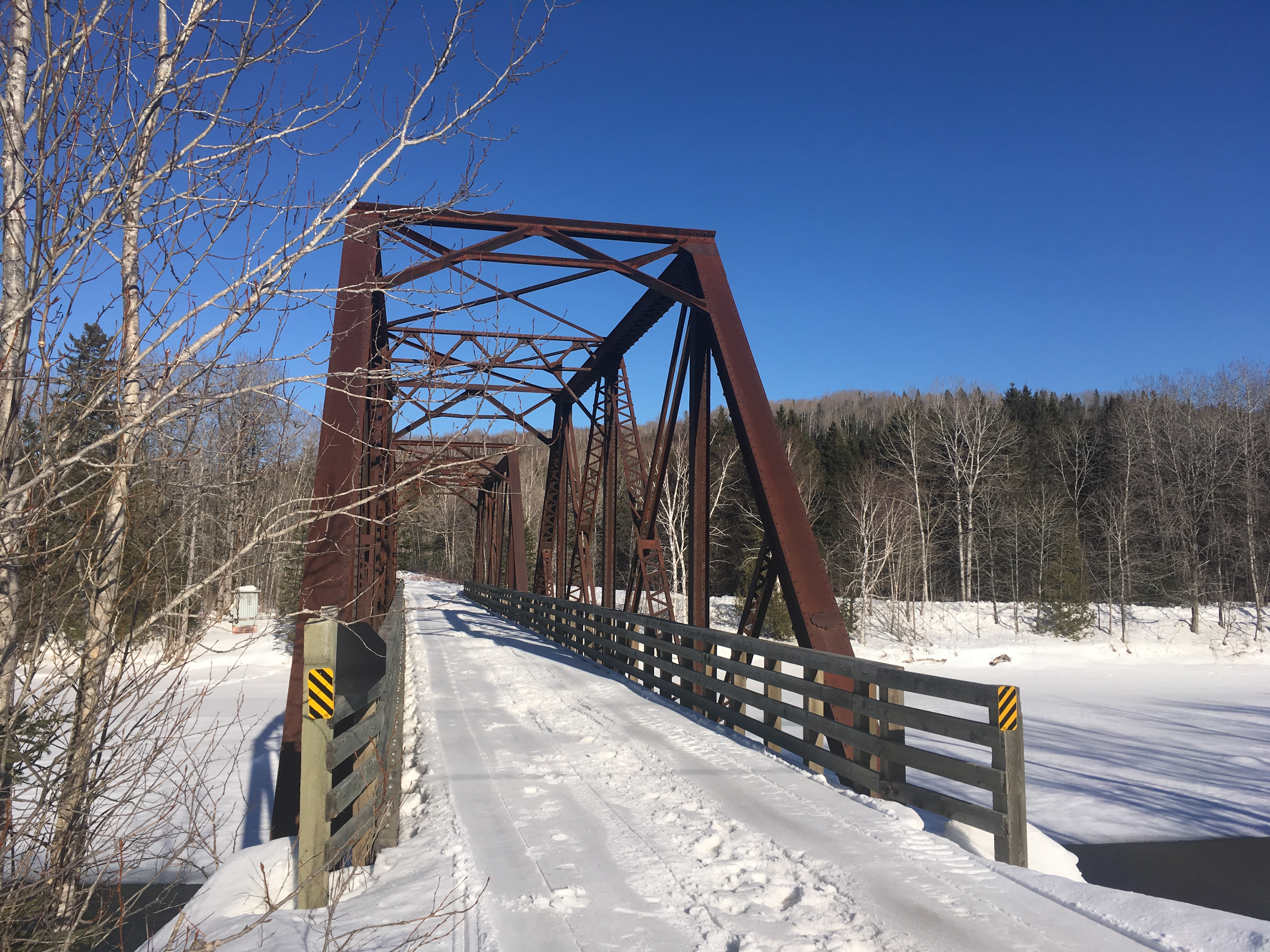
The Rail Trail Bridge in Upsalquitch. It is a part of the International Appalachian Trail, which in New Brunswick, is part of the NB Trail System. During the winter, the bridge is used by snowmobilers.

The Sentier NB Trail is a network of hiking trails in New Brunswick, Canada built on abandoned railways. The trails are mostly closed to motorized vehicles. The network is operated by the New Brunswick Trails Council, a non-profit organization. Some portions of the trail are also part of the Trans Canada Trail.
