= Pan Am Path =

Multi-use hiking and cycling path in Toronto, Canada

The Pan Am Path is a multi-use path that connects trails in the Greater Toronto Area as part of the legacy of the 2015 Pan American Games and the 2015 Parapan American Games. The path is over 80 kilometres (50 mi) in length, connecting Toronto neighbourhoods.

== History ==
On July 3, 2013, the city of Toronto's executive committee recommended the path as a legacy project. On July 18, 2013, in a 37–1 vote, Toronto City Council committed to create a continuous trail from Brampton to Rouge River. The original Pan Am Path strategy was to assist the Bikeway Trails Implementation Plan approved by Council on June 6, 2012, by accelerating the creation of an east–west connection across the city.

The first section of Pan Am Path, near Cruickshank Park, was completed on June 21, 2014. Updates on the current East Don build by the TRCA can be found here and upgrading of the Highland Creek Section here.

Six of the seven founding members of the Friends of the Pan Am Path group came from CivicAction's DiverseCity Fellows program: Brent Chamberlain, Caitlin McClung, James Gen Meers, Jonathan Asmis, Salim Rachid, and Tanzeel Merchant. Devon Ostrom, a curator, artist and advocate with a history of creating projects in Toronto collaborated with the group on this initiative. As a co-founder, Devon sketched out the original concept, named the project and was Lead Curator from 2012 to 2017. Documentation of art works, maps and continued trail construction updates can be found at an archive site here.

== Route ==
The Pan Am Path follows existing trails in Toronto and includes plans for new trail connections to complete the continuous route from Brampton to Pickering. Starting from the west near the Claireville Reservoir, the trail follows the Humber Valley Trail southward along the Humber River to Lake Ontario. From there, the trail turns eastward and follows the Martin Goodman Trail through downtown Toronto. A new trail connection will be constructed to connect to the Athletes' Village near the Distillery District and connecting to the Lower Don Valley Trail. The Path then follows the Don River north-east to Taylor-Massey Creek. Another new trail will be constructed along the eastern branch of the Don River, where the Path will connect to the Gatineau Hydro Corridor eastward through Scarborough. Another new trail will connect the Path to the Highland Creek Trail, following the Highland Creek back to Lake Ontario, where the Waterfront Trail completes the Path into Pickering.

Prior to the start of the Games in 2015, a temporary route was completed using marked on-street connections in places where the new trail connections had not yet been completed.

The Pan Am Path, particularly in the Rexdale area, currently features stations along the path for passersby to try rope climbing and chin-ups.
