= Scotch Lake, Nova Scotia =

Community in Nova Scotia, Canada

Coordinates: 46°11′2.15″N 60°22′1.66″W

Scotch Lake in Nova Scotia

Scotch Lake is a community in the Canadian province of Nova Scotia, located in the Cape Breton Regional Municipality on Cape Breton Island.
