= Big Salmon =

Big Salmon may refer to:

- Big Salmon Lake (Ontario), in Frontenac Provincial Park
- Big Salmon Range, in the Yukon, Canada

== See also ==
- Big Salmon River (disambiguation)
