= Eastern Great Lakes and Hudson Lowlands (ecoregion) =

Ecoregion in the United States

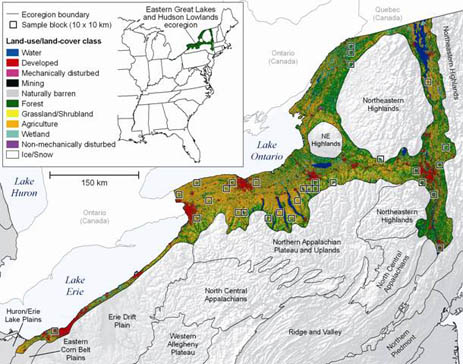
The Eastern Great Lakes and Hudson Lowlands Ecoregion within the United States of America.

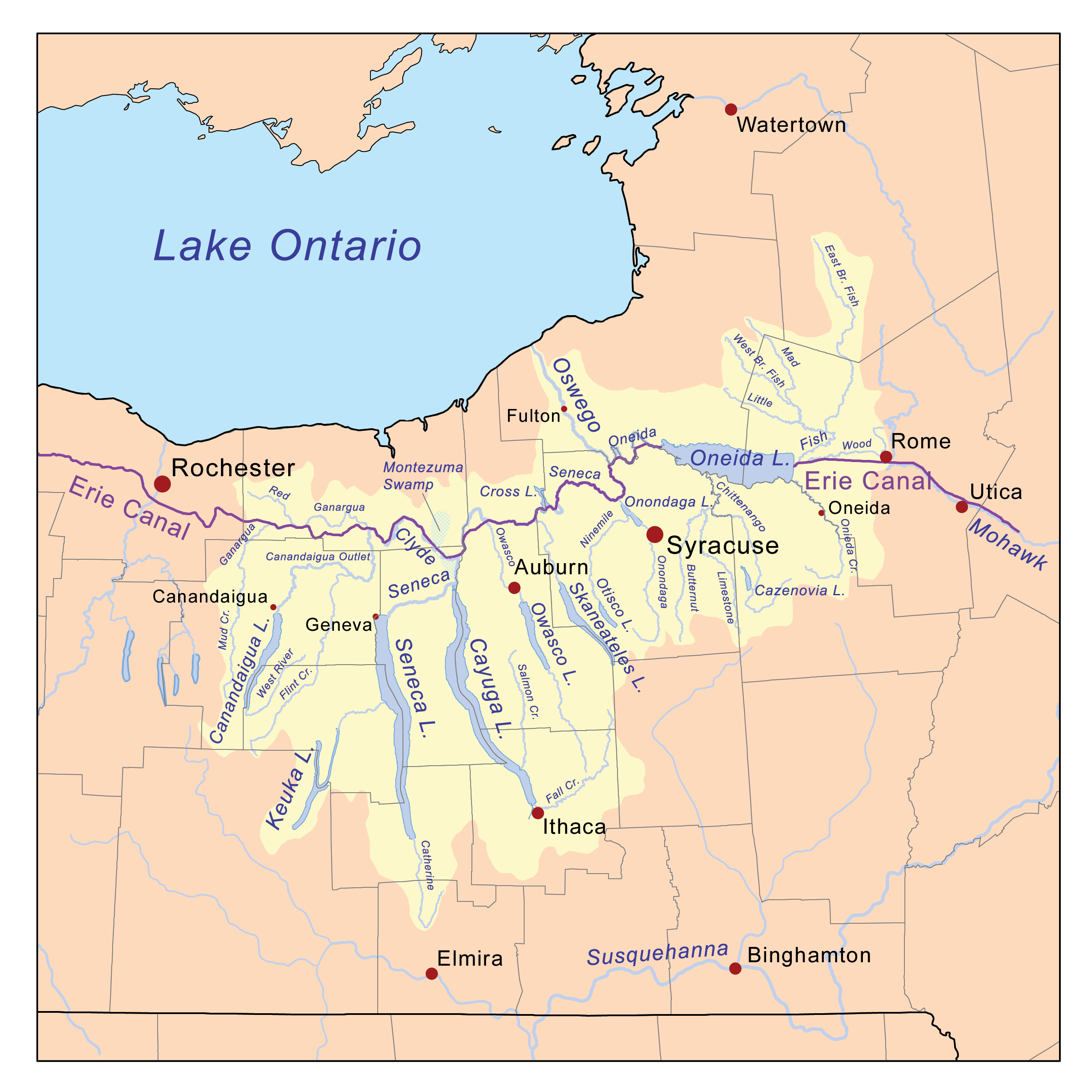
The Oswego River drains from the Finger Lakes north into Lake Ontario, while the Erie Canal provides a link from Albany to Buffalo.

The Eastern Great Lakes and Hudson Lowlands region extends along the south shores of Lake Erie and Lake Ontario and the St. Lawrence River to Lake Champlain, and south down the Hudson River. It is primarily within the state of New York, with smaller portions in Vermont, Pennsylvania, and Ohio. In the north it meets the Mixedwood Plains Ecozone of Canada in eastern Ontario and southern Quebec. It is mostly temperate deciduous forest and agricultural land.

It is one of the 104 Level III ecoregions that occur within the United States, and one of the 35 that comprise the Eastern Temperate Forest Level 1 Ecoregion. This classification system was developed by the United States Environmental Protection Agency.

== Description ==
This region was glaciated during the last ice age, and contains prominent glacial features including till and drumlins, as well as the valleys containing the Finger Lakes. Part of the area was covered by Glacial Lake Iroquois, while regions further to the east were flooded under the Champlain Sea. At one point during the melting of the glaciers, the Great Lakes drained down the Hudson River to the Atlantic Ocean.

== Natural history ==
This area is mostly temperate deciduous forest, dominated by trees including maple, beech and oak. Unlike forests further to the north, southern tree species such as hickory also occur (see Bitternut hickory and Shagbark hickory). Many other plant and animal species reach their northern limits in this ecoregion. A few more examples follow. The wetland plant, arrow arum (Peltandra virginica) reaches the St. Lawrence River and the Richelieu River. The bog turtle (Clemmys muhlenbergii) reaches the southern shores of Lake Ontario, while the eastern box turtle reaches the southern shores of Lake Erie. Along the shores of the lakes and rivers, there are significant areas of wetland, principally marshes and swamps. Some of the many significant natural areas include El Dorado Beach Preserve on Lake Ontario, the Chaumont Barrens alvar grassland, and the Rome Sand Plains.

Large areas of this forest have been cleared for agriculture, particularly dairy farms and row crops. The presence of the Great Lakes moderates the climate, but increases snowfall. Major cities in this region include Cleveland, Erie, Buffalo, Rochester, Syracuse and Albany.

== Ecoregion classification ==
There can be some problems with understanding the naming of this ecological region, since the Canadian government has its own classification system of ecozones, which can have different names. In this case, the Mixedwood Plains occur on the Canadian side of the border while the Eastern Great Lakes and Hudson Lowlands occur on the American side.

Hence, the Commission for Environmental Cooperation has worked toward giving each ecological region of North America a consistent name. In the CEC system, this ecoregion is named the Eastern Great Lakes and Hudson Lowlands, and is identified as region 8.1.1. In the west it meets ecoregion 8.1.2, the Lake Erie Lowland. In the east it meets 5.3.1, the North Appalachian and Atlantic Maritime Highlands.

In northern New York, there are two high altitude areas, one being the Adirondacks, that are colder and so fall within ecoregion 5.3.1. In addition the World Wildlife Fund developed its own classification system, in which much of this region is called the Eastern Great Lakes lowland forests.

== Images ==
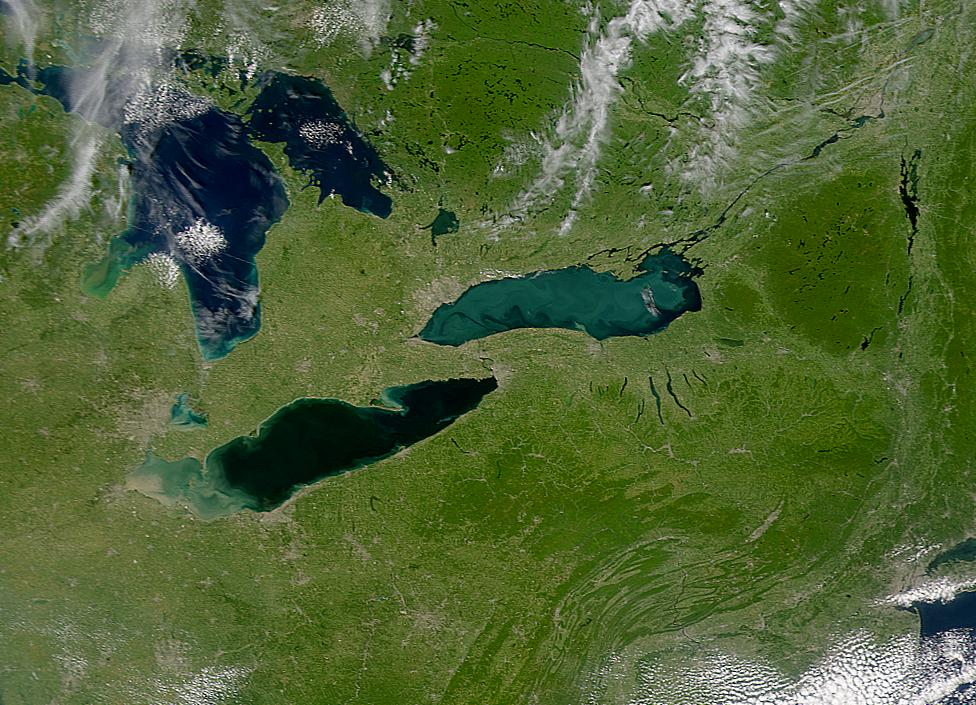
Lake Ontario and the Eastern Great Lakes and Hudson Lowlands from a satellite. Note dark green of Adirondack forests to right.

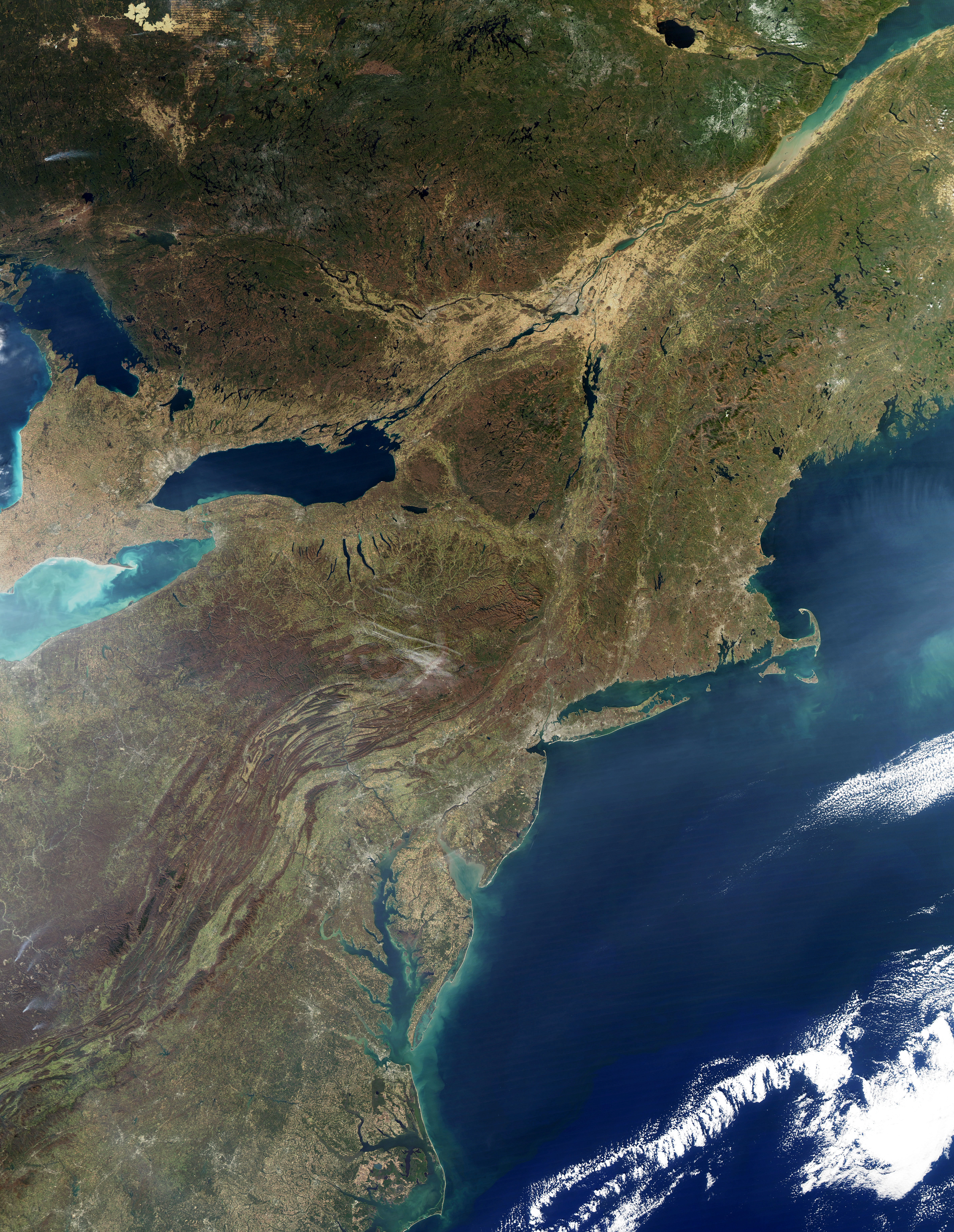
Satellite image of the region during late autumn.

This relief map shows the lowlands in the centre of this ecoregion, and the Mohawk Valley linking to the Hudson River.

Current route of the Erie Canal.

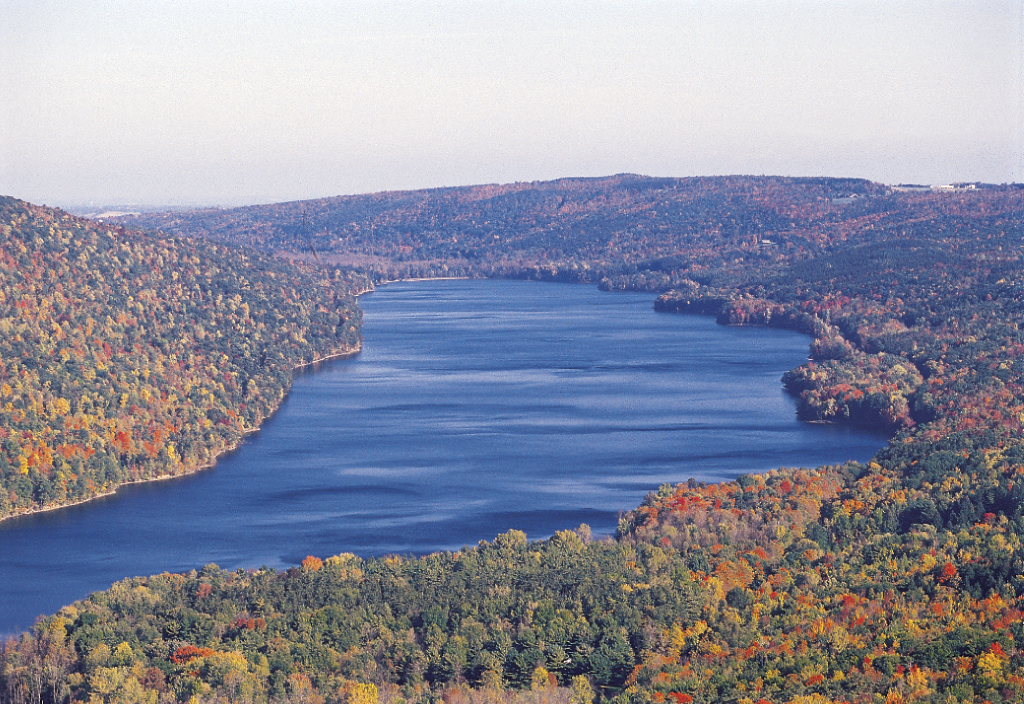
Canadice Lake is one of the Finger Lakes. It is surrounded by the Hemlock-Canadice State Forest.
