= RKY Camp =

Summer camp and outdoor centre near Kingston, Ontario

- RKY Camp waterfront on Eagle Lake

- Location within Ontario
- Type: Year-Round Camp
- Location: Parham, Ontario
- Coordinates: 44°40′8.5722″N 76°42′39.3336″W
- Opened: 1929
- Open: All year

RKY Camp is a non-profit organization and summer camp, accredited by the Ontario Camping Association, in Parham, Ontario, Canada, north of Kingston, Ontario. Operating since 1929 on Eagle Lake, RKY Camp was founded by The Rotary Club, Kiwanis International, and the YMCA of Kingston, making up the abbreviation 'R.K.Y.'. RKY Camp ran as an all-boys camp until 1969. The camp provides outdoor education and camping opportunities to people of all backgrounds, including integrated summer camping for children and young adults with disabilities through a combined effort with Reach for the Rainbow. RKY Camp provides financial assistance, or "camperships" to ensure any youth has an opportunity to attend.

== History ==
From 1925–1928, Camp Koch-pur-wani was run for two-week sessions each summer on the site of the current camp. During this time, the camp temporarily operated free of charge, and the organizers decided that the land was suitable for a permanent facility. The YMCA, working with the Kingston Work Board and the County of Frontenac Work Board, approached The Rotary Club and Kiwanis Club, proposing to purchase the land. In December 1928, both clubs had shown interest in the purchase. On July 3, 1930, The Rotary Club and Kiwanis Club purchased the 25 acres of land for $925.00, while the YMCA supplied approximately $500.00 of equipment. Two representatives from each organization sat on a managing committee to oversee camp operations. RKY Camp is the only camp in the province with joint ownership by three service clubs.

In 1930 the managing committee decided that the Rotary and Kiwanis Clubs would assist in the payment of camp fees for boys who would otherwise be unable to attend. This led to the campership program which is still offered today. The subsidization allowed camper fees to be at a fair $6.00 per week. Although at the time the camp primarily used tents, the first cabin was built in 1929. A large dining hall was built in 1931 that also acted as an indoor meeting place. The waterfront was also set up in 1931 with a swimming dock, a boating dock, and an 18-foot, 3-level diving tower. In the 1940s, the camp underwent major construction, including the building of many new cabins, a crafts shop, a camp hospital, and new camp headquarters. A motorboat, sailboat, and many rowboats and canoes were stationed at the waterfront.

Swimming and boating were popular program activities, which included waterfront safety and diving lessons. In the craft shop, boys learned leather working and woodworking, making camp furniture, paddles, and moccasins. Professors from Queen's University in Kingston would go to RKY Camp to facilitate hikes and conduct lessons in nature study, including astronomy and geology. Activities such as softball, track and field, public speaking, drama, and, in the very early years, bible study were also offered.

During the first few years of World War II, the camp continued to operate despite difficulties in finding competent staff. However, in 1943, the camp was forced to close as there was nobody to work in the kitchen. In 1946 the camp re-opened and summer programming resumed. After re-opening, the camp faced a rapid increase in registration and an expansion to the dining hall was required in 1951, and a second time in 1954. Three new cabins were built in 1952, followed by two more in 1957.

In 2010 a five-year refurbishment project was started to replace cabins from the 1930s. The traditional end-of-session ceremony has been a memorable program since RKY Camp started, and continues today in what is now called "Elements". The ceremony originally consisted of traditional native dances and music, local native history, and authentic legends. The program used to end with a friendship fire that was tended to all night. Campers would cut and peel a stick, sign their names on it and burn the end of it in the friendship fire to seal the bonds they made at camp.

== Summer camping ==
Summer camping is split into four twelve-day sessions. Five summer programs are offered each session: one-week youth camp (ages 7–11), youth camp (ages 7–12), senior camp (ages 13–15), leaders-in-training or LIT (ages 15–16), and counsellors-in-training or CIT (ages 16–17). Campers are placed into cabins of the same age group, each cabin maintaining a 5:1 camper-staff ratio, usually with 10 campers and two staff. Every cabin participates in an out trip, the length of which is based on their age group. One-week youth campers go on an overnight trip conducted on site, youth campers go on an overnight trip on one of the islands on Eagle Lake, while senior campers, LITs, and CITs go on out trip for multiple nights, conducted in Frontenac Provincial Park or Algonquin Provincial Park. Campers may choose their activities, participate in core programming area activities, and participate in camp wide games. There are seven core programming areas: Swimming, Boating, Adventure, Nature, Arts and Crafts, Campcraft, and Music. Each camper may choose two program areas, which they attend every day. In addition to daily program areas, campers have a chance to develop their skills and explore the other program areas during Free-Choice Times, cabin group activities, interest groups, and "Learn-How-To's".

== Outdoor centre ==
RKY Camp runs a year-long outdoor centre including "school group bookings, outdoor education, leadership development, environmental education, curriculum-based learning, custom programs, family camps, women's weekends, retreats/rentals, March Break camp, PA Day camp, weddings, and out trips and guiding". The RKY Camp Outdoor Centre offers similar programming as in the summer season, but also offers season-specific activities, such as snowshoeing, cross-country skiing, tobogganing, and ice fishing.

== Duke of Edinburgh's Award ==
RKY Camp, in collaboration with the Ontario chapter of The Duke of Edinburgh's Award, organizes canoeing, hiking, and winter camping trips for participants aged 14 to 25. Participants completing the Bronze, Silver, or Gold levels of the award can use these trips toward their practice and adventurous journeys while developing the skills required for the program. The trips are led by RKY Camp's outdoor educators.
