= Charleston Lake Provincial Park =

Provincial park in Ontario, Canada

- IUCN category II (national park)
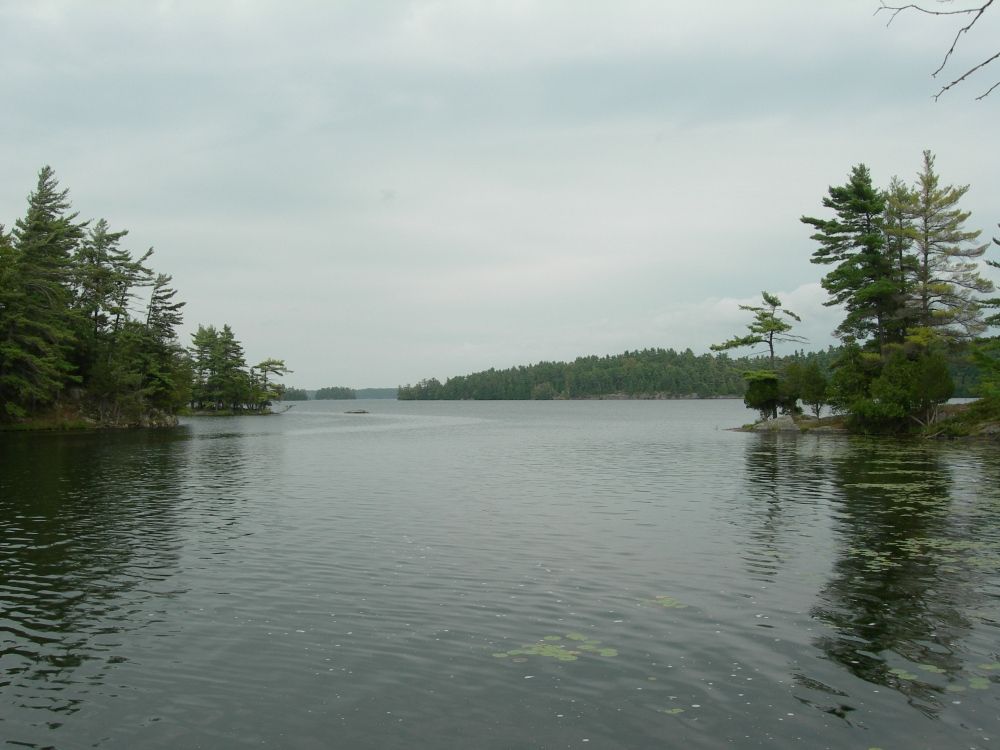
- Charleston Lake from Slim Bay bridge

- Location within Southern Ontario
- Interactive map of Charleston Lake Provincial Park
- Location: Outlet, Ontario, Canada
- Nearest city: Brockville, Ontario
- Coordinates: 44°30′10″N 76°02′26″W
- Area: 23.53 km^{2} (9.08 sq mi)
- Established: 1972
- Visitors: 119,000 (in 2022)
- Governing body: Ontario Parks
- Website: www.ontarioparks.ca/park/charlestonlake

Charleston Lake Provincial Park is located on Charleston Lake near Athens, Ontario, Canada, in the township of Leeds and the Thousand Islands.

The park occupies 23.53 square kilometres (9.08 sq mi) in the Frontenac Axis region, a southern extension of the Canadian Shield. The park's forests and animal life, therefore, include species normally found further north, yet the southern climate allows species more typical for the southern latitude to co-exist with the northern species. The park includes hiking trails, swimming areas and campgrounds.

Four yurts are located in the Shady Ridge Campground. These yurts are not heated and do not have electricity. A rustic cabin is accessible by water and has lights and a small fridge which are solar-powered.

The lake includes a number of islands and has an irregular shoreline which makes it an interesting location for canoeing and kayaking. Blue Mountain, elevation 194 m (636 ft), is also within the park. The summit was the highest point of the former Leeds County, Ontario. The trail to Blue Mountain has two access points, by water from Huckleberry Hollow, and by land from the intersection of Warburton and Blue Mountain Roads.

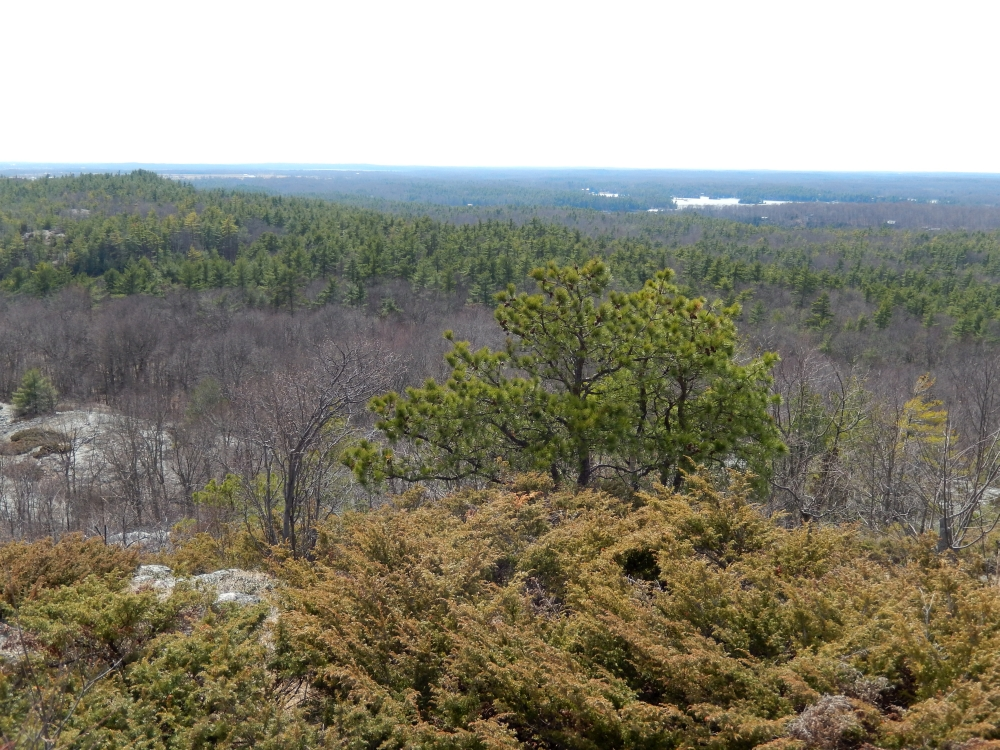
View southwest from Blue Mountain to Long Mountain and Charleston Lake

Blue Mountain can be reached via Blue Mountain Road from Highway #2. Hikers have permission to cross private land and a well-marked trail leads to the summit with a panoramic 360° view. The trek requires approximately 2 to 2.5 hours on foot or 1.5 hours on bike, although cyclists must carry their bikes in many places where hard granite jets out of the earth below which forms the mountain. A compass may be useful for inexperienced hikers.

This area was the site of a re-introduction program for the peregrine falcon. The park also provides habitat for the rare and harmless black rat snake, which is the largest snake found in Canada.
