= Mixedwood Plains Ecozone =

Ecosystem in Ontario and Quebec

Mixedwood Plains
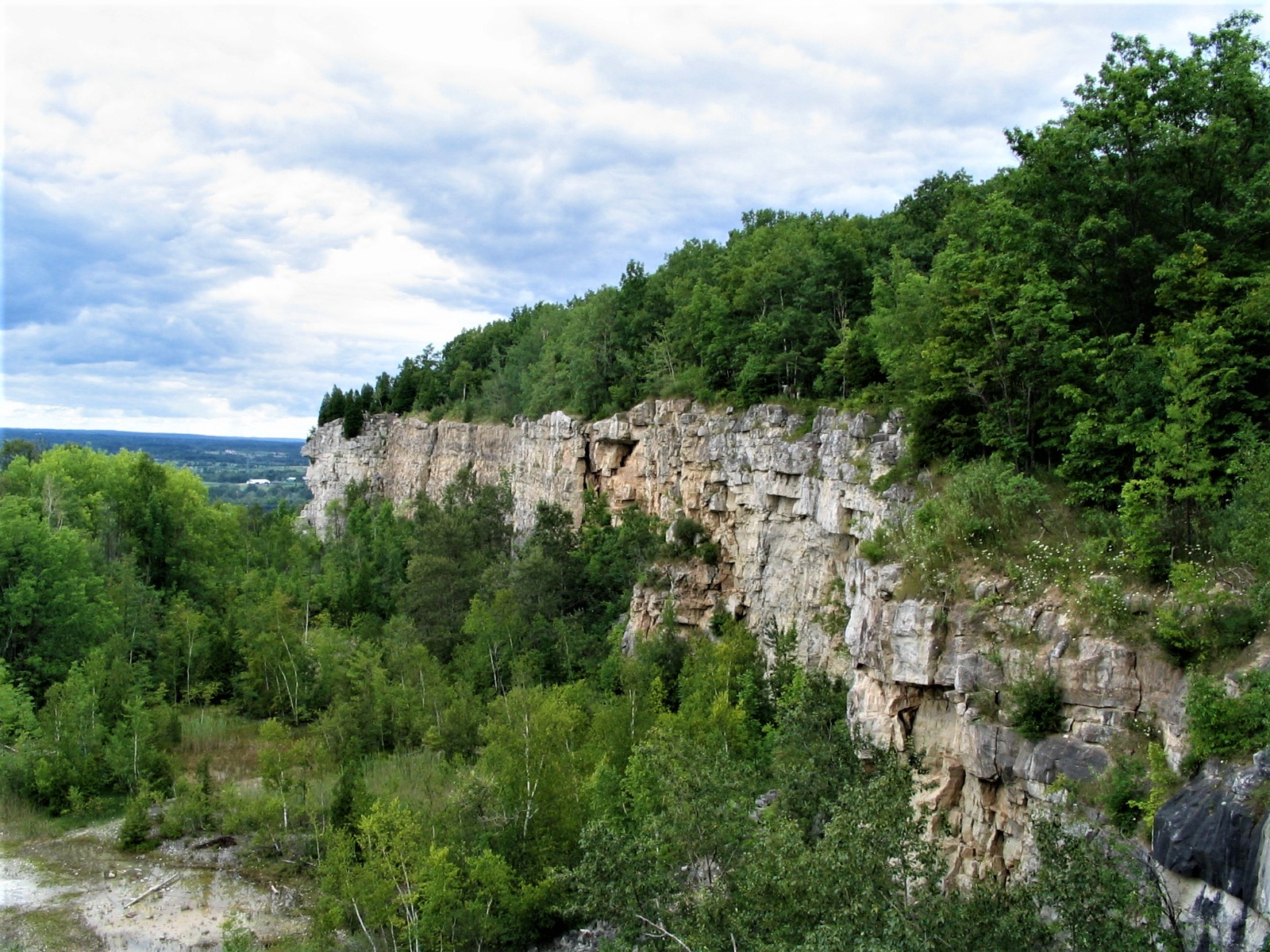
- A representative stand of deciduous forest typical of this ecoregion

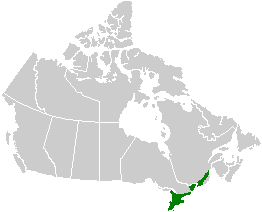

Ecology
- Borders: Atlantic Maritime; Boreal Shield

Geography
- Area: 168,204 km^{2} (64,944 mi^{2})
- Country: Canada
- Provinces: Ontario; Quebec
- Climate type: Humid continental (hot summer in some areas)

The Mixedwood Plains Ecozone is the Canadian ecozone with the most southern extent, covering all of southwestern Ontario, and parts of central and northeastern Ontario and southern Quebec along the Saint Lawrence River. It was originally dominated by temperate deciduous forest growing mostly on limestone covered by glacial till. It is the smallest ecozone in Canada, but it includes the country's most productive industrial and commercial region, and is home to nearly half of Canada's population, including its two largest cities, Toronto, Ontario and Montreal, Quebec. Hence, little of the original forest cover remains, making protection of the remaining forests a high conservation priority. This ecozone includes two regions described by J.S. Rowe in his classic Forest Regions of Canada: the entire Deciduous Forest Region, and the southern portions of the Great Lakes-St. Lawrence Forest Region. In the province of Ontario, the Ontario Ministry of Natural Resources maps this area as Site Regions 6E and 7E.

The United States uses a different terminology; the corresponding Level I ecoregion of the United States Environmental Protection Agency system is the Eastern Temperate Forest ecoregion. To deal with the differences in names between Canada and the United States, the Commission for Environmental Cooperation has produced a continental atlas. In this atlas, the Mixed Wood Plains is a Level II Ecoregion 8.1, which includes the above areas within Canada, as well as adjoining parts of the United States.

== Geography ==
The Mixedwood Plains stretch along the Quebec City-Windsor corridor. At its western end, it encompasses all of Southwestern Ontario, and is bounded by three Great Lakes and their connecting waterways. To its north is Lake Huron, and to the south Lake Erie. Further east, it has boundaries with Lake Ontario to the south and Lake Simcoe to the north, before continuing east along a narrow strip of the Saint Lawrence River coast toward Quebec. It covers approximately 9% of the total surface of Canada and has a geographic area of 175,963 km^{2}.

Most of the ecozone is underlain by Paleozoic rock, mostly limestone, covered with various deposits of glacial till including moraines, drumlins and old glacial lake bottoms. The eastern areas were flooded by the Champlain Sea. One prominent rock feature is the Niagara Escarpment, which bifurcates the region from Niagara Falls to the northern tip of the Bruce Peninsula, then extends to Manitoulin Island. Another is the Frontenac Axis, an exposure of Canadian shield rocks that extends south to the St. Lawrence River near Kingston, creating the Thousand Islands. In south-central Ontario, the ecologically important and politically sensitive Oak Ridges Moraine is a major feature.

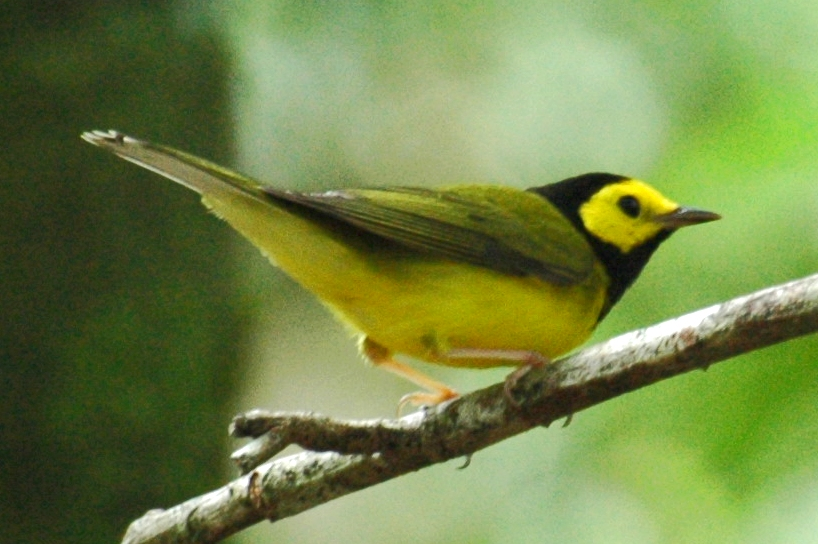
The hooded warbler nests in the southern forests of the mixedwood plains ecozone.

Owing to its southern location, it initially had a high natural biological diversity. For example, the Lake Erie Plains region has the highest tree diversity in Canada, with species such as tulip tree, cucumber tree, pawpaw, black gum, sassafrass and black oak. American chestnut was common in this region before the arrival of chestnut blight, though it is now very rare. The area also has a high diversity of songbirds, reptiles and amphibians.

Some of the most fertile soil in Canada is located in this ecozone, in which the Holland Marsh has come to be known as "Ontario's vegetable basket", and the Niagara Peninsula is the most productive wine region in the country.

This ecozone is subdivided into four ecoregions: St.Lawrence Lowlands 132, Frontenac Axis 133, Manitoulin-Lake Simcoe 134 and the Lake Erie Lowland 135. The Lake Erie Lowland corresponds roughly to Site Region 7E, and to the more general term "Carolinian Forest."

=== Ecoprovinces ===
This ecozone can be further subdivided into two ecoprovinces:

- Great Lakes-St. Lawrence Lowlands
- Huron-Erie Plains

== Climate ==
The climate of the Mixedwood Plains is characterized by warm to hot summers and cool winters. The Great Lakes and Saint Lawrence River have a significant moderating effect in this ecozone, which is in a major North American storm belt. Warm air fronts from the Gulf of Mexico and US south- and mid-west often collide with cold polar air masses, providing abundant precipitation in some areas. Annually, the region receives between 720 and 1,000 mm of precipitation. Most areas receive close to 150 cm of snowfall but snowbelt areas can receive well over 300 cm during a typical winter.

Summers average about 23 °C in July in the southwestern end of the zone, to 18 °C in the higher part of the north. Winters are much milder in the southwest along the Lake Erie shore, with a mean January temperature of -3 °C, whereas mean lows are -12 °C in the northeast. Some lakeshore areas have over 200 frost-free days per year.

Because of the relatively mild climate for Canada, the region has become an important and productive agricultural area. Agriculture has been the primary cause of deforestation in the ecozone; it was once covered entirely by forests. The resultant loss of natural habitat has caused a decline in the populations of many native species, and now over half of the Species at Risk in Canada are found in this zone.

== Ecology ==
=== Forests ===
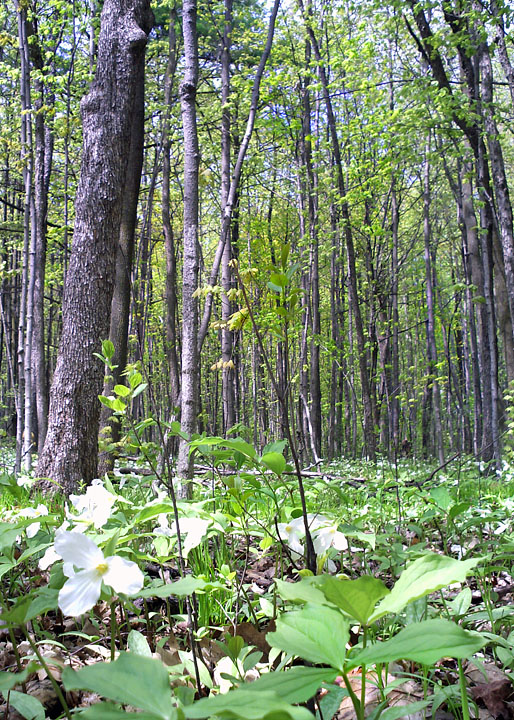
A representative stand of deciduous forest near Peterborough with white trilliums in flower

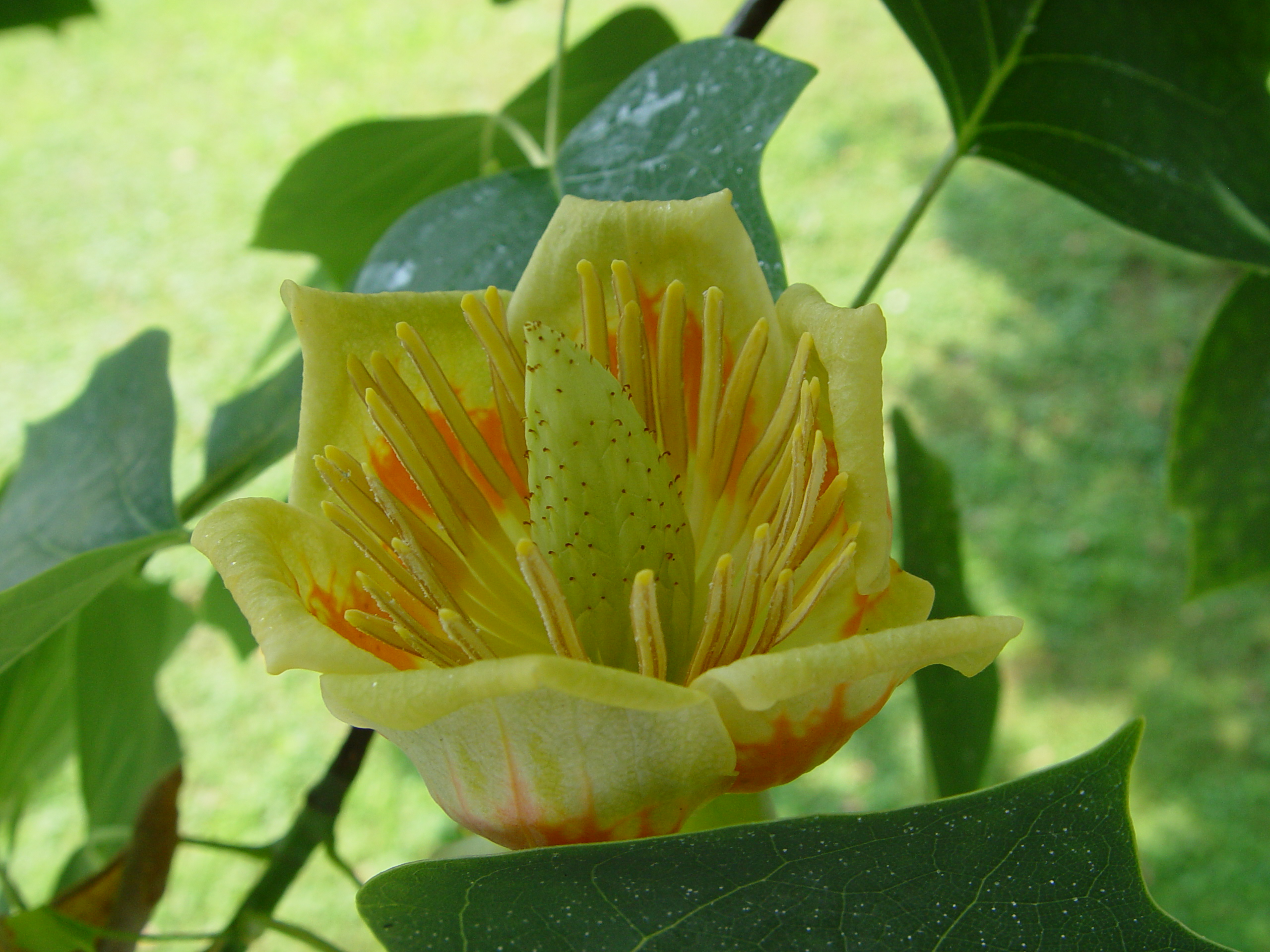
The tulip tree grows in the southern forests of the mixedwood plains ecozone.

The forests are a part of the temperate deciduous forest that extends from Florida north to eastern Canada. The mixed plains ecozone has the highest plant diversity in Canada, with the Lake Erie lowland having tree species that occur nowhere else in Canada. Within Canada, these forest types are often referred to as the 'Carolinian zone' owing to the many southern plants and animals that reach their northern limits here. Clearing for agriculture and urbanization have reduced natural forest cover to less than ten percent. An overview of the flora and fauna of this distinctive region is available in The Natural Treasures of Carolinian Canada. A few of the many examples of southern species found here include the hooded warbler, king rail, prothonotary warbler, blue-gray gnatcatcher, American badger, opossum, and eastern spiny softshell turtle. Past work has identified 38 critical natural areas, and an initiative known as The Big Picture aims to restore natural corridors as part of a natural heritage system. Some of the critical core areas in this region include Point Pelee, Long Point, Rondeau Park, Skunk's Misery, Backus Woods and Willoughby Marsh.

=== Wetlands ===
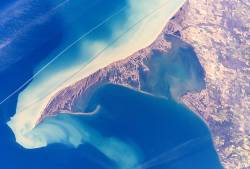
Long Point extends into Lake Erie. It supports a rich flora and fauna typical of the Lake Erie Lowland.

There is a rich diversity of wetlands in this ecozone owing to the presence of the Great Lakes and two major rivers, the Ottawa River and the St. Lawrence River. The wetlands on the Great Lakes are influenced by the slope of the shoreline, the type of substrate, exposure to waves, and the natural water level changes that characterize these lakes. Some nationally significant wetlands include Point Pelee National Park and Long Point, both on Lake Erie, and Presqu'ile Provincial Park on Lake Ontario. The wetlands of the St. Lawrence and Ottawa River have a diverse array of vegetation types as well, although these have been damaged by the construction of power dams and locks for shipping. Vast numbers of waterbirds use these wetlands during migration, and they provide important habitat for fish.

== Human population ==
The Mixedwood Plains is the most populated ecozone in Canada, with about half of the country's total population. Of the top 25 most populous cities in Canada, 13 are found in this ecozone, including the two largest, Toronto with 6.1 million inhabitants and Montreal with 4.2 million inhabitants, as well as the country's capital city, Ottawa.

== Conservation ==
Human settlement has had a major impact on this ecoregion. A majority of the forested land has been cleared for agriculture, and a majority of the wetlands have been drained or filled. Hence, the remaining forests and wetlands are important for conservation of wild species, and for the ecological services provided to humans by forests and wetlands.

=== Protected areas ===
A number of protected areas have been established to protect representative and/or significant portions of this ecozone. Those designated by the federal government include Bruce Peninsula National Park, Point Pelee National Park, and Thousand Islands National Park. Those designated by provincial governments include Presqu'ile Provincial Park.

About 1.51% of the ecozone is protected, the smallest percentage amongst the terrestrial ecozones in Canada.
