= Front of Yonge =

- Township (lower-tier)
- Township of Front of Yonge
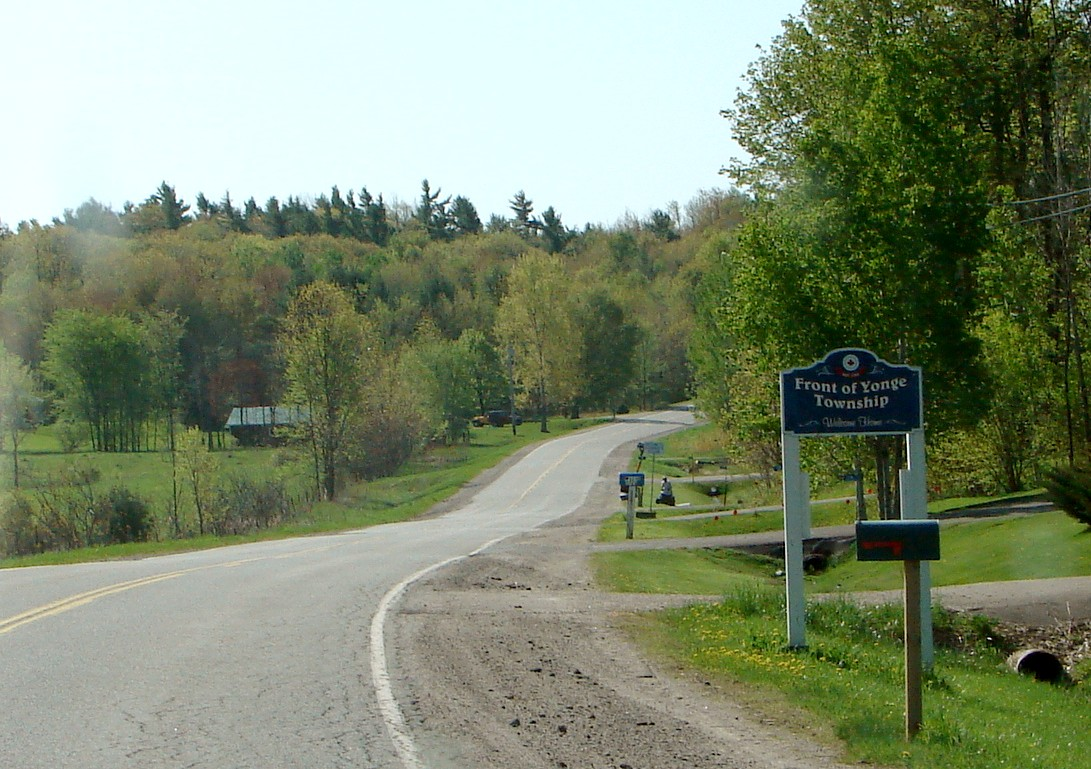

- Location within United Counties of Leeds and Grenville Location within Southern Ontario
- Coordinates: 44°32′N 75°52′W
- Country: Canada
- Province: Ontario
- County: Leeds and Grenville
- Settled: 1780s
- Incorporated: 1905

Government
  - Mayor: Roger Haley
  - Fed. riding: Leeds—Grenville—Thousand Islands and Rideau Lakes
  - Prov. riding: Leeds—Grenville—Thousand Islands and Rideau Lakes

Area
  - Land: 125.25 km^{2} (48.36 sq mi)

Population (2021)
  - Total: 2,595
  - Density: 20.7/km^{2} (54/sq mi)
- Time zone: UTC-5 (EST)
  - Summer (DST): UTC-4 (EDT)
- Postal Code: K0E
- Area codes: 613, 343
- Website: mallorytown.ca

Front of Yonge is a township in the United Counties of Leeds and Grenville in Ontario, Canada.

It is the location of the Thousand Islands National Park Visitor Centre and Brown's Bay Beach, as well as a number of private campgrounds, the Jones Creek walking trail system, and the 1000 Islands Waterfront Trail’s walking/bike path which runs from just beyond the township's eastern boundary to neighbouring towns. The predominance of the Canadian Shield produces scenic and diverse landscapes which include exposed rock formations and heavy tree cover, as well as wide fields and beaches.

== Geography ==
Front of Yonge is located along the St. Lawrence River in the Thousand Islands region. Part of the Frontenac Arch Biosphere Reserve, Front of Yonge can be found between the larger towns of Brockville to the east, and Gananoque to the west. Approximately 135 kilometres (84 mi) away from Ottawa and 325 kilometres (202 mi) from Toronto, Front of Yonge is within driving distance to many of the larger cities of Ontario.

=== Communities ===
The township comprises the communities of Ballycanoe, Caintown, Mallorytown, Mallorytown Landing, McIntosh Mills, Trevelyan and Yonge Mills. The township administrative offices are located in Mallorytown.

==== Mallorytown ====
The largest settlement area of the township is the community of Mallorytown. It was founded by Nathaniel Mallory, a United Empire Loyalist who came to the area at Mallorytown Landing in 1784, and later moved inland in search of better farmland.

This village is the site of Canada's first glassworks factory, which began in 1839, and closed in 1840. Only a few pieces of Mallorytown glass still exist, the most famous being the ‘Mallorytown Pitcher' which is on display at the Royal Ontario Museum. A reproduction of this piece is currently on display at the Mallory Coach House, an 1850s stone home which has been renovated and is open to visitors on weekends during the spring and summer months.

==== Mallorytown Landing ====
Mallorytown Landing is situated on the St. Lawrence River and is the location of the Visitor Centre for the Thousand Islands National Park, which comprises several ecologically important mainland properties and more than twenty islands between Kingston and Brockville. Established in 1904 as the first Canadian national park east of the Rockies, it is also the smallest of the national parks.

During the War of 1812, Mallorytown Landing was a port for ships moving supplies and a blockhouse was built on nearby Chimney Island to defend the British supply line on the river (which is a National Historic Site of Canada today).

== History ==
Front of Yonge is named for the Right Honourable Sir George Yonge, a British Secretary during the War of 1812. The area was settled by many United Empire Loyalists after the American Revolutionary War, who also participated in the War of 1812. Officially designated as Front of Yonge in 1859, this township, along with the nearby Front of Escott and Front of Leeds and Lansdowne, were the only three municipalities with "Front" in their names because they all front the St. Lawrence River. Years later, both Escott and Leeds and Lansdowne were assimilated into the municipality of Leeds and the Thousand Islands. That left Front of Yonge the only township in Ontario with "Front" in its name.

In 1853, the Township of Yonge and Escott was divided into the Township of Front of Yonge and Escott and the Township of Rear of Yonge and Escott. A few years later in 1859, the Township of Front of Yonge and Escott was divided into the Township of Front of Yonge and the Township of Front of Escott. But in December 1888, these two townships were merged again into one municipality, named Township of Front of Yonge and Escott. In 1905, once more the united township was divided and the Township of Front of Yonge is separately incorporated.

== Demographics ==
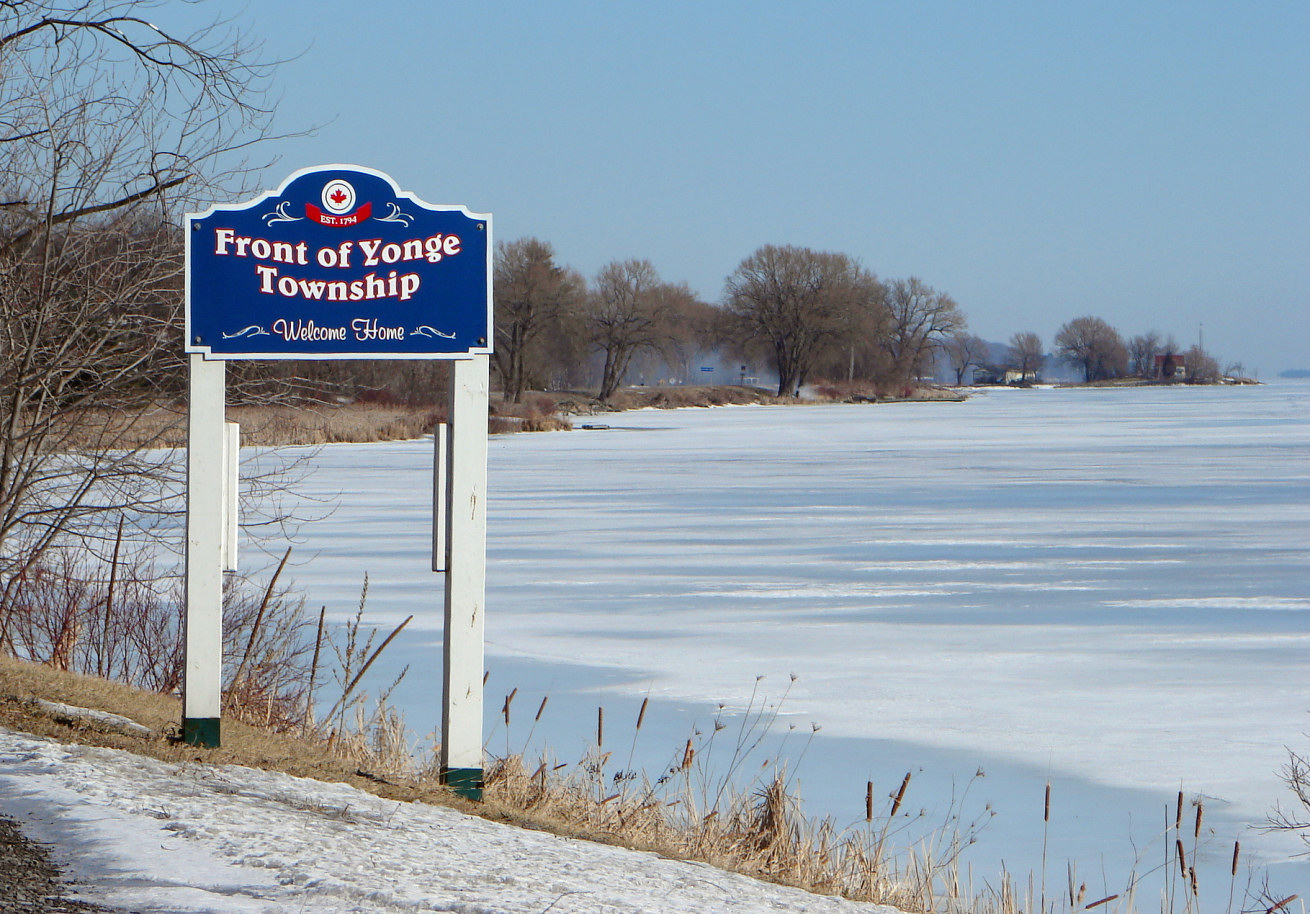
Waterfront along the Saint Lawrence River

In the 2021 Census of Population conducted by Statistics Canada, Front of Yonge had a population of 2,595 living in 1,073 of its 1,208 total private dwellings, a change of −0.3% from its 2016 population of 2,602. With a land area of 125.25 km^{2} (48.36 sq mi), it had a population density of 20.7/km^{2} (53.7/sq mi) in 2021.

Historical census populations – Front of Yonge

Year	Pop.	±%
1931	1,274	—
1941	1,188	−6.8%
1951	1,238	+4.2%
1956	1,366	+10.3%
1961	1,497	+9.6%
1966	1,500	+0.2%

Year	Pop.	±%
1971	1,576	+5.1%
1976	1,792	+13.7%
1981	1,973	+10.1%
1986	2,169	+9.9%
1991	2,357	+8.7%
1996	2,530	+7.3%

Year	Pop.	±%
2001	2,639	+4.3%
2006	2,803	+6.2%
2011	2,752	−1.8%
2016	2,680	−2.6%
2021	2,595	−3.2%

Population counts are not adjusted for boundary changes.
Source: Statistics Canada

Mother tongue (2021):

- English as first language: 93.6%
- French as first language: 2.1%
- English and French as first language: 0.4%
- Other as first language: 3.5%

== See also ==
- List of townships in Ontario
