= Great Lakes–St. Lawrence Lowlands =

Physiographic region in eastern Canada

The Great Lakes–St. Lawrence Lowlands, or simply St. Lawrence Lowlands, is a physiographic region of Eastern Canada that comprises a section of southern Ontario bounded on the north by the Canadian Shield and by three of the Great Lakes — Lake Huron, Lake Erie and Lake Ontario — and extends along the St. Lawrence River to the Strait of Belle Isle and the Atlantic Ocean. The lowlands comprise three sub-regions that were created by intrusions from adjacent physiographic regions — the West Lowland, Central Lowland and East Lowland. The West Lowland includes the Niagara Escarpment, extending from the Niagara River to the Bruce Peninsula and Manitoulin Island. The Central Lowland stretches between the Ottawa River and the St. Lawrence River. The East Lowland includes Anticosti Island, Îles de Mingan, and extends to the Strait of Belle Isle.

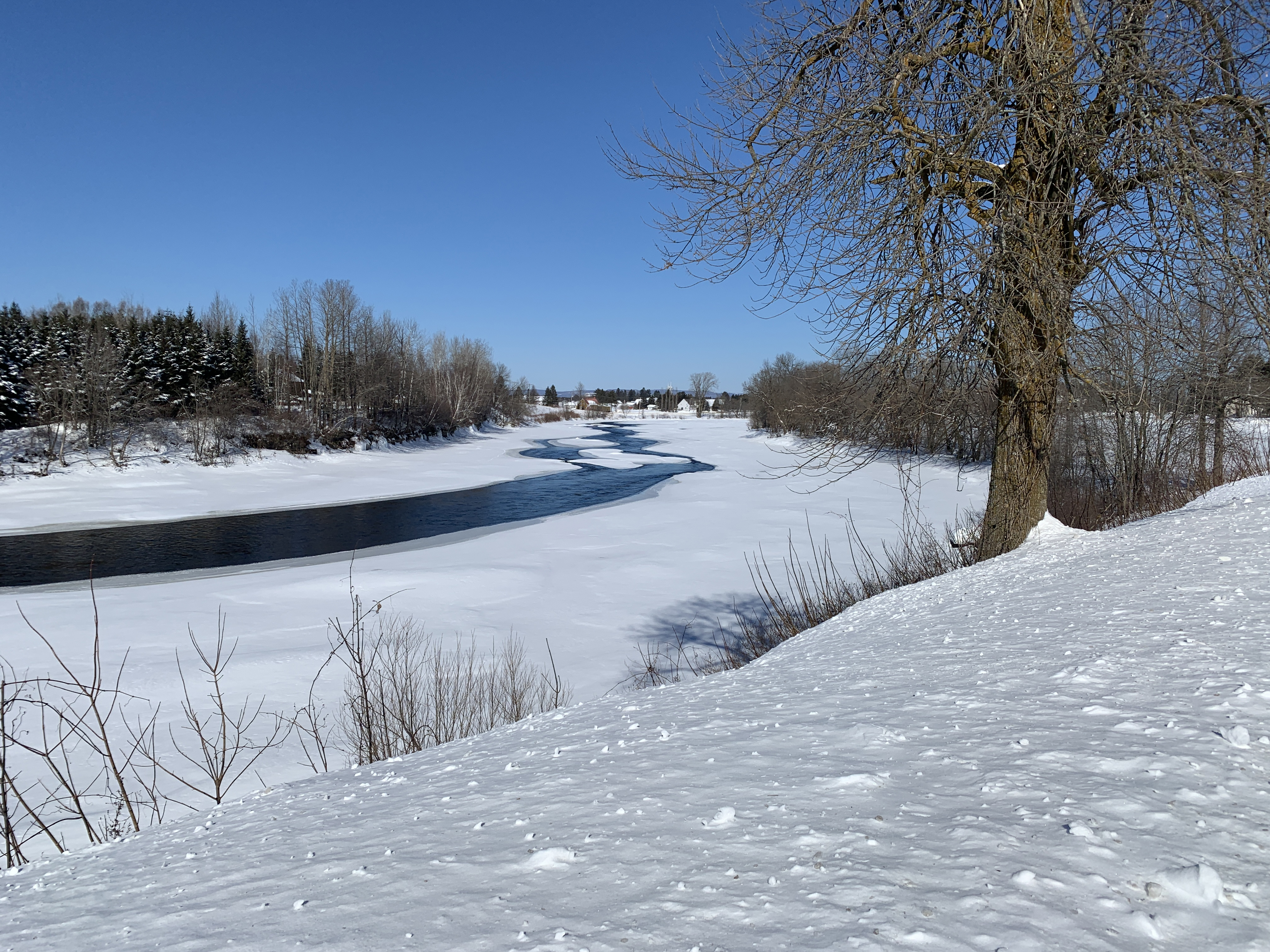
St. Lawrence Lowlands, Sainte-Anne river, rang du Rapide-Sud, Saint-Casimir

The St. Lawrence Lowlands is one of the most densely populated, prosperous and productive regions in Canada. Major urban areas include Toronto, Montreal, Ottawa-Gatineau and Quebec City.

The St. Lawrence Lowlands was covered by surficial deposits left by ice sheets following the Pleistocene glaciations. It is the smallest of Canada's seven physiographic regions — the others being the Arctic Lands, the Cordillera, the Interior Plains, the Canadian Shield, the Hudson Bay Lowlands and the Appalachian Uplands — distinguished by topography and geology. The boundaries of the area largely reflect that of the Mixedwood Plains Ecozone, the smallest of Canada's fifteen terrestrial ecozones.

== Geography ==
The Great Lakes-St. Lawrence Lowlands includes a section of southern Ontario bounded on the north by the Canadian Shield and by three of the Great Lakes—Lake Huron, Lake Erie, and Lake Ontario, and extends along the Saint Lawrence River to the Strait of Belle Isle The St. Lawrence Lowlands ecoregion includes the Ottawa River and the St. Lawrence River lowlands. The Frontenac Axis, a wedge of the Canadian Shield that protruded southwards into the northern United States, separates the St. Lawrence Lowlands in Quebec from southern Ontario. In the north the Lowlands are bounded by the Laurentian Highlands and to the south by the Eastern Quebec Uplands. The Geological Survey of Canada published an updated map in 2014 defining the boundaries of the Great Lakes-St. Lawrence Lowlands physiographic region.

=== Sub-regions ===
The Great Lakes-St. Lawrence's lowlands include three sub-regions.

==== West Lowland ====
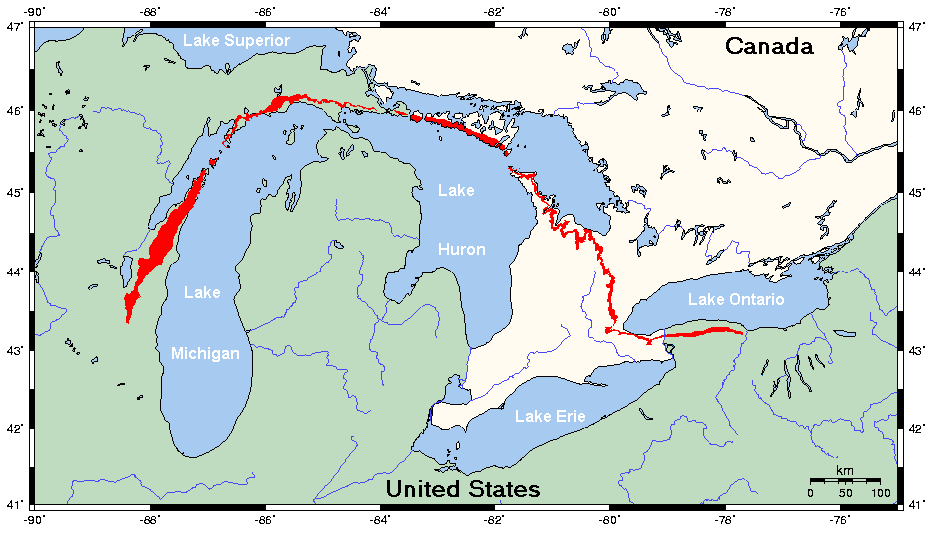
Niagara Escarpment (in red)

The southwest region of the Lowlands which is in southern Ontario and northern New York and Vermont is divided by the Niagara Escarpment, which extends northwest from the Niagara River to the Bruce Peninsula and Manitoulin Island. Most of the area which is east of the Niagara Escarpment—from Lake Ontario north to Georgian Bay—has low relief. The characteristic of this area, which was "entirely covered by glaciers during parts of the Pleistocene", are "lakes, poorly drained depressions, morainic hills, drumlins, eskers, outwash plains, and other glacial features." Soils in this area include "peat, muck, marl, clay, silt, sand, and gravel" (Note: The 1995 Ecological Stratification Working Group (ESWG)'s report builds on the Canada Committee on Ecological Land Classification (CCELC), created in 1976.) This subregion includes the Bruce Peninsula to the northwest and the Niagara Peninsula, which is the warmest and most intensely cultivated part of the ecozone.

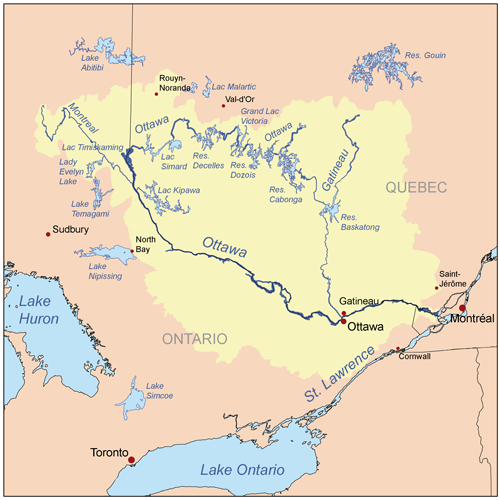

==== Central Lowland ====
The Central Lowland stretches between the Ottawa River and the Saint Lawrence River and extends to Québec city. Major cities include Trois-Rivières. The Lowlands include a small area on the north shore near Québec City. The St. Lawrence Lowlands are underlain by marine and lacustrine clays and bedrock outcrops of Paleozoic limestone. In the north it is bounded by the Laurentian Highlands.

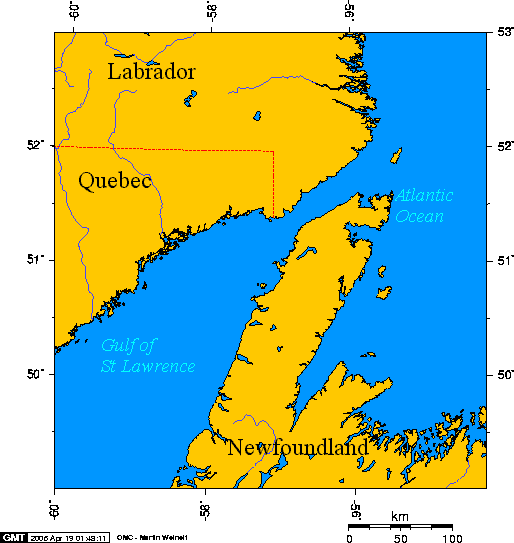

==== East Lowland ====
The East Lowland includes Anticosti Island, Îles de Mingan, the Strait of Belle Isle and the Newfoundland Coastal Lowland. To the south it is bordered by the Eastern Quebec Uplands.

== Physiographic region ==
The Great Lakes-St. Lawrence Lowlands is listed as one of Canada's seven physiographic regions, which in turn have their own subregions and divisions—distinguished by topography and geology. This map shows the location of these physiographic regions, including their subregions and divisions. The other physiographic regions are the Canadian Shield, the Hudson Bay Lowland, the Arctic Lands, the Interior Plains, the Cordillera, and the Appalachian Uplands.

The region is "underlain by carbonate-rich" limestone Paleozoic sedimentary rock, The glacial till deposits formed moraines, drumlins and glacial lake bottoms.

== Topography ==
The landforms of the Great Lake – St. Lawrence Lowlands, with its rolling hills and slopes, were carved by glacial streams. Two of the most prominent geological features include the Niagara Escarpment and the Frontenac Axis. The Niagara Escarpment bifurcates the region from Niagara Falls to the northern tip of the Bruce Peninsula, then extends to Manitoulin Island. The Frontenac Axis, is an exposure of Canadian shield rocks that extends south to the St. Lawrence River near Kingston, creating the Thousand Islands.

=== Geology ===
Peninsular Ontario lowlands are separated from the lowlands of the lower St. Lawrence at the Thousand Islands by the Frontenac Axis, where ancient granite of the Canadian Shield cross over and become the Adirondacks. The next notable pinching occurs at Quebec City, where again the Shield meets the shore. Anticosti Island and Newfoundland, both being islands, are separated by stretches of open saltwater.

Due to the presence of a deep fault line, this water eventually siphoned into the ocean. Thus, the primary defining historic feature of the lowlands is the presence of deep soils within the watershed and estuary of the St. Lawrence River. This feature occurs in more than one distinct Peninsular Ontario south and west of and the surrounding area, including the lower Ottawa Valley and St. Lawrence below the Thousand Islands, as far as Quebec City. A narrow ribbon of land along both shores of the lower St Lawrence Estuary, hemmed in on the north shore by the Canadian Shield and on the south which faces into the flow of the river, has accreted alluvial soils from the Great Lakes basin.

=== Glacial legacy ===
Huge glacial seas such as Lake Agassiz, and the Champlain Sea (in the east), and vast, continent-wide 2 kilometres thick ice sheets contributed to the formation of the region. The present form of Great Lakes–St. Lawrence basin developed about 7,000 years ago. It began to emerge from glacial sheets about 14,000 years ago.

== Ecozones and regions ==
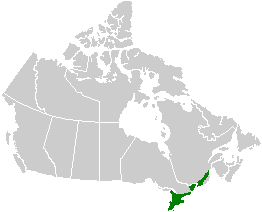
The Mixedwood Plains Ecozone in southern Canada has deciduous forests.

The extent of the Great Lakes-St. Lawrence Lowlands physiographic region, as defined by Geological Survey of Canada, differs from the boundaries of ecozones defined by the Canadian Council on Ecological Areas (CCEA) and the World Wildlife Fund (WWF), for example. Statistics Canada described the St. Lawrence Lowlands as a densely populated 41,770 km2 ecoregion in Quebec and Ontario, with the St. Lawrence River flowing through the middle and included cities such as Ottawa–Gatineau, Montréal, Trois-Rivières and Québec in this ecoregion. StatsCan said that, by 2006, 80 percent of the St. Lawrence Lowlands were covered by forests and cropland. The ecoregion produced 38.5 percent of Canada's total corn cropland, 22.6 percent of Canada's maple tree taps, 23.6 percent of the "Canadian pig population and 32.9 percent of Canadian dairy cows".

The Great Lakes–St. Lawrence Lowlands terrestrial region overlaps with Mixedwood Plains Ecozone, the smallest of Canada's fifteen terrestrial ecozones. (Note: The map on page 11 shows the 15 terrestrial ecozones as defined at that time by the CCEA as well as the much larger terrestrial ecozone to the north—the boreal shield and the Atlantic Maritime terrestrial ecozone, which lies to the south and east.) The Canadian Shield the largest of the ecozones overlaps with the boreal forest terrestrial ecozone in the Mixedwood Plains Ecozone. The triangular area between three of the Great Lakes—Lake Huron, Lake Erie, and Lake Ontario and the area along the St. Lawrence River are part of the Mixedwood Plains Ecozone.

Because of its "rich fertile soils", relatively mild climate, and extensive waterways, the Mixedwood Plains Ecozone, is one of the "most productive ecozones in Canada". The ecozone extends along the St. Lawrence shoreline to Quebec City. It represents the "most populous and prosperous terrestrial ecozone". and is home to nearly half of Canada's population, including its two largest cities, Toronto, Ontario and Montreal, Quebec.

The World Wildlife Fund (WWF) describes the Great Lakes-St. Lawrence River lowlands as the Eastern Great Lakes lowland forests ecoregion. The lowland forest area stretches across the lowlands of the American states of New York and Vermont, and the Canadian provinces of Ontario and Quebec. The New York and Vermont lowlands surround the Adirondack Mountains. The Quebec lowlands are along the St. Lawrence River. The lowlands in southern Ontario stretch between Lake Ontario and the Georgian Bay/Lake Huron region.

== Hydrographic system ==
The Great Lakes – St. Lawrence hydrographic system—with a surface area of 1.6 million km2—is the third largest in North America and one of the largest in the world. Three aquifers of the St. Maurice Delta Complex in the Central St. Lawrence Lowlands provide drinking water for Trois-Rivières and most of the other municipalities in the region.

The premiers of the provinces of Quebec and Ontario and eight Great Lakes governors from Indiana, Michigan, Minnesota, New York, Ohio, Pennsylvania, and Wisconsin signed the Great Lakes–Saint Lawrence River Basin Sustainable Water Resources Agreement on December 13, 2005, which came into force in 2015. It is a good faith agreement detailing the management and use of the Great Lakes Basin's water supply. It was signed on December 13, 2005. It succeeds and builds on the Great Lakes Charter signed in 1985 and its Annex signed in 2001.

== Economy ==
Even though the Great Lakes-St. Lawrence Lowlands is the smallest landform region in Canada, Southern Ontario and Quebec have a dense population and are home to about 50 percent of the population of Canada. Historically, the lower Great Lakes-St. Lawrence River Valley region attracted European immigrants and United Empire Loyalists with its "diversified resource base". Eventually, the area became the site of the "political consolidation of Upper Canada (Ontario) and Lower Canada (Quebec) forming the core of the Canadian Confederation in 1867". Southern Ontario's Golden Horseshoe and the St. Lawrence lowlands formed Canada's industrial and manufacturing heartland. Stretching from Windsor, Ontario, along the shores of Lake Ontario to Quebec City, the formed a "densely populated urban ribbon at a length of some 1000 km and a width of 100-300 km".

== Resources ==
The Great Lakes-St. Lawrence region of Canada provides drinking water to over 8.5 million Canadians. The region holds "largest freshwater system in the world" representing over 80 per cent of freshwater in North America. In 2014, the economy of the Lowlands was valued at about $CDN 5.8 trillion. About 50 percent of Canada's industrial capacity is in this region. With the abundance of water and fertile soil, the Lowlands account for about 25 percent of "Canada's agricultural capacity." With its dense population and an economy valued at about $CDN 5.8 trillion in 2014, industries in the Lowlands provide about 50 million jobs.

There is Utica shale, the stratigraphical unit of Upper Ordovician age occupies about 16,000 square kilometres in the Central Lowlands subregion of the St. Lawrence Lowlands (SLL) in the administrative regions of Montérégie, Centre-du-Québec and Chaudière-Appalaches.

== Wildlife and waterfowl ==
There are about 3,500 species of animals and plants in the Lowlands. Characteristic wildlife includes the black bear, grey wolf, coyote, beaver, snowshoe hare, white-tailed deer, lynx, moose, and otter. Birds include waterfowl, warblers, blue birds, red-winged black birds, eagles, and hawks.

== Urban communities ==
Major cities in the Lowlands include "Quebec City, Toronto, Montreal, Trois-Rivières, Saint-Hyacinthe, Cornwall, Brockville, Ottawa/Gatineau, and Pembroke."

== First Nations ==
For thousands of years, Indigenous peoples have been living along both sides of the Saint Lawrence River. The Great Lakes-St. Lawrence Lowlands was the traditional lands of the Mohawk—the most easterly tribe of the Iroquoian-speaking Haudenosaunee Confederacy, the Algonquian and Iroquoian peoples, and the Cree—one of the largest groups of First Nations in North America.

== See also ==
- Bostock, H.S. (2014), ""A" Series Map 1254A", Geological Survey of Canada, Physiographic regions of Canada, doi:10.4095/293408 This 2014 updated map shows the boundaries of the Great Lakes–St. Lawrence Lowlands physiographic region as defined by the Geological Survey of Canada.
- Eyles, Nick; Miall, Andrew (2007). Canada Rocks: The Geologic Journey. Markham, Ontario: Fitzhenry & Whiteside. p. 512. ISBN 978-1-55041-860-6.
- Bone, R. M. (2003). The regional geography of Canada. Don Mills, Ontario: Oxford University Press.
- Douglas, R.J.W. (Scientific Editor). 1972. Geology and Economic Minerals of Canada. Geological Survey of Canada.
- Franzi, David A; Rayburn, John A; Yansa, Catherine H; Knuepfer, Peter L K. "Late glacial water bodies in the Champlain and St. Lawrence Lowlands and their Paleoclimatic implications": 25.
- Geography of Canada
