= Frontenac Provincial Park =

Provincial park in Ontario, Canada

- IUCN category II (national park)
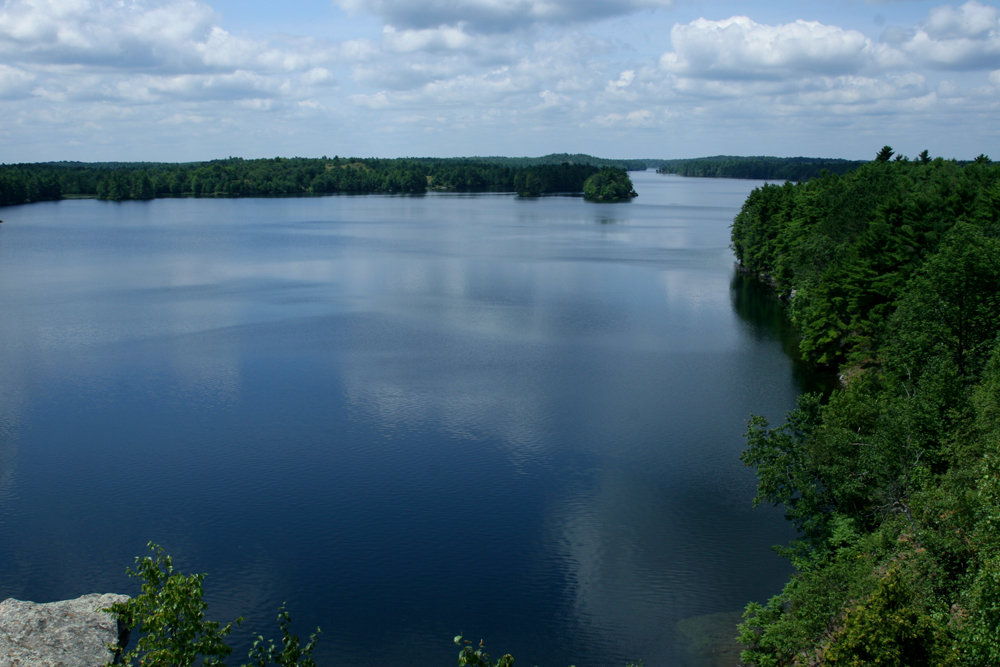
- View of Big Salmon Lake

- Location within Southern Ontario
- Interactive map of Frontenac Provincial Park
- Location: Frontenac County, Ontario, Canada
- Nearest city: Kingston, Ontario
- Coordinates: 44°32′N 76°29′W
- Area: 52.14 km^{2} (20.13 sq mi)
- Established: 1974
- Visitors: 26,682 (in 2022)
- Governing body: Ontario Parks
- Website: www.ontarioparks.com/park/frontenac

Frontenac Provincial Park is a provincial park located near the town of Sydenham, north of Kingston, Ontario, Canada. This 5,350 ha (13,200-acre) park is classified as a natural environment park, and lies on the Frontenac Axis, a topographic extension of the Canadian Shield connecting to the Adirondack Mountains. It features 22 lakes, over 700 species, and extensive areas of mixed forest, wetlands, and granite outcrops.

Located within the Frontenac Arch Biosphere Reserve and the Frontenac Forests Important Bird Area the region is regarded for its biodiversity. It is home to many species of ferns and orchids, some rare. There is also an abundance of fauna, including the American black bear, red fox, mink, northern river otter, white-tailed deer, porcupine, and fisher.

== History ==
Frontenac Provincial Park was established in 1974.

Before European settlement, indigenous peoples, mostly Algonquins, lived in the area. Several homesteads were established by European settlers in what is now park area, but the rocky landscape posed challenges for homesteading. Historically, the area supported forestry and mining industries for local communities.

== Recreation ==
=== Camping, hiking, and paddling ===
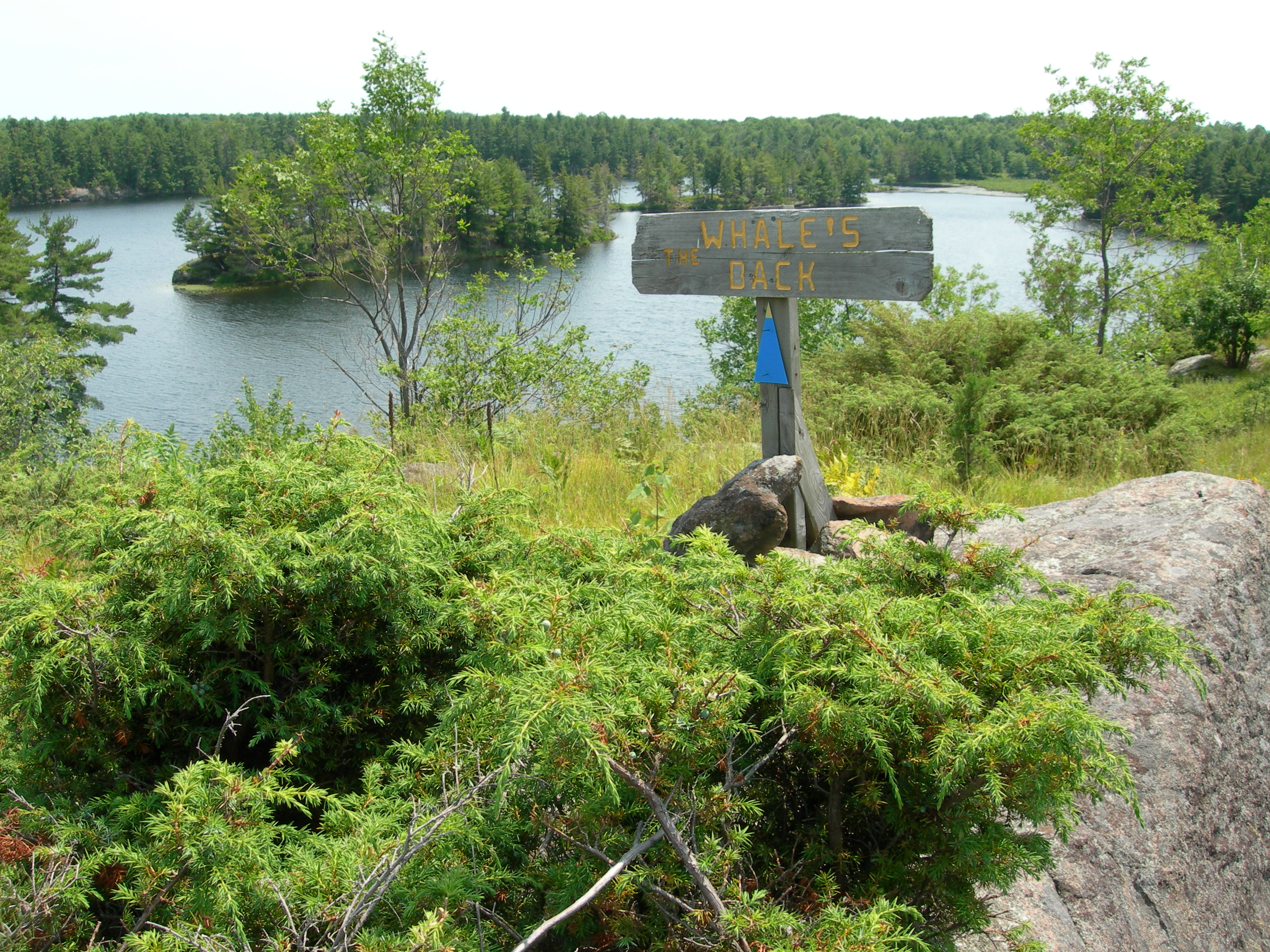
Whale's Back and Slide Lake

Frontenac has roughly 160 kilometres (99 mi) of hiking trails, 51 backcountry campsites (consisting of 48 clusters and 3 single sites), and many lakes for canoeing and kayaking.

- Arab Lake Gorge Trail is a short, 1.5-kilometre (0.93 mi) trail that traverses the Arab Lake Gorge.
- Doe Lake Trail is 3 kilometres (1.9 mi) in length. It goes from South Otter Lake to Doe Lake and back. A highlight of the trail is the abandoned Kemp Mine.
- Slide Lake Loop measures 21 kilometres (13 mi) in length and encircles Slide Lake and parts of Buck Lake. It is the longest loop in the park,
- The Rideau Trail runs through the southern portion of the park.

=== Education and events ===
Wilderness courses are offered to teach wilderness skills in a semi-wilderness setting. Common offerings include wilderness navigation skills, wilderness first aid and ORCA.

=== Fishing ===
Fishing is permitted within Frontenac Park year-round, and species include lake trout, largemouth and smallmouth bass, northern pike, black crappie, perch, and brook trout. Several lakes are stocked to offer winter ice fishing opportunities.

=== Winter activities ===
Frontenac remains open throughout winter, and offers trails for snowshoeing, cross-county and backcountry skiing, winter camping, and ice fishing.
