= Big Salmon Lake (Ontario) =

- Location within Ontario
- Location: Frontenac County, Ontario, Canada
- Coordinates: 44°32′24″N 76°29′51″W
- Type: lake

Big Salmon Lake is a lake in Frontenac Provincial Park in eastern Ontario. It lies in the Frontenac Axis and is the largest lake in the park. It is a long, narrow shaped lake, accessible by the main road into the park and by many hiking trails. Despite the name Big Salmon Lake, there are no salmon in the lake. There are no major islands in the lake, but there are a few small ones in the east end of the lake. A notable one of these islands is Devil's Oven, named by homesteaders for a hollowed rock formation resembling an oven.

== See also ==
- List of lakes in Ontario
