= Reach for the Rainbow =

Canadian registered charity serving children and young adults with disabilities

Reach for the Rainbow (RFTR), was a registered charity serving children and young adults with developmental and physical disabilities in Ontario, Canada. Founded in 1987 by Donna Trella, its camp programs later grew under Director of Programs David Neal.

The registered charity partnered with established summer camps and year-round community programs to provide the support needed for children with physical and developmental disabilities to participate fully in camp life. This approach allowed campers to be integrated into same-age groups alongside their typically developing peers. Since its establishment, RFTR worked with a wide range of day and overnight camps across Ontario.

The years listed indicate when each program's partnership began: Cairn-Glen Mhor (1988), John Island Camp (1989), Pearce Williams Christian Centre (1992), Canterbury Hills Overnight Camp (1993), Camp Kitchikewana (1993), Camp Pine Crest (1993), Camp Wanakita (1994), YMCA of Oakville Day Camps (1994), Ryerson Camp (1997), Silver Lake Camp (1997), Cave Springs Camp (1999), Lambton Centre (2000), Camp Presqu'ile (2001), Camp Ko-Mo-Kee (2003), Forest Cliff Camps (2005), Hidden Bay Leadership Camp (2005), RKY Camp (2005), Camp Maple Leaf (2017), Hockey Opportunity Camp (2017), Royal Botanical Gardens Discovery Camp (2017) and Camp Menesetung (2017).

RFTR was supported by the following companies and foundations: Air Canada Foundation, Alice & Murray Maitland Foundation, BMW Group Canada, CIBC Children’s Foundation, Cadillac Fairview, Crayola Canada, Elementary Teachers’ Federation of Ontario, Harry E. Foster Charitable Foundation, Hughes Amys, J.W. McConnell Family Foundation and the Social Innovation Generation (SiG), Isberg Charitable Trust, Kildare Trust Foundation, The Lillian Meighen and Don Wright Foundation, Marion Ethel & Frederick John Kamm Foundation, The McLean Foundation, Maple Leafs Sports and Entertainment (MLSE), Ontario Trillium Foundation, SickKids Foundation, and TELUS Community Investment.
