= Big Salmon River =

Big Salmon River may refer to the following rivers in Canada:

- Big Salmon River (New Brunswick)
- Big Salmon River (Yukon)
