= Charleston Lake =

Lake in Ontario, Canada

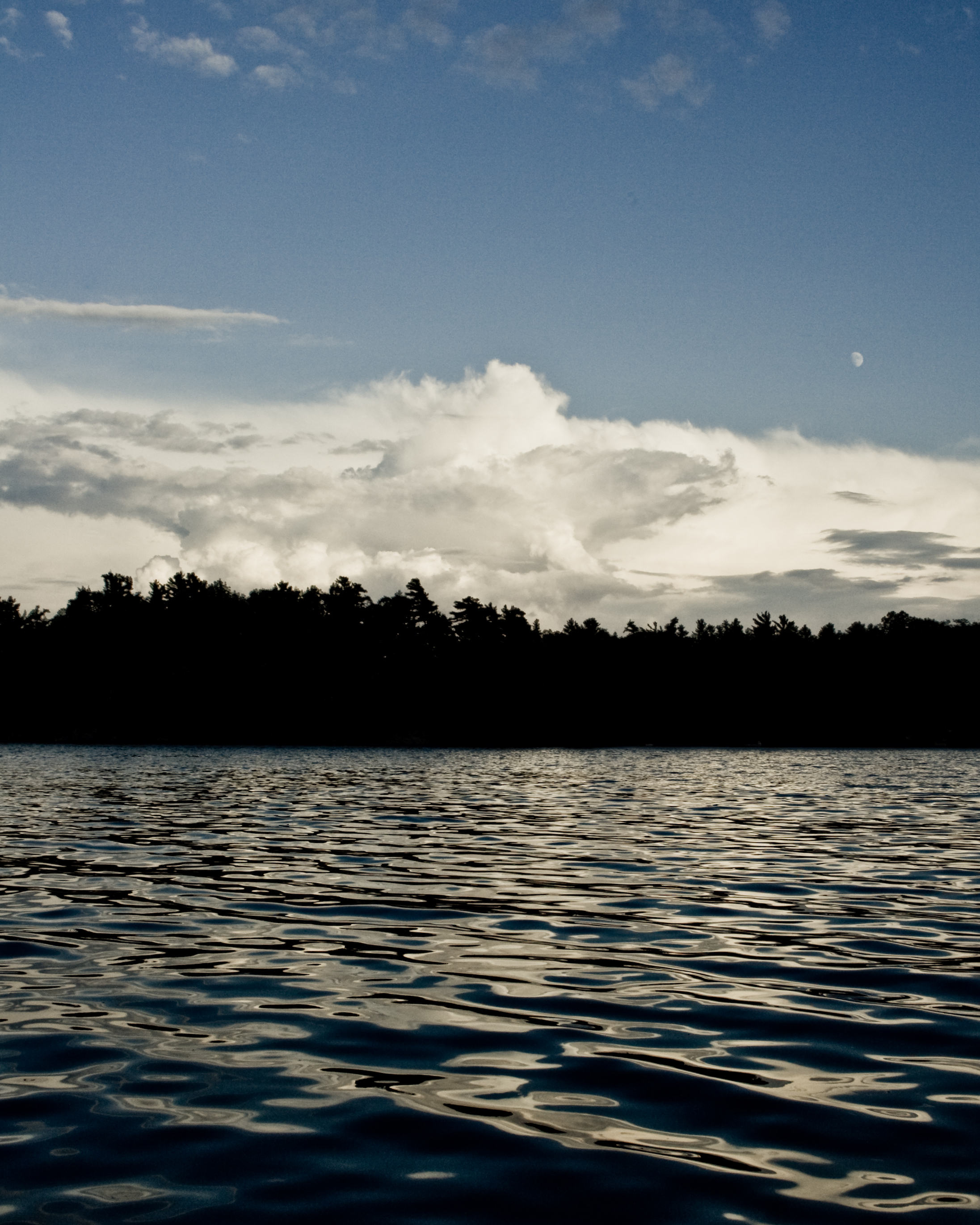

- Location within Ontario
- Location: Ontario
- Coordinates: 44°32′N 76°00′W
- Basin countries: Canada
- Max. depth: 91.1 m (299 ft)

Charleston Lake is located in South Eastern Ontario, just north east of Gananoque. The lake is carved out of the Frontenac Axis, a relatively narrow extension of the Canadian Shield bedrock which dominates the landscape of Northern Ontario. The lake is the principal watershed for the Gananoque River, and boasts prime fishing locations. Charleston Lake Provincial Park is located on the shores of the lake, and offers camping, hiking, boating, fishing and interpretive sessions.

Charleston Lake has over 100 miles of shoreline and over 100 islands with over 800 summer and permanent residences on the lake. The water surface is 26.2 km^{2}, and the maximum depth is 91.1 m. A naturally occurring rock and tree formation shows a profile of the guardian of Charleston Lake known as Indian Head. Other than Charleston Lake Provincial Park, the County Park and Sand Bay are excellent destinations for day trips.

For five years culminating in 2005, Charleston Lake was the site for re-introduction of the peregrine falcon with the Canadian Peregrine Foundation, Ontario Power Generation and Leeds County Stewardship Council.
