= Frontenac Arch Biosphere Reserve =

UNESCO Biosphere Reserve in Ontario, Canada

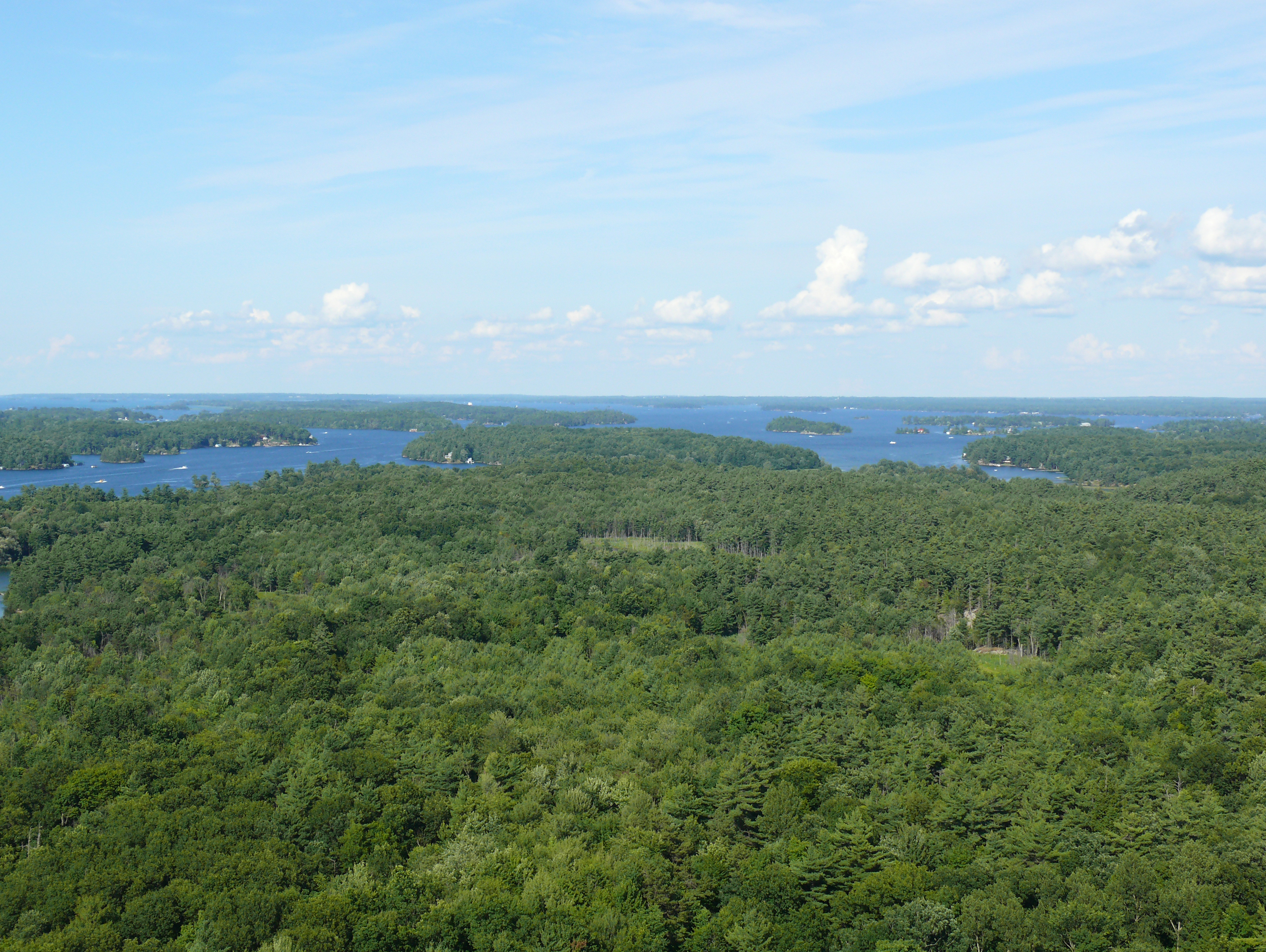
- Thousand Islands National Park

- Location within Southern Ontario Location within Canada
- Location: Ontario, Canada
- Coordinates: 44°30′03″N 76°14′26″W
- Area: 220,973 hectares (853.18 sq mi)
- Established: 2002
- Governing body: Frontenac Arch Biosphere Reserve Network
- Website: www.frontenacarchbiosphere.ca

The Frontenac Arch Biosphere Reserve is a UNESCO Biosphere Reserve located in southeastern Ontario, Canada. The biosphere reserve was designated in 2002, and is one of 16 biosphere reserves in Canada. The Frontenac Arch Biosphere operates primarily within a 2,700 km^{2} region from Brockville to Kingston, extending north to Verona and Perth.

The Frontenac Arch Biosphere is located in the Thousand Islands - Frontenac Arch area, in one of the great crossroads of eastern Canada. An ancient granite bridge, called the Frontenac Arch, runs from the northern Canadian Shield in Algonquin Park to the Adirondack Mountains in the United States. The granite arch intersects with the St. Lawrence River in the southernmost part of the Frontenac Arch Biosphere boundary, as the St. Lawrence River runs southwest to northeast from Kingston to Brockville.

The biosphere reserve operates as a not-for-profit network, called the Frontenac Arch Biosphere Network, with over 100 regional partners, and a suite of programs aimed at encouraging the community to become a global model for sustainable development. The Frontenac Arch Biosphere’s activities are guided by three core functions as set by UNESCO and the Man and the Biosphere Programme:

1. Conservation: To contribute to the protection of cultural diversity and biodiversity through sharing of knowledge and best practices concerning the conservation of ecosystems, species and the natural biodiversity of the region.
2. Sustainable Development: To foster and promote human development that is socially, culturally, economically and ecologically sustainable for all time.
3. Capacity Building: To facilitate dialogue and information-sharing between communities, resource sectors, governments and researchers, for the purpose of education, training, research and/or monitoring projects.

== Area ==
The reserve's surface area (terrestrial and marine) is 220,973 hectares (853.18 sq mi). The core area is 5,073 hectares (19.59 sq mi), surrounded by buffer zone(s) of 15,900 hectares (61 sq mi) and transition area(s) of 200,000 hectares (770 sq mi).

== Ecological characteristics ==
The topography of the biosphere reserve is rugged, consisting of steep, rocky slopes and ridges, typical of the Precambrian Shield. These alternate with moist forest or wetland valleys inland, and rocky promontories in the Saint Lawrence River known as the Thousand Islands.

First Nations call the Frontenac Arch the "backbone of the mother"– Mother Nature’s spinal column. Five separate forest regions meet at the crossroads of the Frontenac Arch and the Saint Lawrence River, creating a rich ecosystem of plant, insect and animal species, renowned as the most biodiverse region in Canada. It has a long and rich cultural heritage and serves as the gateway through which the Saint Lawrence River flows into Canada.

Characteristic species of the area include the pitch pine (Pinus rigada), the black rat snake (Pantherophis spiloides) – Canada’s largest reptile and a threatened species, the least bittern (Ixobrychus exilis) – the smallest member of the heron family and listed as a species of special concern, the great blue heron (Ardea Herodias), the osprey (Pandion haliaetus), the common loon (Gavia immer), the bald eagle (Haliaeetus leucocephalus) and the pine warbler (Dendroica pinus).

== Socio-economic characteristics ==
The main traditional industry in the inland part of the biosphere reserve is agriculture. Other main economic activities include fishing, forestry and mining. Water-oriented recreation and tourism are major economic sectors in shoreline communities along the Saint Lawrence River, the Rideau Canal and Charleston Lake.

The Thousand Islands, the Frontenac Arch region and the Saint Lawrence River have a long history of human habitation. Archaeological sites found in the Thousand Islands indicate that people visited the area as early as 7,000 years ago, and that Laurentian and Point Peninsula cultures used the area as hunting and fishing grounds.

== See also ==
- Biosphere Reserves of Canada

== Sources ==
This article incorporates text from a free content work (license statement/permission). Text taken from UNESCO - MAB Biosphere Reserves Directory, UNESCO, UNESCO.
