= Thousand Islands National Park =

National park in Ontario, Canada

- Parc national des Mille-Îles
- IUCN category II (national park)
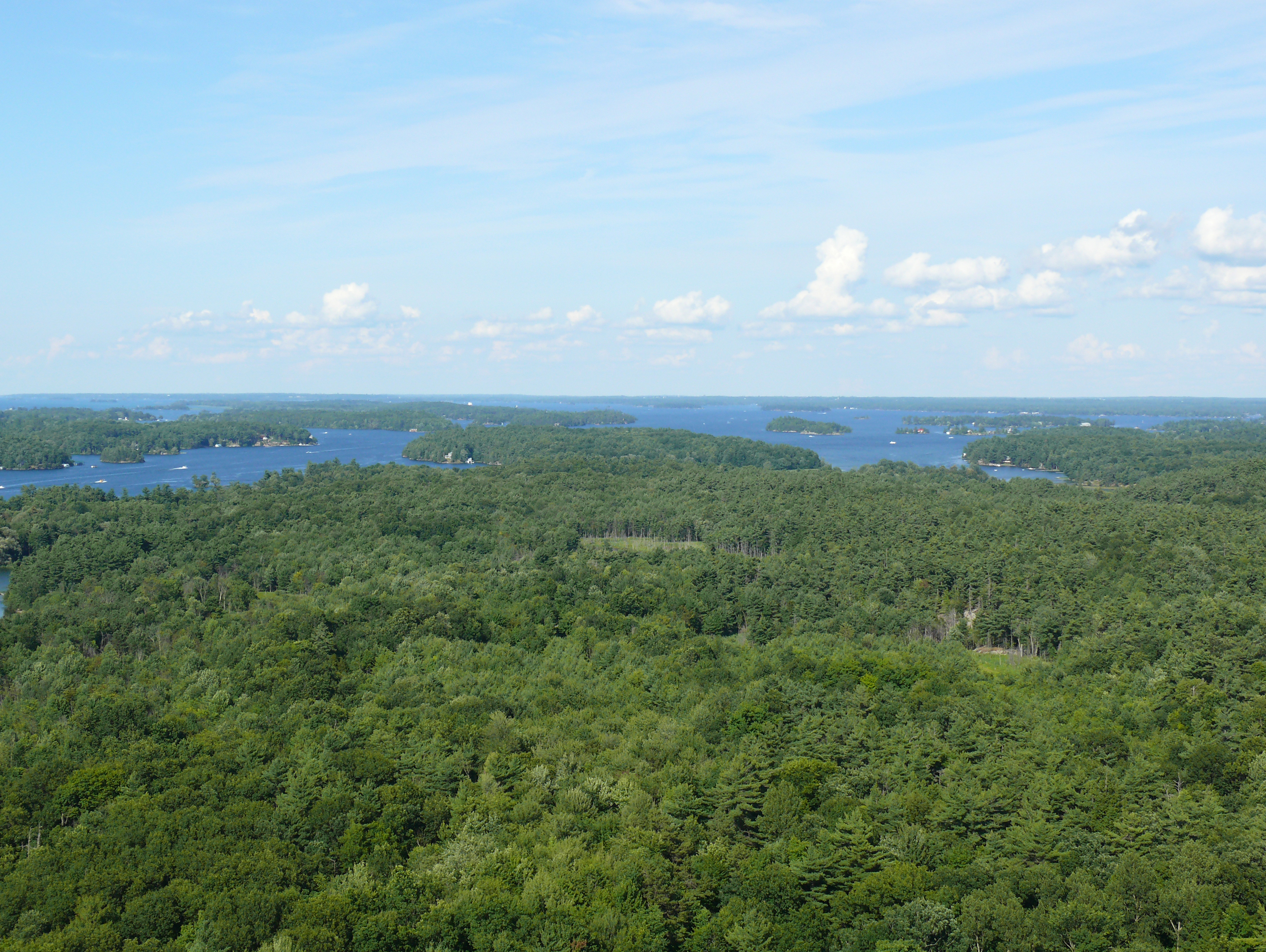
- Aerial view of Thousand Islands National Park

- Location within Canada Location within Southern Ontario
- Interactive map of Thousand Islands National Park
- Location: United Counties of Leeds and Grenville, Ontario, Canada
- Nearest city: Brockville, Ontario
- Coordinates: 44°21′09″N 75°57′19″W
- Area: 24.4 km^{2} (9.4 sq mi)
- Established: 1904
- Visitors: 109.284 (in 2022–23)
- Governing body: Parks Canada

Thousand Islands National Park (established 1904), formerly known as the St. Lawrence Islands National Park, is a Canadian National Park located on the 1000 Islands Parkway in the Thousand Islands Region of the Saint Lawrence River. The islands are actually the worn-down tops of ancient mountains. This region, the Frontenac Axis, connects the Canadian Shield from Algonquin Park in Ontario to the Adirondack Mountains in New York.

The park consists of 21 islands plus many smaller islets, 2 mainland properties and a visitor centre at Mallorytown, Ontario on the mainland. It is one of Canada's smallest national parks with a total area of 24.4 square kilometres (9.4 sq mi).

Much of the park is only accessible by boat. Trail systems can be found on the mainland along the 1000 Islands Parkway at Mallorytown Landing, Jones Creek and Landon Bay. There are picnic, camping and oTENTik facilities on several islands and at Mallorytown Landing. Mallorytown Landing is a day use area that offers a large parking, a boat ramp, several oTENTiks, picnic gazebos, playground, animal exhibits, travelling exhibits, and interpreters.

The Frontenac Arch Biosphere Reserve, in which the park is located, is known for being the most biodiverse region in Canada.

== History ==
The first inhabitants of the park area are thought to have been hunting and fishing peoples who arrived following the last glacial period approximately 10,000 years ago. Many artifacts have been found in the park, including a 2500-year-old pot that was found by a diver in 1979. Pictographs are still visible on some shoreline cliffs.

By the early 17th century, the Iroquois people had put up large summer encampments on the riverbanks from which they fished the rich waters. Around this time the area began to be visited by French explorers, fur traders, and missionaries following the St Lawrence river to seek their fortune in the new world. Following the American Revolution at the end of the 18th century, European settlers began moving into the area and the traditional fishing encampments were displaced. A few Iroquois still returned to fish, but by the 1860s fish stocks were greatly depleted.

During the War of 1812, the area of today's National Park was visited by both British and American warships. A British gunboat was sunk nearby and the preserved hull was raised in 1967. It now resides at the park. Martello towers were built in the area to defend the British from American invasion. Inside the park, Cedar Island, a small island visible from downtown Kingston, Ontario, is the site of a Martello tower named Cathcart Tower.

The park was established in 1904, the first Canadian national park east of the Rocky Mountains. It was called St. Lawrence Islands National Park until 2013, when it was renamed to Thousand Islands National Park to reflect the natural area in the name.

In 1997, the park was named one of the national parks with the highest levels of ecological impairment.

Since 2019, the park has hosted experimental theatre performances on Cedar Island, as part of The Kick & Push Festival.

== Fauna ==
Animals that inhabit this national park are coyotes, deer, porcupines, beavers, foxes, skunks, raccoons, turkey vultures, rabbits, squirrels, chickadees, and weasels.

== See also ==
- National Parks of Canada
- List of National Parks of Canada
- List of Ontario parks
