= Thousand Islands – Frontenac Arch =

Geologic region in North America

Coordinates: 44.7624°N 75.3158°W

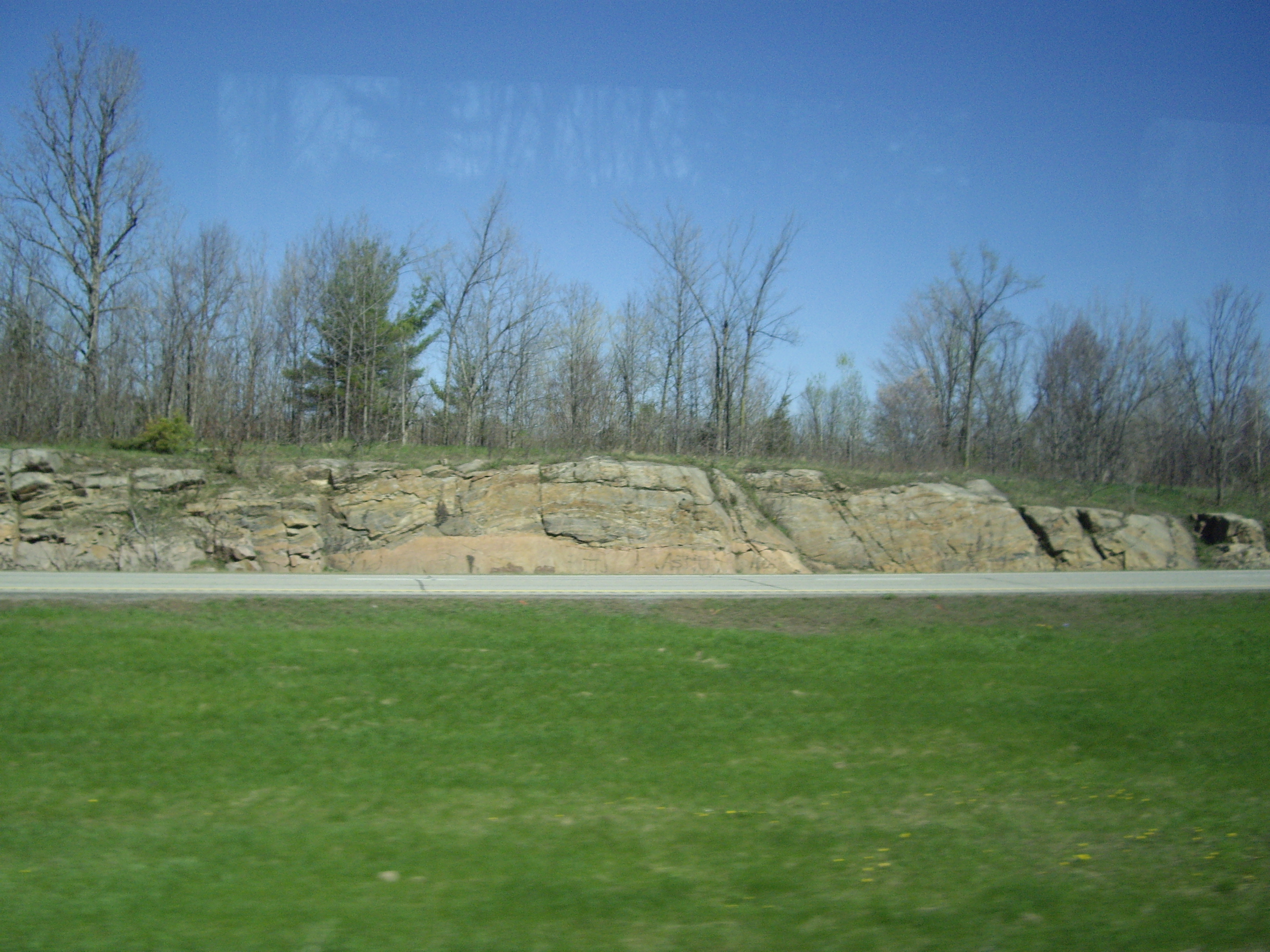
An outcrop of the Frontenac Axis near Cornwall, Ontario

The Thousand Islands – Frontenac Arch region or the Frontenac Axis is an exposed strip of Precambrian rock in Canada and the United States that links the Canadian Shield from Algonquin Park with the Adirondack Mountain region in New York, an extension of the Laurentian Mountains of Québec. The Algonquin to Adirondacks region, which includes the Frontenac Axis or Arch, is a critical linkage for biodiversity and resilience, and one with important conservation potential. The axis separates the St. Lawrence Lowlands to the east and the Great Lakes Lowlands to the west. It has many distinctive plant and animal species, and is one of four ecoregions of the Mixedwood Plains.

The Thousand Islands in the Saint Lawrence River have a distinctive flora and fauna and are a part of the biological corridor.

== Geology ==
The bedrock is mostly gneiss, granite, and marble, more than a billion years old. The Frontenac terrain is the youngest of the Ontario portions of the arch, dated at 1.2 billion years old. These rocks were once part of a large mountain chain of the ancient supercontinent of Rodinia. There is also a meteor crater near Holleford, where the shield meets the limestone plains of southeastern Ontario.

== Ecology ==
The area is distinctive for having tree species typically found further south, and reaching their northern limits. One example is pitch pine (Pinus rigida). Shallow soils and recurring fire have also produced unusual fire barren communities. These provide habitat for rare plants, such as bear oak (Quercus ilicifolia) and deerberry (Vaccinium stamineum), as well as rare animals, such as the five-lined skink (Plestiodon fasciatus) and Central ratsnake (Pantherophis alleghaniensis). There is high bird diversity, including the cerulean warbler, considered nationally endangered owing to the destruction of forests. Although the most important factor producing the fauna and flora is likely the bedrock, the moderating effect of the Great Lakes may also be factor. Also, some northern species extend their range south, drawn by the rugged granite landscapes of the Canadian Shield.

The basic ecosystem type of the area is temperate deciduous forest. The area has a long history of logging, which has depleted these forests of larger trees. Settlement tends to have occurred in the areas of deeper soil, and fire has particularly influenced the uplands. Reference to the forest descriptions of early surveyors has documented decline in species such as hemlock, which were preferentially removed for leather tanning. Criteria for restoring these forests have been established, and include increased tree size, spring ephemeral abundance, and coarse woody debris. Pollen cores from Lanark County provide information about longer term trends in forest cover.

There is a wide array of wetlands, ranging from larger marshes along the St. Lawrence river, to smaller marshes and bogs along water courses, and large numbers of beaver ponds. The cycles in vegetation in beaver ponds contribute to further wetland diversity; depending upon the amount of beaver activity, there may be open water, marsh, wet meadows or shrub thickets. Some lakes in the area, such as Bob's Lake, also support uncommon species of turtles, such as the map turtles and Blanding's turtles. Where there is marble bedrock, or other sources of calcium, fens may arise. These often have unusual calcium dependent wetland plants.

A southern portion of this region was designated a Biosphere Reserve by UNESCO in 2002, the Frontenac Arch Biosphere Reserve. Within this biosphere reserve is the relatively small St. Lawrence Islands National Park. Although it is small, it has many Frontenac Arch species mentioned above, including deerberry, Blanding's turtle, and five-lined skinks. Further north, there is still a large gap in the ecological link to Algonquin Park. In this gap are smaller parks such as Frontenac Provincial Park and Bon Echo Provincial Park.
