= Temperate deciduous forest =

Deciduous forest in the temperate regions

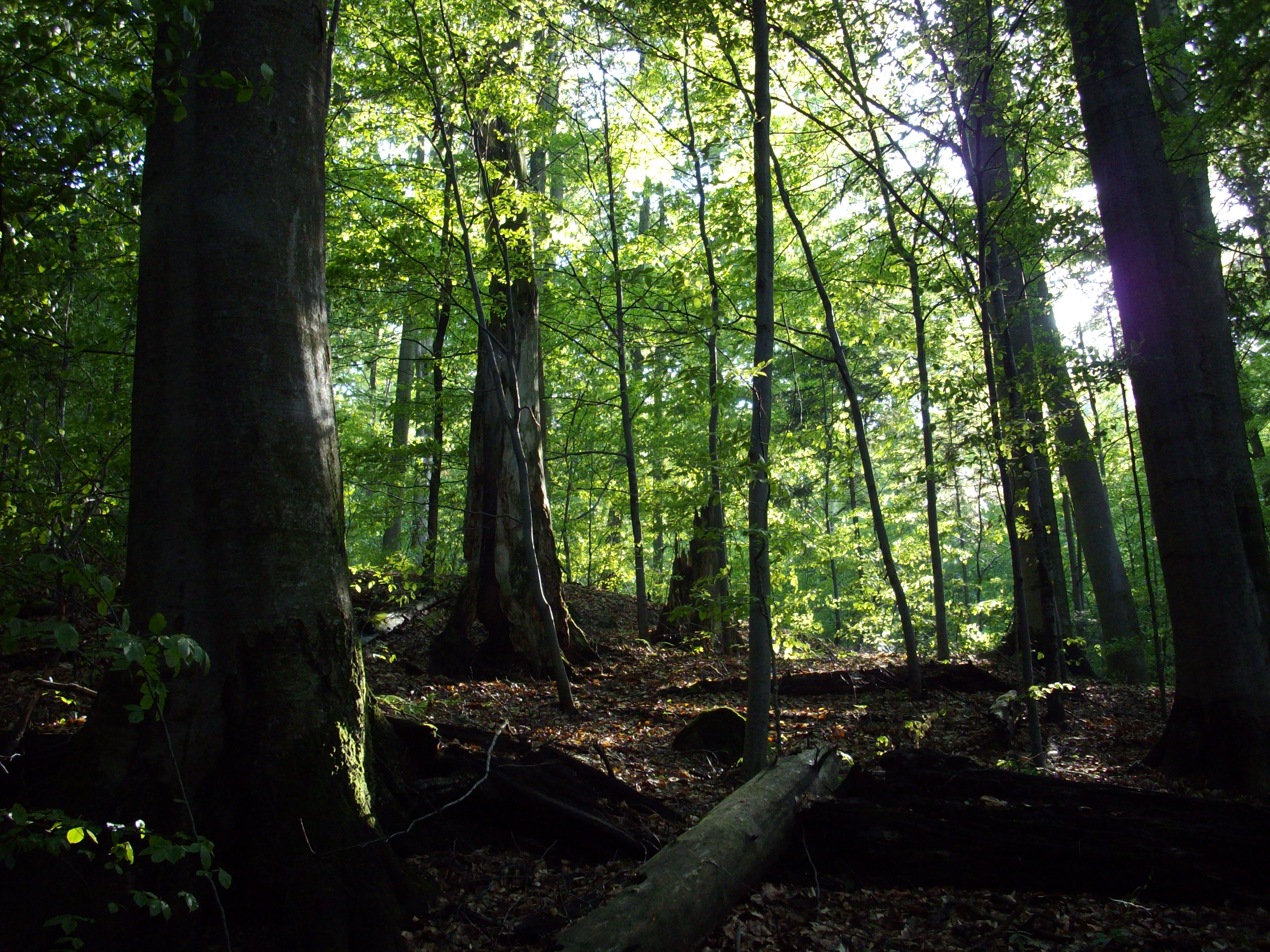
Old growth beech forest in Slovakia

Temperate deciduous or temperate broadleaf forests are a variety of temperate forest mostly composed of deciduous trees that lose their leaves each winter. They represent one of Earth's major biomes, making up 9.69% of global land area. These forests are found in areas with distinct seasonal variation that cycle through warm, moist summers, cold winters, and moderate fall and spring seasons. They are most commonly found in the Northern Hemisphere, with particularly large regions in eastern North America, East Asia, and a large portion of Europe, though smaller regions of temperate deciduous forests are also located in South America. Examples of trees typically growing in the Northern Hemisphere's deciduous forests include oak, maple, basswood, beech and elm, while in the Southern Hemisphere, trees of the genus Nothofagus dominate this type of forest. Temperate deciduous forests provide several unique ecosystem services, including habitats for diverse wildlife, and they face a set of natural and human-induced disturbances that regularly alter their structure.

== Geography ==
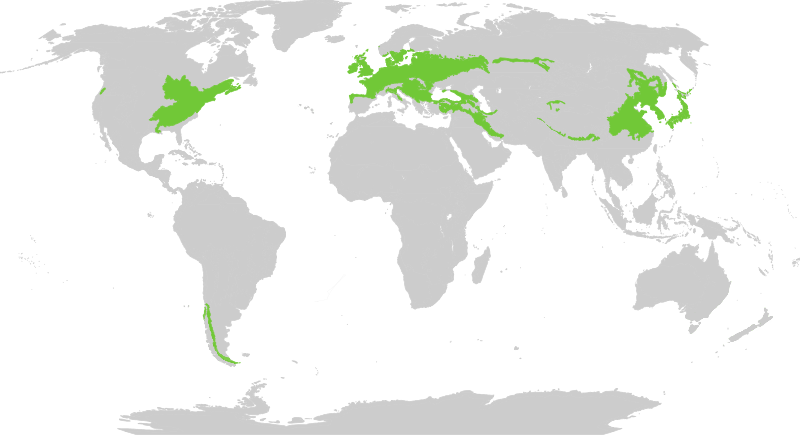
Global distribution of the temperate deciduous forest biome

Located below the northern boreal forests, temperate deciduous forests make up a significant portion of the land between the Tropic of Cancer (23$\tfrac{1}{2}$°N) and latitudes of 50° North, in addition to areas south of the Tropic of Capricorn (23$\tfrac{1}{2}$°S). Canada, the United States, China, and several European countries have the largest land area covered by temperate deciduous forests, with smaller portions present throughout South America, specifically Chile and Argentina.

== Climate ==
Temperate conditions refer to the cycle through four distinct seasons that occurs in areas between the polar regions and tropics. In these regions where temperate deciduous forest are found, warm and cold air circulation accounts for the biome's characteristic seasonal variation.

=== Temperature ===
The average annual temperature tends to be around 10 °Celsius, though this is dependent on the region. Due to shading from the canopy, the microclimate of temperate deciduous forests tends to be about 2.1 °Celsius cooler than the surroundings, whereas winter temperatures are from 0.4 to 0.9 °Celsius warmer within forests as a result of insulation from vegetation strata.

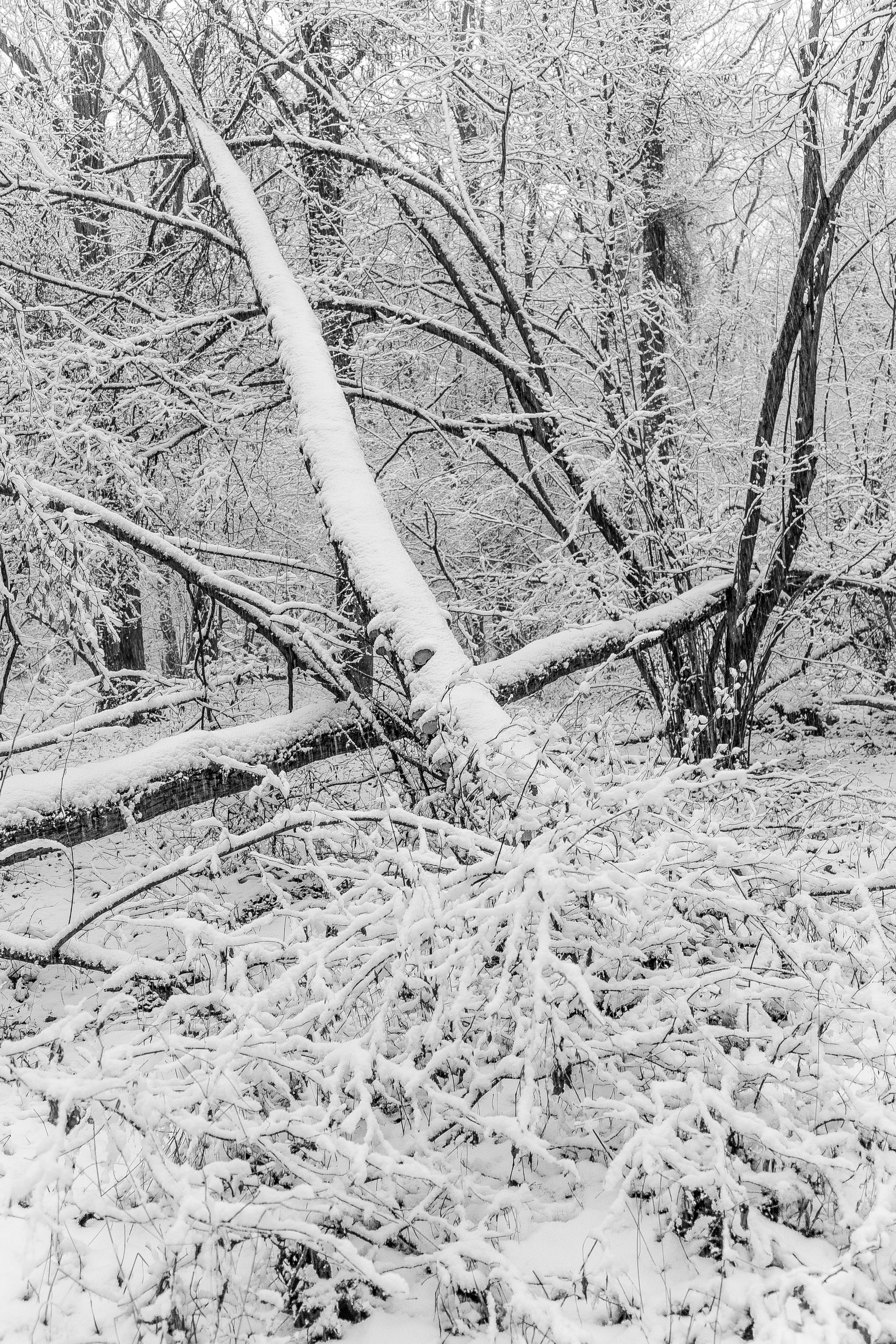
Snow-covered, leafless deciduous trees in the winter

=== Precipitation ===
Annually, temperate deciduous forests experience approximately 750 to 1,500 millimeters of precipitation. As there is no distinct rainy season, precipitation is spread relatively evenly throughout the year. Snow makes up a portion of the precipitation present in temperate deciduous forests in the winter. Tree branches can intercept up to 80% of snowfall, affecting the amount of snow that ultimately reaches and melts on the forest floor.

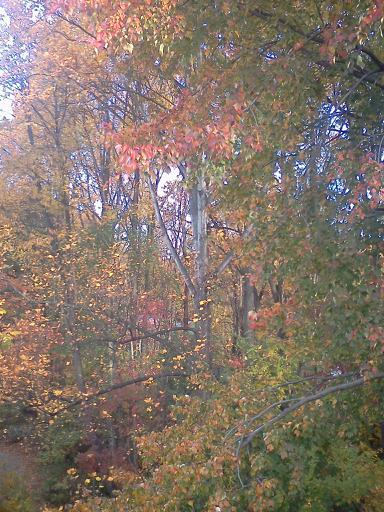
Changes in leaf color of deciduous trees in the fall

=== Seasonal variation ===
A factor of temperate deciduous forests is their leaf loss during the transition from fall to winter, an adaptation that arose as a solution for the low sunlight conditions and bitter cold temperatures. In these forests, winter is a time of dormancy for plants, when broadleaf deciduous trees conserve energy and prevent water loss, and many animal species hibernate or migrate. Preceding winter is fruit-bearing autumn, a time when leaves change color to various shades of red, yellow, and orange as chlorophyll breakdown gives rise to anthocyanin, carotene, and xanthophyl pigments.

Besides the characteristic colorful autumns and leafless winters, temperate deciduous forests have a lengthy growing season during the spring and summer months that tends to last anywhere from 120 to 250 days. Spring in temperate deciduous forests is a period of ground vegetation and seasonal herb growth, a process that starts early in the season before trees have regrown their leaves and when ample sunlight is available. Once a suitable temperature is reached in mid- to late spring, budding and flowering of tall deciduous trees also begins. In the summer, when fully-developed leaves occupy all trees, a moderately-dense canopy creates shade, increasing the humidity of forested areas.

== Characteristics ==
=== Soil ===
Though there is latitudinal variation in soil quality of temperate deciduous forests, with those at central latitudes having a higher soil productivity than those more north or south, soil in this biome is overall highly fertile. The fallen leaves from deciduous trees introduce detritus to the forest floor, increasing levels of nutrients and organic matter in the soil. The high soil productivity of temperate deciduous forests puts them at a high risk of conversion to agricultural land for human use.

=== Flora ===
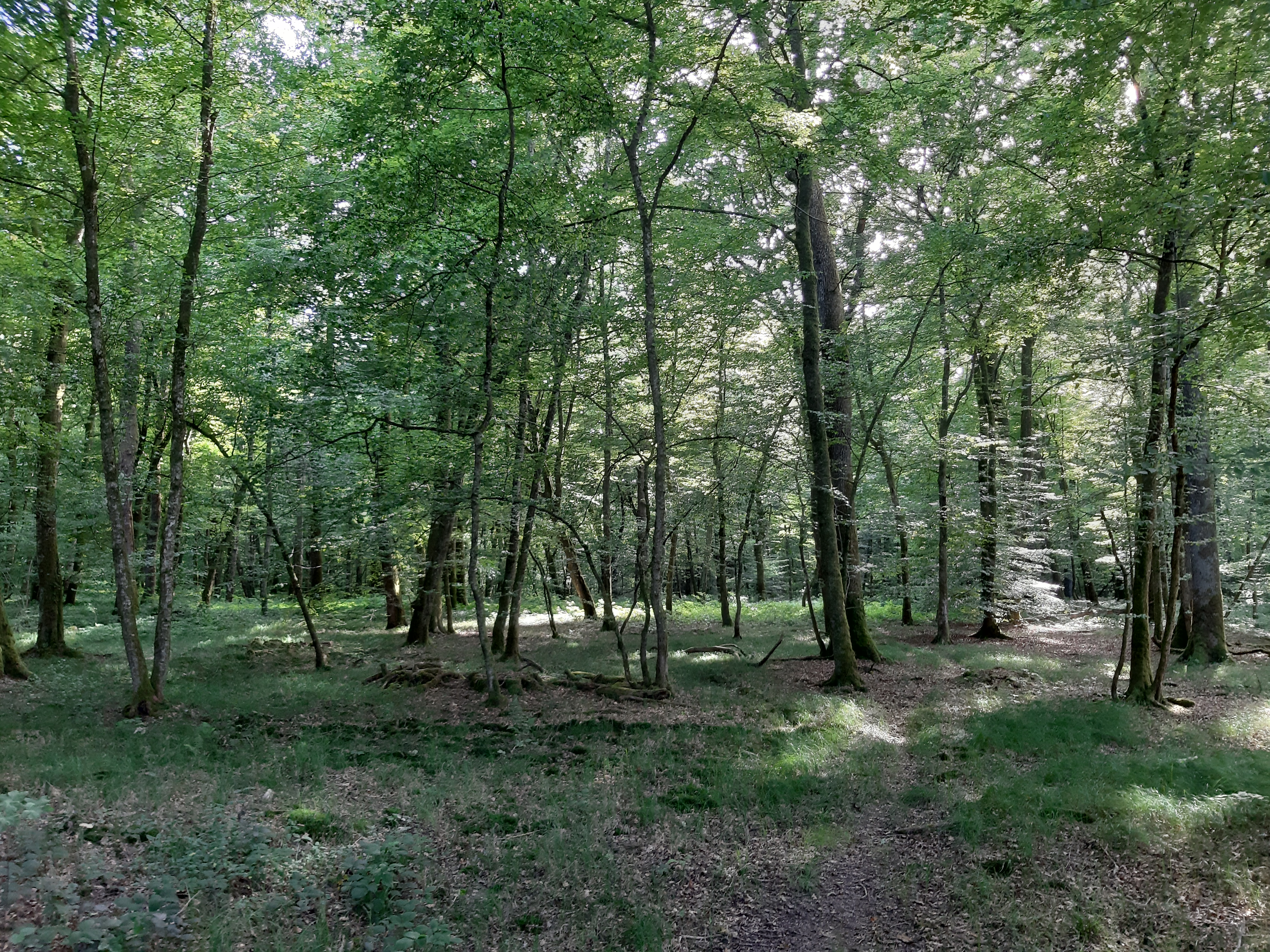
Temperate deciduous forest canopy gaps and vegetation strata

Temperate deciduous forests are characterized by a variety of temperate deciduous tree species that vary based on region. Most tree species present in temperate deciduous forests are broadleaf trees that lose their leaves in the fall, though some coniferous trees such as pines (Pinus) are present in northern temperate deciduous forests. Europe's temperate deciduous forests are rich with oaks of the genus Quercus, European beech trees (Fagus sylvatica), and hornbeams (Fagus grandifolia), while those in Asia tend to have maples of the genus Acer, a variety of ash trees (Fraxinus), and basswoods (Tilia). Similarly to Asia, North American forests have maples, especially Acer saccharum, and basswoods, in addition to hickories (Carya) and American chestnuts (Castanea dentata). Southern beech (Nothofagus) trees are prevalent in the temperate deciduous forests of South America. Elm trees (Ulmus) and willows (Salix) can also be found dispersed throughout the temperate deciduous forests of the world. While a wide variety of tree species can be found throughout the temperate deciduous forest biome, tree species richness is typically moderate in each individual ecosystem, with only 3 to 4 tree species per square kilometer.

Besides the old-growth trees that, with their domed tree crowns, form a canopy that lets little light filter through, a sub-canopy of shrubs such as mountain laurel and azaleas is present. These other plant species found in the canopy layers below the 35- to 40-meter mature trees are either adapted to low-light conditions or follow a seasonal schedule of growth that allows them to thrive before the formation of the canopy from mid-spring through mid-fall. Mosses and lichens make up significant ground cover, though they are also found growing on trees.

=== Fauna ===
In addition to characteristic flora, temperate deciduous forests are home to several animal species that rely on the trees and other plant life for shelter and resources, such as squirrels, rabbits, skunks, birds, mountain lions, bobcats, timber wolves, foxes, and black bears. Deer are also present in large populations, though they are clearing rather than true forest animals. Large deer populations have deleterious effects on tree regeneration overall, and grazing also has significant negative effects on the number and kind of herbaceous flowering plants. The continuous increase of deer populations and killing of top carnivores suggests that overgrazing by deer will continue.

== Ecosystem services ==
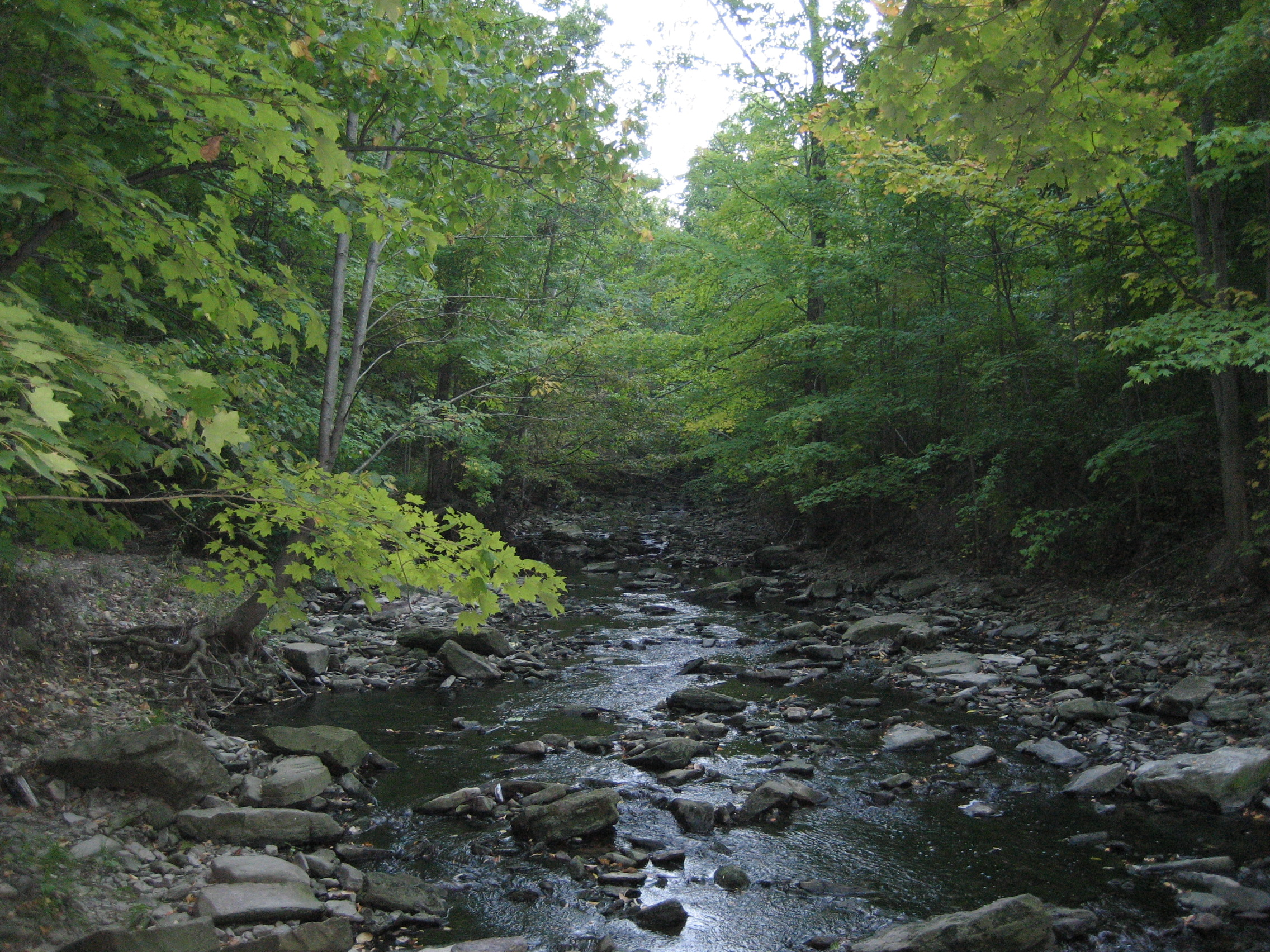
Forests maintain water flow in streams

Temperate deciduous forests provide several provisioning, regulating, supporting, and cultural ecosystem services. With a higher biodiversity than boreal forests, temperate deciduous forests maintain their genetic diversity by providing the supporting service of habitat availability for a variety of plants and animal species dependent on shade. These forests play a role in the regulation of air and soil quality by preventing soil erosion and flooding, while also storing carbon in their soil. Provisioning services provided by temperate deciduous forests include access to sources of drinking water, oxygen, food, timber, and biomass. Humans depend on temperate deciduous forests for cultural services, using them as spaces for recreation and spiritual practices.

== Disturbances ==
Natural disturbances cause regular renewal of temperate deciduous forests and create a healthy, heterogeneous environment with constantly changing structures and populations. Weather events like snow, storms, and wind can cause varying degrees of change to the structure of forest canopies, creating log habitats for small animals and spaces for less shade-tolerant species to grow where fallen trees once stood. Other abiotic sources of disturbances to temperate deciduous forests include droughts, waterlogging, and fires. Natural surface fire patterns are especially important in pine reproduction. Biotic factors affecting forests take the form of fungal outbreaks in addition to mountain pine beetle and bark beetle infestations. These beetles are particularly prevalent in North America and kill trees by clogging their vascular tissue. Temperate deciduous forests tend to be resilient after minor weather-related disturbances, though major insect infestations, widespread anthropogenic disturbances, and catastrophic weather events can cause century-long succession or even the permanent conversion of the forest into a grassland.

=== Climate change ===
Rising temperatures and increased dryness in temperate deciduous forests have been noted in recent years as the climate changes. As a result, temperate deciduous forests have been experiencing an earlier onset to spring, as well as a global increase in the frequency and intensity of disturbances. They have been experiencing lower ecological resilience in the face of increasing mega-fires, longer droughts, and severe storms. Damaged wood from increased storm disturbance events provides nesting habitats for beetles, concurrently increasing bark beetle damage. Forest cover decreases with continuous severe disturbances, causing habitat loss and lower biodiversity.

== Human use and impact ==
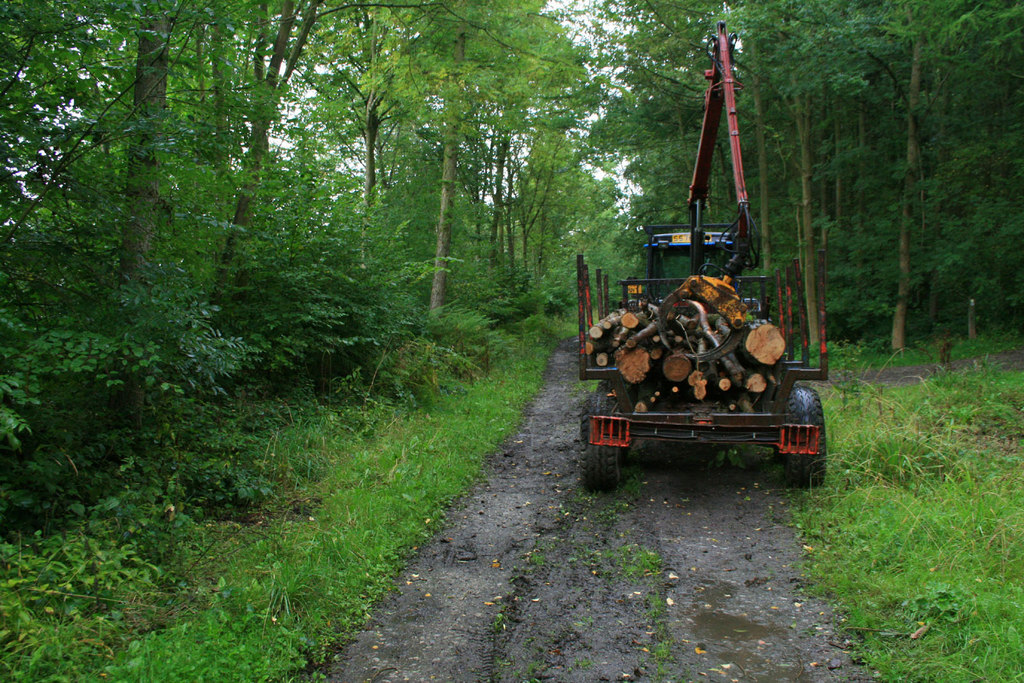
A logging truck and trailer transporting lumber from a temperate deciduous forest

Humans rely on wood from temperate deciduous forests for use in the timber industry as well as paper and charcoal production. Logging practices emit high levels of carbon while also causing erosion because fewer tree roots are present to provide soil support. During the European colonization of North America, potash made from tree ashes was exported back to Europe as fertilizer. At this time in history, clearcutting of the original temperate deciduous forests was also performed to make space for agricultural land use, so many forests now present are second-growth. Over 50% of temperate deciduous forests are affected by fragmentation, resulting in small fragments dissected by fields and roads; these islands of green often differ substantially from the original forests and cause challenges for species migration. Seminatural temperate deciduous forests with developed trail systems serve as sites for tourism and recreational activities, such as hiking and hunting. In addition to fragmentation, human use of land adjacent to temperate deciduous forests is associated with pollution that can stunt the growth rate of trees. Invasive species that outcompete native species and alter forest nutrient cycles, such as common buckthorn (Rhamnus cathartica), are also introduced by humans. The introduction of exotic diseases, especially, continues to be a threat to forest trees and, hence, the forest. Humans have also introduced earthworms in deciduous forests in North America, which has had a deep impact on the ecosystem and reduced biodiversity.

=== Conservation ===
A method for preserving temperate deciduous forests that has been used in the past is fire suppression. The process of preventing fires is associated with the build-up of biomass that, ultimately, increases the intensity of incidental fires. As an alternative, prescribed burning has been put into practice, in which regular, managed fires are administered to forest ecosystems to imitate the natural disturbances that play a significant role in preserving biodiversity. To combat the effects of deforestation, reforestation has been employed.

== See also ==
- Temperate coniferous forest
- Temperate broadleaf and mixed forest
- International Year of Forests
- Old-growth forest
- Tropical evergreen forest
- Tropical deciduous forest
- Wood-pasture hypothesis
