= Ontario Highway 29 =

Former Ontario provincial highway

Highway 29
- A map of Highway 29, in red (as of December 31, 1997)

Route information
- Maintained by Ministry of Transportation of Ontario
- Length: 52.29 km (32.49 mi)
- Existed: May 11, 1927–January 1, 1998

Major junctions
- South end: Highway 2 (King Street) in Brockville
- Highway 401 – Kingston, Cornwall; Highway 42 west in Forthton
- North end: Highway 15 (Lombard Street / Beckwith Street) in Smiths Falls

Location
- Country: Canada
- Province: Ontario
- Counties: Leeds and Grenville
- Major cities: Brockville
- Towns: Smiths Falls
- Villages: Forthton, Addison, Frankville, Toledo, Newbliss

Highway system
- Ontario provincial highways; Current; Former; 400-series
← Highway 28	→ Highway 33
Former provincial highways
Highway 30 →

King's Highway 29, commonly referred to as Highway 29, was a provincially maintained highway in the Canadian province of Ontario. The 52.29-kilometre (32.49 mi) route connected Highway 2 (King Street) in downtown Brockville with Highway 15 (Lombard Street) south of Smiths Falls. Between those larger settlements, it provided access to the communities of Forthton, Addison, Frankville, Toledo and Newbliss.

When Highway 29 was established in 1927, it consisted of two separated halves. One half connected Brockville with Smiths Falls, while the other connected Carleton Place with Arnprior; Highway 15 provided the only provincial highway link between Smiths Falls and Carleton Place, via Perth. The missing link was filled in 1936. The highway was paved in its entirety the following year. In 1983, it was truncated at Smiths Falls, with the northern portion becoming part of Highway 15. The remainder of Highway 29 remained until 1998, when responsibility for maintenance of the route was transferred to the United Counties of Leeds and Grenville. It is now known as Leeds and Grenville County Road 29

== Route description ==
Highway 29 was a 52.29-kilometre (32.49 mi) route that connected Highway 2 in Brockville with Highway 15 in Smiths Falls. The former route provides access to several communities between the two locations. It is now designated as Leeds and Grenville County Road 29 outside of Brockville. Traffic levels along County Road 29 in 2018 were highest near Brockville, where approximately 11,300 vehicles travelled the road on an average day. Approximately 4,300 vehicles travelled the road approaching Smiths Falls. The least travelled portion of the road was near Newbliss, where 2,000 vehicles used the road, on an average day. Traffic volumes are unavailable within Brockville and Smiths Falls.

As the route existed prior to being decommissioned, Highway 29 began at King Street (itself formerly Highway 2) and Courthouse Avenue in downtown Brockville. Proceeding generally in a northwest direction, the former route travelled one block before splitting around the Leeds and Grenville County Court House, a National Historic Site. Northbound traffic followed Court House Square, Wall Street and Pearl Street, while southbound traffic followed William Street and Court Terrace. Both directions reconvened along William Street and crossed over the Canadian National Railway (CN) Kingston subdivision, adjacent to the Brockville VIA station; Williams Street became Stewart Boulevard north of the overpass. The former highway met and crossed over Highway 401 at Exit 696, next to the Brockville Shopping Centre before exiting Brockville approximately 250 metres (820 ft) north of Centennial Road.

Highway 29 continued into Elizabethtown-Kitley, where some low-density development extended along the route as it transitioned to a rural farmland setting. After passing through the communities of Tincap and Spring Valley, it curved west briefly before returning towards the northwest. It travelled through the hamlets of Glen Buell and Forthton, meeting the eastern terminus of former Highway 42 at the latter. Curving almost northward, it became fully immersed in farmland for most of its remaining length. It bisected the communities of Addison, Hawkes, and Frankville. After crossing the large marshland surrounding Irish Lake, the former highway made a large sweeping curve to the northeast, bypassing the community of Toledo.

Facing south along Highway 15, from above the Rideau Canal in Smiths Falls, towards the northern terminus of Highway 29

Highway 29 entered into a forested area as it travelled around Irish Lake. It turned north and later entered the community of Newbliss, curving northwest and returning to farmland shortly thereafter. At the hamlet of Shanes, the former highway intersected Kitley–South Elmsley Townline Road and crossed into the municipality of Rideau Lakes. It meandered northeast approaching the outskirts of Smiths Falls, before crossing into the town 100 metres (330 ft) south of Van Horne Avenue. Within Smiths Falls, the road took on the name Brockville Street. Highway 29 ended at a junction with Lombard Street (Highway 15 south) and Jasper Avenue that lies immediately south of the Rideau Canal. Through traffic continued north across the canal onto Beckwith Street South (Highway 15 north).

== History ==
=== Early history ===
Southern portion from Brockville as far as Toledo was opened as a wagon trail in 1816 by settlers heading inland to the newly established military town site of Perth via Rideau Ferry, and thus became known as the Perth Road. Smiths Falls did not begin to develop until the completion of the Rideau Canal in 1832. In 1837, work began to improve the road north from Brockville, though very little was accomplished over the following ten years, until the United Counties of Leeds and Grenville contracted the construction of a macadamised road from Brockville to Smiths Falls in 1847. This would be completed in 1852 and known as the Victoria Macadamised Road; tolls were collected for approximately a decade. Although numerous realignments straightened and shortened the road over the years, Highway 29 would largely come to follow this toll road.

=== Designation and paving ===
From 1936 until 1983, Highway 29 (in red) continued north from Smiths Falls along what is now Highway 15 (in blue). Bypassed segments are also shown (in dark yellow).

Highway 29 was first designated as a provincial route by the Department of Public Highways (DPHO), predecessor to the modern Ministry of Transportation of Ontario (MTO), in 1927. It was initially split into two separate halves, with a discontinuity between Smiths Falls and Carleton Place; Highway 15 provided the only provincial highway connection between the two towns, via Perth. Responsibility was assumed by the DPHO for the upkeep of the 49.1-kilometre (30.5 mi) southern portion of the road, within the United Counties of Leeds and Grenville, on May 11, 1927. The 44.6-kilometre (27.7 mi) northern portion, within Lanark County and Carleton County, was assumed on August 17, 1927. Until 1934, Highway 29 passed into downtown Almonte. That year saw the route redirected along what is now Christian Street along the western edge of the town, much to the chagrin of local residents. On January 9, 1936, it was announced that the 26-kilometre (16 mi) Franktown Road, connecting Smiths Falls with Carleton Place, would be improved and assumed as a provincial highway. This officially took place on August 5, 1936. The highway from Brockville to Arnprior now bore a single number and was 123.2 km (76.6 mi) long.

The majority of Highway 29 was a gravel road when it was assumed; by 1927, it was paved through Smiths Falls, between Carleton Place and Almonte, and through Pakenham. In addition, the Franktown Road was paved between Smiths Falls and south of Franktown. Paving operations between Brockville and Smiths Falls commenced in 1929, with the portion between west of Spring Valley and Forthton being completed that year. The Franktown Road was also paved entirely by then, except within its namesake town. Paving north of Brockville to the existing pavement west of Spring Valley was completed in 1930, and between Newbliss and Smiths Falls in 1931. Paving of the segment between Frankville and Newbliss, as well as through Franktown, followed in 1933. The final gap between Brockville and Smiths Falls — from Forthton to Newbliss — was paved in 1934.

Limited resources in the depression years resulted in other highways receiving priority attention, notably Highway 15 and Highway 17. As a result, the remainder of Highway 29 was paved in a piecemeal approach. The northern 10 km (6 mi) of the route, near Arnprior, were paved in 1932; a short segment between Almonte and the Indian River in 1934. Approximately 6.2 km (3.9 mi) were paved south of Pakenham the following year. The remaining gaps, near Pakenham — a 4.5 km (3 mi) section south to the Indian River, and a 9.6 km (6.0 mi) section north to the Lanark–Carleton county line — were improved by 1937, completing the paving of the highway.

Highway 29 south of Smiths Falls in 1943

=== Improvements, concurrencies, and downloading ===
Until the 1950s, Highway 29 connected to King Street in downtown Brockville via Perth Avenue. On October 9, 1952, Stewart Boulevard was opened, connecting with William Street. A few years later in October 1954, a contract to construct the Brockville Bypass section of Highway 401 was awarded. Construction of the cloverleaf interchange at Highway 29 began in 1957. Both the interchange and the eastbound lanes of Highway 401 (from west of Brockville to Prescott) were opened by Minister of Highways, Frederick Cass, on November 13, 1959. The westbound lanes opened 10 months later on September 16, 1960.

Two other highways were signed concurrently with Highway 29 over the course of its existence. In August 1935, the DHO took over the route between Forthton and Westport as Highway 42. It was signed concurrently with Highway 29 between Brockville and Forthton at the same time. Until the 1960s, Highway 15 connected Smiths Falls with Carleton Place via Perth. By the mid-1950s, the well-established highway network had changed travel characteristics, and the numbering of Highway 15 between Perth and Ottawa confused motorists. The Ottawa Board of Trade petitioned the Department of Highways to renumber several highways surrounding the city. The department performed a series of renumberings similar to these recommendations following the extension of Highway 43 on September 8, 1961. Highway 15 was rerouted between Smiths Falls and Carleton Place to travel concurrently with Highway 29; Highway 7 was extended along the former routing from Perth to Carleton Place and signed concurrently with Highway 15 eastward to Ottawa.

Highway 29 was significantly reduced in length during the early 1980s, in order to reduce the redundancy of Highway 15. Highway 29 was truncated at Smiths Falls, while Highway 15 was rerouted along the section of Highway 29 between Carleton Place and Arnprior. This change was approved by the provincial government in 1983, without consulting local governments; signage changes were made in the spring of 1984. This established the route of Highway 29 for the remainder of its existence. As part of a series of budget cuts initiated by premier Mike Harris under his Common Sense Revolution platform in 1995, numerous highways which were no longer significant to the provincial network were decommissioned and responsibility for the routes transferred to a lower level of government, a process referred to as downloading. Highway 29 was downloaded in its entirety on January 1, 1998, and transferred to the United Counties of Leeds and Grenville.

== Major intersections ==
The following table lists the major junctions along Highway 29, as noted by the Ministry of Transportation of Ontario in the 1997 Provincial Highways Distance Table.

Division	Location	km	mi	Destinations	Notes
Brockville		0.00	0.00	Highway 2 (King Street)	
Brockville		0.10	0.062	Courthouse Square / George Street	Highway 29 split into one-way pair; northbound traffic follows Wall Street, southbound traffic follows William Street
Brockville		0.50	0.31	Pearl Street / William Street	End of one-way pair; both directions of Highway 29 follow William Street
Brockville		0.74	0.46	CN Kingston subdivision and Brockville VIA station	Grade-separated; William Street becomes Stewart Boulevard
Brockville		1.86	1.16	Highway 401 – Kingston, Cornwall	Exit 696
Brockville		4.51	2.80	County Road 27 (Centennial Road)	
Leeds and Grenville	Elizabethtown-Kitley	10.27	6.38	County Road 7 (Greenbush Road) – Greenbush	
Leeds and Grenville	Elizabethtown-Kitley	12.00	7.46	County Road 32 (to Graham Lake Road)	Now County Road 46
Leeds and Grenville	Elizabethtown-Kitley	14.15	8.79	County Road 28 – North Augusta	Community of Glen Buell
Leeds and Grenville	Elizabethtown-Kitley	15.34	9.53	Highway 42 – Athens	Now County Road 42; community of Forthton
Leeds and Grenville	Elizabethtown-Kitley	18.34	11.40	County Road 30 (Addison Road)	Community of Addison
Leeds and Grenville	Elizabethtown-Kitley	30.41	18.90	County Road 1 north – Toledo	
Leeds and Grenville	Elizabethtown-Kitley	31.24	19.41	County Road 8 west (Line 6 Road) – Toledo, Lombardy	
Leeds and Grenville	Elizabethtown-Kitley	38.12	23.69	County Road 16 – Jasper	
Smiths Falls		52.29	32.49	Highway 15 south (Lombardy Street); Jasper Avenue	Highway 15 continues north towards Carleton Place
1.000 mi = 1.609 km; 1.000 km = 0.621 mi
