= Ontario Highway 15 =

Ontario provincial highway

Highway 15
- A map of Highway 15; Highway 15 Connecting Links; Highway 15 (1983–1998)

Route information
- Maintained by Ministry of Transportation of Ontario
- Length: 114.7 km (71.3 mi)
- Existed: October 13, 1920–present

Major junctions
- South end: Highway 401 – Kingston
- North end: Highway 7 – Carleton Place

Location
- Country: Canada
- Province: Ontario
- Major cities: Kingston
- Towns: Smiths Falls, Carleton Place

Highway system
- Ontario provincial highways; Current; Former; 400-series
← Highway 12	→ Highway 16
Former provincial highways
← Highway 14

King's Highway 15, commonly referred to as Highway 15, is a provincially maintained highway in the Canadian province of Ontario. It travels north from an interchange with Highway 401 in Kingston to Highway 7 in Carleton Place, a distance of 114.7 kilometres (71.3 mi). In addition to Kingston and Carleton Place, the highway provides access to the Eastern Ontario communities of Joyceville, Seeley's Bay, Morton, Elgin, Crosby, Portland, Lombardy and Franktown. Prior to 1998, Highway 15 continued north from Carleton Place, passed Almonte and through Pakenham, to Highway 17 (now Highway 417) in Arnprior.

Highway 15 was one of the original highways created by the province in 1920 to establish a highway network and qualify for funding under the Canada Highways Act. The southern terminus, originally in Seeley's Bay, was moved to Highway 2 in Kingston the following year. While the northern terminus has shifted numerous times, the southern terminus has consistently remained in Kingston since 1921. Initially, Highway 15 connected Smiths Falls with Carleton Place via Perth. The assignment of the Trans-Canada Highway during the 1950s led to a major renumbering scheme in 1961 that redirected the highway concurrent with Highway 29 via Franktown.

Although realignments and bypasses have been constructed around many of the towns along the route, it continues to serve as a major corridor between Kingston and Ottawa. While the distance between the two is approximately 20 km (12 mi) shorter via Highway 15, Highway 401 and Highway 416 provide a quicker travel time.

== Route description ==
Highway 15 is a 115.4 km (71.7 mi) route that connects Kingston with Carleton Place. A 4.7 km (2.9 mi) segment of the highway, within the town limits of Smiths Falls, is maintained under a Connecting Link agreement. It passes through Frontenac County, the United Counties of Leeds and Grenville and Lanark County along its route through Eastern Ontario. On an average day in 2016, 2,850 vehicles used the highway between Morton and Crosby, while 9,400 vehicles used it south of Carleton Place, the least and most trafficked sections of the route, respectively.

Highway 15 (Beckwith Street) facing north in Smiths Falls

Highway 15 begins at an interchange with Highway 401 (Exit 623) in the city of Kingston; it once continued south to former Highway 2, next to CFB Kingston in Barriefield, but this section is now Kingston Road 15. The route travels northeast alongside the Cataraqui River, slicing through Joyceville and passing Joyceville Institution. Over the next several kilometres, the route travels alongside the Rideau Canal, with Locks 43, 44 and 45 a short drive off the highway. After leaving Frontenac and entering Leeds and Grenville, the route encounters Seeleys Bay, where it curves east and soon meets the northern terminus of former Highway 32. It turns north, then crosses between the municipalities of Leeds and the Thousand Islands and Rideau Lakes at the community of Morton.

After turning northwest and bypassing the community of Elgin, the route encounters the community of Crosby, intersecting former Highway 42 and curving northeast. For the next 30 kilometres (19 mi), the highway travels alongside the Cataraqui Trail, a former Canadian National Railway line donated in 1997 to become a mixed use trail. It passes through the communities of Portland and Lombardy before entering Smiths Falls and Lanark County, where it intersects former Highway 29 and Highway 43 and turns north. The route crosses the Rideau Canal and proceeds towards Carleton Place alongside the Ottawa Valley Railway, bisecting the communities of Franktown, Beckwith and Black's Corners. On the southern outskirts of Carleton Place, Highway 15 ends at an intersection with Highway 7 just west of where it becomes a freeway.

== History ==
=== Provincial highway ===
Original route of Highway 15, circa 1920.

Highway 15 is one of the original provincial highways created by the Department of Public Highways, predecessor to the Ministry of Transportation of Ontario (MTO), in order to qualify for funding under the Canada Highways Act. On October 13, 1920, several dirt roads through the United Counties of Leeds and Grenville and Lanark County, which would later become Highway 15, were designated as part of the rapidly expanding Provincial Highway Network. The route began in the community of Seeley's Bay and followed the current routing north to Smiths Falls. From there it travelled west to Perth, then arced northeast towards Carleton Place. The highway passed through that town and winded towards Ottawa, following roughly the same alignment as Highway 7 does today. The following year, the highway was extended south from Seeley's Bay into Kingston to end at Highway 2.

Initially unnumbered, the route was designated as Highway 15 during the summer of 1925. By that point, the southern terminus was at the present junction of James Street (then Highway 2) and Main Street in Barriefield, north of Fort Henry. The northern segment of Highway 15 – approaching and within Ottawa – changed throughout the years, and varies between maps; most indicate that the intersection of Bank Street and Wellington Street served as the northern terminus of Highways 15, 16, and 31. (Note: Liberal interpretation of various topographic maps, Official road maps, distance tables, and measurements on Google Maps appear to indicate that Bank Street and Wellington Street served as the centre point of Ottawa during the 1930s. Various configurations are shown and thus the routing east of the intersection of Richmond Road and Carling Avenue is ambiguous.) Confederation Square, then known as Connaught Place, was originally planned to serve as the terminus of Ottawa-bound highways when route numbers were posted there in September 1925.

Between Carleton Place and Ottawa, Highway 15 initially followed a circuitous route that served the villages of Ashton and Stittsville. It followed the present-day roads of Highway 7 east from Carleton Place, south on Ashton Station Road to Ormrod Road, then east along Flewellyn Road to Stittsville Main Street. It turned north through Stittsville, onto McCooeye Lane, then east onto Neil Avenue and thence Hazeldean Road. It followed Hazeldean Road as it transitioned to Robertson Road at Eagleson Corners. Entering Ottawa along Robertson Road and Richmond Road, it converged with Highway 17 along Carling Avenue; Highway 16 also became concurrent with the pair east of Preston Street. All three highways continued west to Highway 31 (Bank Street), which they turned onto and followed together north to Wellington Street.

Highway 15 near its southern terminus in Barriefield, circa 1920. This portion was bypassed in 1969 and is now known simply as Main Street.

=== Rerouting ===
Outside of Ottawa, Highway 15 has undergone several significant changes throughout its history. While the southern end has consistently been within Kingston, the segment north of Smiths Falls has shifted several times, notably in 1961 and 1983. Both changes relate to the history of Highway 29 — designated in 1927 to connect Brockville with Ottawa — and the Trans-Canada Highway Act. Highway 29 was discontinuous at first, with a gap between Smiths Falls and Carleton Place; Highway 15 provided the only connection between the two. The gap was removed on August 5, 1936, when the Franktown Road was assumed by the Department of Highways (DHO). Prior to the early 1930s, Highway 7 did not extend east of Peterborough. A depression-relief project to build a new road between Madoc and Perth was completed on August 23, 1932.

Construction of the Carleton Place Bypass began in the spring of 1958, with the aim of rerouting traffic out of the downtown area. Prior to its completion, Highway 15 entered Carleton Place along High Street, turning south onto Bridge Street, and along Moore Street and Franktown Road to the junction with Highway 29. The bypass, which included a bridge over the Mississippi River and an overpass of what is now the Ottawa Valley Railway, was designated as part of Highway 15 on November 19, 1959. It opened several weeks later in early December as an unpaved route. Paving of the bypass took place the following spring.

When the Trans-Canada Highway Act was passed in 1949, Ontario chose to utilise the availed federal funding to create what is now known as the Central Ontario route, via Highway 7. As a result, travel characteristics, and the numbering of Highway 15 between Perth and Ottawa, led to confusion among motorists. The Ottawa Board of Trade petitioned the DHO to renumber several highways surrounding the city to accommodate long-distance travellers. The DHO performed a series of renumberings, similar to those recommendations, following the extension of Highway 43 on September 8, 1961. Highway 15 was rerouted between Smiths Falls and Carleton Place to travel concurrently with Highway 29; Highway 7 was extended along the former routing from Perth to Carleton Place and signed concurrently with Highway 15 eastward to Ottawa, and Highway 43 was routed between Smiths Falls and Perth.

In 1969, a bypass of Barriefield was built, redirecting both Highway 15 and Highway 2 around the historic village. During the early 1980s, Highway 29 was truncated at Smiths Falls, while the Highway 15 designation was retained along the section of Highway 29 between Carleton Place and Arnprior. This change was approved by the provincial government in 1983, without consulting local governments; signage changes were made in the spring of 1984. Highway 15 thereafter remained as the sole route connecting Smiths Falls with Carleton Place, Almonte, and Arnprior.

=== Downloads ===
As part of a series of budget cuts initiated by premier Mike Harris under his Common Sense Revolution platform in 1995, numerous highways deemed to no longer be of significance to the provincial network were decommissioned, and responsibility for the routes transferred to a lower level of government, a process referred to as downloading. The segment of Highway 15 north of Highway 7 was downloaded in its entirety on January 1, 1998, and transferred to the various local governments through which it travelled.

== Major intersections ==
The following table lists the major junctions along Highway 15, as noted by the Ministry of Transportation of Ontario.

Division	Location	km	mi	Destinations	Notes
Kingston		−6.4	−4.0	Road 2	Formerly Highway 2; former southern terminus; former section of Highway 15 follows Kingston Road 15
Kingston		0.0	0.0	Highway 401 – Cornwall, Toronto	Highway 401 exit 623; Highway 15 southern terminus
Kingston		1.4	0.87	Road 21 west (Kingston Mills Road)	
Kingston		11.2	7.0	Road 16 south (Joyceville Road)	
Kingston		13.5	8.4	Road 13 east (Sandhill Road)	
Kingston		17.0	10.6	Road 12 west (Sunbury Road)	
Leeds and Grenville	Leeds and the Thousand Islands	26.3	16.3	County Road 47 east (Main Street)	Seeley's Bay
Leeds and Grenville	Leeds and the Thousand Islands	28.4	17.6	County Road 47 west (Main Street)	Seeley's Bay
Leeds and Grenville	Leeds and the Thousand Islands	30.7	19.1	County Road 32 south – Gananoque	Formerly Highway 32 south
Leeds and Grenville	Leeds and the Thousand Islands	31.8	19.8	County Road 33 north (Lyndhurst Road) – Lyndhurst	
Leeds and Grenville	Rideau Lakes	37.2	23.1	County Road 11 east (Jones Falls Road)	Morton
Leeds and Grenville	Rideau Lakes	45.1	28.0	County Road 8 east (Main Street)	Elgin
Leeds and Grenville	Rideau Lakes	48.4	30.1	County Road 9 west (Chaffey's Lock Road)	
Leeds and Grenville	Rideau Lakes	51.5	32.0	County Road 42 – Newboro, Westport, Athens	Crosby; formerly Highway 42; to County Road 14 (Narrows Lock Road)
Leeds and Grenville	Rideau Lakes	66.4	41.3	County Road 5 south	
Leeds and Grenville	Rideau Lakes	66.4	41.3	County Road 38 north (Briton-Houghton Bay Road)	
Leeds and Grenville	Rideau Lakes	74.6	46.4	County Road 1 north (Rideau Ferry Road)	Lombardy
Leeds and Grenville	Rideau Lakes	74.8	46.5	County Road 1 south (Anglican Church Road)	Lombardy
Smiths Falls		83.9	52.1		Beginning of Smiths Falls Connecting Link Agreement
Smiths Falls		85.1	52.9	Brockville Street Jasper Avenue	Formerly Highway 29 south; to County Road 17 south / County Road 29
Smiths Falls		86.0	53.4	Elmsley Street	Formerly Highway 43 east; former southern end of Highway 43 concurrency; to County Road 43 east
Smiths Falls		86.4	53.7	Cornelia Street W	Formerly Highway 43 west; former northern end of Highway 43 concurrency; to County Road 43 west
Smiths Falls		87.0	54.1	Cornelia Street E	To County Road 4 east (Cornelia Street East)
Smiths Falls		88.6	55.1		End of Smiths Falls Connecting Link Agreement
Lanark	Beckwith	101.8	63.3	County Road 10 west (Perth Road)	Franktown
Lanark	Beckwith	102.8	63.9	County Road 10 east (Richmond Road)	Franktown
Lanark	Carleton Place	114.7	71.3	Highway 7 east / TCH – Peterborough, Perth	Northern terminus; former beginning of former Highway 7 concurrency; section of Highway 7 from Perth to Ottawa was formerly Highway 15 before the 1960s
Lanark	Carleton Place	115.3	71.6	Lanark County Road 29 begins Highway 7 east / TCH – Ottawa	Former end of former Highway 7 concurrency; former Highway 15 follows County Road 29
Lanark	Carleton Place	118.0	73.3	County Road 7B west (Townline Road)	Formerly Highway 7B west
Lanark	Mississippi Mills	128.1	79.6	County Road 16 west (Wolf Grove Road); County Road 49 east (Almonte Street)	Almonte; formerly Highway 44 east
Lanark–Ottawa boundary	Mississippi Mills–Ottawa boundary	147.5– 150.1	91.7– 93.3	Lanark County Road 29 ends Ottawa Road 29 begins	Lanark County Road 29 / Ottawa Road 29 concurrency for 2.6 km (1.6 mi)
Ottawa		154.2	95.8	Highway 17 / TCH – Ottawa, Pembroke Road 29 north – Arnprior	Former northern terminus; now Highway 417 exit 180; former actual northern terminus location was relocated to Road 29 when Highway 417 was constructed in 2004
1.000 mi = 1.609 km; 1.000 km = 0.621 mi: Closed/former
