= List of former Ontario provincial highways =

Decommissioned Ontario provincial highways

King's Highway Shield Design used from 1960 to 1993.

The Canadian province of Ontario has an extensive network of Primary (King's), Secondary, and Tertiary Highways, with county-level and city-level roads linking between them. Over the years, however, Ontario has turned back numerous highways to municipal government bodies, renumbered them, or upgraded them to 400-series highways.

In 1997 and 1998, many sections of the provincial highway network were downloaded to local municipalities (such as cities, counties or regional municipalities) by the Ontario Ministry of Transportation as a cost-saving measure. While highways were occasionally transferred to local governments in the past, the 1997–1998 downloads represented the most significant changes to Ontario's highway network. Many highways were completely devolved, while of others only short sections remain under provincial jurisdiction (Highway 2, once stretching across Southern Ontario, now is only a few kilometres long). Below is a partial list of partially or wholly devolved highways since 1997.

== King's highways ==
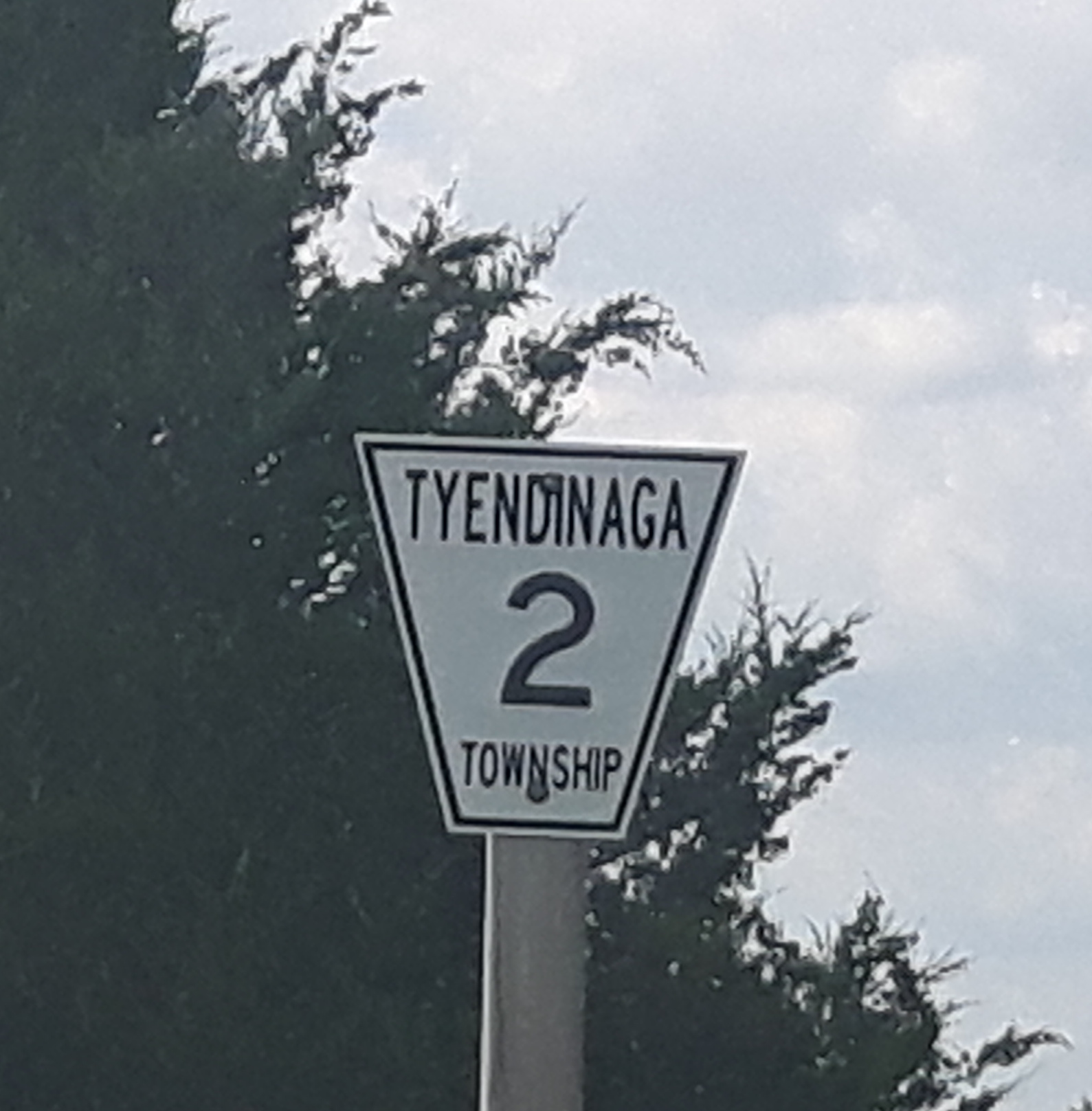
Township road shield along former Highway 2 in Tyendinaga Township, Hastings County. Much of Highway 2 has been replaced by identically numbered county or municipal routes.

- Highway 2 – Windsor to the Ontario-Quebec boundary, now Lake Shore Boulevard, Kingston Road, Toronto Road, Dundas Street, and Loyalist Road. Its purpose was largely superseded by Highway 401 and 403; only a 1.1-kilometre section near Gananoque remains.
- Highway 2A

- Scarborough, Ontario – Was once an expressway in the 1940s until Highway 401 took over most of its current route in 1952.
- Windsor – Tilbury – Designated in 1929, renumbered to Highway 98 in 1938.
- London, Ontario – Paralleled Highway 2 through the downtown core of London. It was established in 1956 and decommissioned in 1968.
- Cornwall, Ontario – Bypassed the Seaway International Bridge. It was established in 1965 and decommissioned on 1967.

- Highway 2B – Formerly Ontario Highway 2A in Chatham, Ontario from 1961 to 1970; decommissioned and route reverted to local street names (Richmond Street, Queen Street, School Street, 5th Street and Thames Street)
- Highway 2S
- Highway 3 – between St. Thomas and Leamington and within the urban areas of Port Colborne and Fort Erie.
- Highway 3A
  - A section of Ontario Highway 3 between Chambers Corners and Niagara Falls
  - A designation of Ontario Highway 3B in Windsor
- Highway 3B
- Highway 3C
- Highway 4 – Downgraded portions: south of Highway 3 in Talbotville Royal, and north/east of Highway 8
- Highway 4A
- Highway 4B
- Highway 5 – Downgraded all of the Paris-Scarborough route except one 12.7 km section between Ontario Highway 8 and Ontario Highway 6
- Highway 5A
- Highway 5B
- Highway 6 – Downgraded portions: south/west of Port Dover
- Highway 6A
- Highway 7 – Downgraded the portion in York Region west of Donald Cousens Parkway / York Regional Road 48.
- Highway 7A
- Highway 7B – Highway 7 west of Carleton Place to Highway 15 in Carleton Place.
- Highway 8 – From Winona to Niagara Falls, and, more recently, from Peters Corners to Winona.
- Highway 8A
- Highway 8B
- Highway 8D
- Highway 9 – Split into two segments in Orangeville area and eastern end cut past Highway 400 towards Newmarket due to downgrading of various portions.
- Highway 9A
- Highway 10 – Hurontario Street in Mississauga and Main Street in Brampton were formerly part of this route, but lost the designation with the completion of Highway 410 through the area. The Highway 10 designation is still in use north of Brampton.
- Highway 10B
- Highway 11 – from Barrie southward; Now known as Yonge Street, York County Road 1, and Simcoe County Road 4.
- Highway 11A – Toronto; Gardiner Expressway/Lake Shore Boulevard to Highway 401. Now known only as York Street, University Avenue, Avenue Road, and Oriole Parkway.
- Highway 11B – Cobalt-New Liskeard. Portions of the road in Coleman Township are still signed as 11B.
- Highway 12 – Whitby—south of Highway 407 right-of-way.
- Highway 12A
- Highway 12B
- Highway 14 – Marmora to Highway 62 near Foxboro, the 14 numbering originally continued south (on what is now Highway 62) to Picton. Only one of the *15 Ontario highways (2–17 with 13 skipped) to be completely dropped from the system.
- Highway 15 – From CFB Kingston to Highway 401, now Kingston Road 15, and from Carleton Place to Arnprior, now Lanark County Road 29 and Ottawa Road 29.
- Highway 15A
- Highway 15B – Highway 15 west of Carleton Place to Highway 29 in Carleton Place. Renumbered as Highway 7B in 1961.
- Highway 16 – Upgraded to a 400 series highway (Highway 416). Only exists as a short connector highway between Highway 416 north of Highway 401 and Leeds & Grenville County Road 2 (formerly Highway 2). The section north of North Gower, which is different from the original route, is designated Ottawa Road 73 (Prince of Wales Drive).
- Highway 17 – Replaced by Highway 417 south and east of Arnprior to the Ontario/Quebec border.
- Highway 17A
- Highway 17B
- Highway 18 – From Windsor to Leamington, now Essex County Road 20
- Highway 18A
- Highway 18B
- Highway 19 – From terminus at Port Burwell to Highway 3 in Tillsonburg; from Highway 401 to terminus at Highway 86 near Milverton. The section from Tillsonburg to Highway 401 remains.
- Highway 20 – From QEW exit 88 east of Hamilton to Highway 58 near Allanburg and from Thorold Townline Road to Niagara Falls, now Regional Road 20 (Confederation Parkway through Stoney Creek, Rymal Road, and Lundy's Lane); only a 1.9-kilometre section near Allanburg remains.
- Highway 20A
- Highway 21 – Portions South of Highway 402
- Highway 21A
- Highway 22 – London, Ontario to near Warwick, Ontario, connecting to Sarnia, Ontario and to Arkona by Highway 7; replaced by most of routing of Highway 402
- Highway 22A
- Highway 23 – Portion between Highway 89 in Palmerston to the Highway 9 Junction at Teviotdale downloaded; rerouted over section of Highway 89 in 2003
- Highway 24 – 2 km south of Cambridge and northward through Guelph, Orangeville, Shelburne, and Collingwood on Georgian Bay.
- Highway 24A
- Highway 24B
- Highway 24T
- Highway 25 – Now Bronte Road (south of Ontario Highway 407 in Oakville), Ontario St/Steeles Ave/Martin St/Halton Regional Rd 25 in Milton, Halton Regional Rd 25 in Halton Hills, and Main Street in Acton. Continues in segments through Wellington & Dufferin Counties to north of Grand Valley at Highway 89.
- Highway 27 – Etobicoke to Midhurst; now referred to as Highway 27 in Toronto, York Regional Road 27 in Vaughan, and Simcoe County Road 27 in Simcoe County
- Highway 28 – Port Hope to Highway 7A, (which had a concurrency with Highway 115 for 13 km to the Parkway exit), up to NE of Lakefield, at Highway 134.
- Highway 28A
- Highway 28B
- Highway 29 – Brockville to Arnprior. The section from Smiths Falls to Carleton Place is now Highway 15; the rest was demoted as County Road 29.
- Highway 30 – Brighton to Havelock
- Highway 31 – Morrisburg to Ottawa
- Highway 32 – Gananoque to Highway 15, near Seeleys Bay; now referred to as Leeds and Grenville County Road 32
- Highway 33 – Trenton to Picton; the portion east of Collins Bay Road in Kingston, Ontario was also removed from the provincial system
- Highway 34 – Lancaster to Hawkesbury
- Highway 35 – Portion between Highway 401 and Highway 115 interchange in the Regional Municipality of Durham. Was concurrent with and is now part of Highway 115.
- Highway 35A
- Highway 35B
- Highway 36 – Lindsay to Highway 28 at Burleigh Falls. Now referred to as Kawartha Lakes Road 36.
- Highway 36B
- Highway 37B
- Highway 38 – Kingston to Highway 7 near Sharbot Lake; now referred to as Kingston, South Frontenac and Central Frontenac Road 38
- Highway 39 – Windsor to south of Belle River. (1934–1970. Now Essex County Road 22 from Essex County Road 42 to Essex County Road 2, and Essex County Road 2 into Windsor. Rendered obsolete with the completion of E.C. Row Expressway in 1970, and was absorbed into Highway 2.
- Highway 39B
- Highway 40A
- Highway 40B
- Highway 40C
- Highway 41 – Portion between Highway 2 and Highway 7 downgraded as Lennox and Addington County Road 41.
- Highway 41B
- Highway 42 – Entirely downgraded, Westport to Forthton.
- Highway 43 – Entirely downgraded. Perth to Alexandria, via Smiths Falls, and Winchester deleted in 1998—Perth to Smith Falls section had been part of Ontario Highway 15 prior to renumbering of the Perth-Carleton Place-Kanata portion of 15's route as Highway 7 in 1961.
- Highway 43B
- Highway 44 – Between Lanark County Road 29 (formerly Highway 15) in Almonte, Ontario and Donald B. Munro Drive (formerly Highway 17) west of Carp, Ontario (1938–1997). Now Ottawa Road 49 (March Road).
- Highway 45 – Between Northumberland County Road 2 (formerly Highway 2) in Cobourg and Highway 7 in Norwood. Now known as Northumberland County Road 45 and Peterborough County Road 45.
- Highway 46 – Between Highway 7 and Kawartha Lakes Road 48 (formerly Highway 48) near Bolsover. Now Kawartha Lakes Road 46.
- Highway 47 – Highway 48 north of Stouffville to Highways 7 & 12 south of Greenbank.
- Highway 48 – Between Kingston Road and York Regional Road 25.
- Highway 48B
- Highway 49 – Between Picton and the Quinte Skyway Bridge.
- Highway 50 – Toronto section; also referred to as Albion Road to Highway 89 west of Alliston.
- Highway 51 – Ran from Highway 3 in Eatonville to Rondeau Provincial Park Entrance.
- Highway 52 – East of Alberton to Highway 8 at Peters Corners.
- Highway 52B
- Highway 53 – Highway 20 in Stoney Creek to Eastwood.
- Highway 54 – Cayuga to Cainsville.
- Highway 55 – Now Niagara Regional Road 55.
- Highway 56 – Highway 3 west of Canfield to Stoney Creek.
- Highway 57 – Bismarck to Becketts Bridge. Deleted in 1970.
- Highway 58 – From Highway 58A in Welland to Highway 406 between Turner's Corners and Allanburg.
- Highway 59 – Transferred in its entirety to the counties of Norfolk, Oxford and Perth.
- Highway 61B
- Highway 62A
- Highway 67A
- Highway 68 – became Highway 6 on Manitoulin Island.
- Highway 69 – replaced by Highway 400 south of MacTier. Highway's length continues to shrink with extension of Highway 400 to Sudbury, and the number will disappear entirely in the future.
- Highway 69B
- Highway 70 – renamed Highway 6 from Hepworth to Springmount.
- Highway 72A
- Highway 73 – Port Bruce to Dorchester
- Highway 74 – New Sarum to Nilestown. Deleted in 1997.
- Highway 75 – Proposed in 1970 from Canborough to Bismarck (never built).
- Highway 76 – Highway 3 in Eagle to Highway 2 northeast of Wardsville.
- Highway 78 – Wallaceburg to Dresden.
- Highway 79 – Highway 2 south of Bothwell to Port Franks.
- Highway 79A
- Highway 80 – Courtright to Strathburn.
- Highway 80B
- Highway 81 – Highway 2 west of Delaware to Grand Bend.
- Highway 82 – Highway 7 south of Thedford to Port Franks. Became part of Highway 79 in 1982.
- Highway 83 – Ontario Highway 21 near Grand Bend to Ontario Highway 23 in Russeldale.
- Highway 84 – St. Joseph to Hensall.
- Highway 85 – Became part of Highway 86 in 1981; Waterloo to Elmira was downloaded in 1998, remaining section of Highway 86 renumbered back to Highway 85.
- Highway 86 – Original section from Elmira to Amberley downloaded in 1998; rest downloaded or became Highway 85.
- Highway 86B
- Highway 87 – Bluevale to Harriston.
- Highway 88 – Ontario Highway 27 junction at Bond Head to Highway 11 junction in Bradford. Existed from 1938 to 1998. Renamed as Simcoe County Road 88.
- Highway 89 – Eastern end truncated at Ontario Highway 400 (original terminus was Ontario Highway 11)
- Highway 90 – Barrie to Angus and CFB Borden.
- Highway 91 – Duntroon to Stayner.
- Highway 92 – Wasaga Beach to Elmvale
- Highway 93 – South of Highway 400 interchange
- Highway 95 – Wolfe Island
- Highway 96 – Wolfe Island
- Highway 97 – Freelton to Hickson, through Galt/Cambridge.
- Highway 98 – Essex County 1938–1970. It was deleted, becoming Essex County Road 46, and Kent County (now Chatham-Kent) Road 8. Its western terminus was downtown Windsor, and its eastern terminus was downtown Blenheim, at Highways 40 and 3. Rendered obsolete with the completion of nearby freeway, Highway 401 (which paralleled Ontario Highway 98 for the majority of its length).
- Highway 98A
- Highway 98B
- Highway 99 – Governor's Road (original alignment of Dundas Street from Highway 24 North of Brantford to Ancaster
- Highway 100 – Ran from MCF (ON-401) at exit 194 to Former ON-2, eastern part of London, now Veterans Memorial Parkway.
- Highway 103 – Highway 400 and 12 to Highway 69 junction, first the original alignment of Highway 69, now Highway 400.
- Highway 104 – to Grand Valley from Ontario Highway 9, then Ontario Highway 25 .
- Highway 106 – Welcome to Highway 28 north of Port Hope. Now Northumberland Road 74.
- Highway 107 – Highway 18 in Ruthven, Ontario, to Highway 3 in Ruthven. Now Essex County Road 45.
- Highway 109 – Hwy 500 east of Tory Hill to Paudash. Became part of Highway 121 in 1964.
- Highway 110 – Highway 15 west of Carleton Place to Highway 29 in Carleton Place. Renumbered as Highway 15B in 1960.
- Highway 111 – Hwy 500 south of Highland Grove to Dyno Mines. Renumbered Secondary Highway 648 in 1964.
- Highway 114 – Highway 3 (Former alignment, now Essex County Road 34) in Maidstone, Ontario (now a part of Tecumseh, Ontario, to Highway 98 (Now Essex County Road 46). Part of road is still signed as "Old HWY 114" from Manning Road (Essex County Road 19) to Provincial Road (Essex County Road 46).
- Highway 116 – Hudson to Highway 72 in Patricia.
- Highway 117 – Highway 11 north of Bracebridge to Dorset.
- Highway 118 – Western end truncated at Ontario Highway 11 (original terminus was Ontario Highway 169)
- Highway 119 – Highway 17 west of Dryden to Richan. Renumbered Secondary Highway 665 in 1974.
- Highway 120 – Highway 622 in Atikokan to Highway 17 Shabaqua Corners. Renumbered as part of Highway 11 in 1960.
- Highway 121 – Highway 35 south of Fenelon Falls to Haliburton. Eastward is renamed Highway 118.
- Highway 122 – QEW in Oakville to QEW in Mississauga. Decommissioned in 1970.
- Highway 123 – Now Airport Road in North Bay, Ontario.
- Highway 126 – MacDonald-Cartier Freeway (Highway 401) in the south end of London, Ontario (partially superhighway—Wenige Expressway) to Highway 2, some think extended to Highway 22 (present Fanshawe Park Road East), now known as Highbury Avenue. (The part between Highway 401 and the south Thames River had no name, while a half-mile section from the Thames to Hamilton Road was the Wenige Expwy, and north from there was Highbury Avenue.)
- Highway 128 – Highway 17 in Kenora to Redditt. Renumbered Secondary Highway 666 (now 658) in 1974.
- Highway 131 – Renamed Simcoe County Road 27.
- Highway 133 – Renamed Lennox and Addington County Road 4.
- Highway 134 – Renamed Highway 28 when that road was re-routed and fully absorbed Highway 134.
- Highway 135 – Short highway in London, between Highway 401 and former Highways 2 & 4. Now called Exeter Road.
- Highway 136 – Cataract to Orangeville. Formerly Highway 24.
- Highway 148 – Highway 17 to Pembroke, Ontario city limits was decommissioned, now just a connecting link (which allows it to still be signed as Highway 148). Continuation of Quebec route 148.
- Highway 169 – Brechin to Foote's Bay via Gravenhurst, shared space with Highway 11 from Washago to Gravenhurst.
- Queen Elizabeth Way – Highway 427 to Lake Shore Blvd. (former Highway 2). This section is now known as the Gardiner Expressway, which is owned by the City of Toronto.
- Highway 400A

== Secondary highways ==
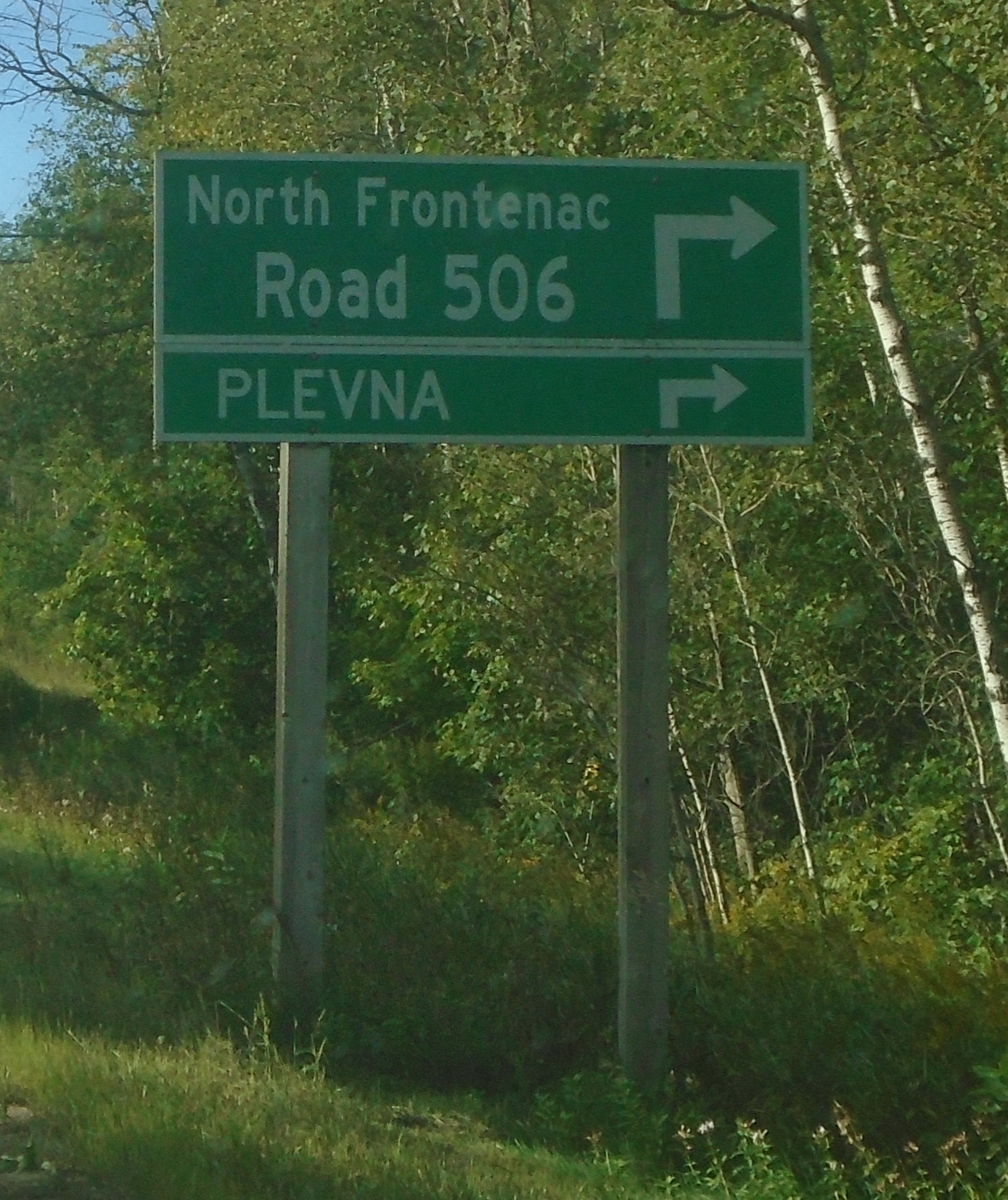
Former Secondary Highway 506, now signed North Frontenac Road 506 as it is under township jurisdiction in North Frontenac Township

- Highway 500 –
- Highway 501 –
- Highway 503 – Between Highway 48 in Kirkfield and Highway 121 in Tory Hill. Now Kawartha Lakes Road 6, Kawartha Lakes Road 45, Peterborough County Road 503 and Haliburton County Road 503.
- Highway 504 –
- Highway 505 –
- Highway 506 – Highway 41 to Plevna. Now known as North Frontenac Road 506. Continues east/south as North Frontenac Road 509.
- Highway 507 – Between Highway 28 in Lakefield and Highway 503 in Gooderham. Now Peterborough County Road 23, Peterborough County Road 36, Peterborough County Road 507 and Haliburton County Road 507.
- Highway 508 – Highway 17 west of Arnprior to Calabogie. Entirely downloaded to Renfrew County.
- Highway 509 – Highway 7 to Plevna. Now known as Central Frontenac and North Frontenac Road 509. Continues west as North Frontenac Road 506.
- Highway 511 – Perth to Calabogie. Entirely downloaded to Lanark and Renfrew counties.
- Highway 512 –
- Highway 513 –
- Highway 514 –
- Highway 515 –
- Highway 517 – Used to run from Boulter to Combermere at Highway 62. Downgraded to county road status in Hastings and Renfrew counties.
- Highway 521 –
- Highway 536 – Passes by the ghost town of Creighton Mine near the town of Lively in Greater Sudbury. Redesignated as Municipal Road 24.
- Highway 537 – Wanup to Wahnapitae in Greater Sudbury. Partially redesignated as Municipal Road 537.
- Highway 541 – New Sudbury, Garson and Skead. Redesignated as Municipal Road 86.
- Highway 543 – Highway 69 to Dew Drop Road in Sudbury. Downloaded in 1973 upon the creation of the Regional Municipality of Sudbury as Long Lake Road, part of Regional Road 80. Now designated Greater Sudbury Municipal Road 80.
- Highway 544 – Downtown Sudbury to Cartier. Redesignated as Highway 144 in 1965, as extension to Timmins was under construction.
- Highway 545 – Hanmer, Capreol and Selwood. Redesignated as Municipal Road 84.
- Highway 549 – Whitefish to Lake Panache in the town of Walden; downloaded in mid-1980s and now designated as Greater Sudbury Municipal Road 10.
- Boulter Road was an un-numbered secondary highway from at least the 1930s. It was downloaded in 1998, with its more-well-known brother road, Highway 517.
- Highway 550B – Sault Ste. Marie business route linking Highway 550 with the Sault Ste. Marie International Bridge. Returned to original city street names when Ontario decommissioned most B-series highways.
- Highway 552A –
- Highway 555 – Highway 557 north of Blind River to Granary Lake. Downloaded in 1997.
- Highway 604 –
- Highway 604A – Became part of Highway 604 in 1964.
- Highway 606 –
- Highway 610 –
- Highway 616 –
- Highway 620 – Peterborough County route linking Highway 28 to Highway 62, entirely downloaded in 1997 to Peterborough and Hastings County
- Highway 620A –
- Highway 626 –
- Highway 629 –
- Highway 635 – Rolphton to Rapides-des-Joachims, Quebec. Interprovincial crossing downloaded to Renfrew County.
- Highway 640 – Highway 571 to Earlton Airport. Transferred to township of Armstrong in 2004; now Airport Road.
- Highway 644 – Highway 69 to Pointe-au-Baril. Given to The Archipelago in 2006; now South Shore Road.
- Highway 646 – Linking Highway 599 with sites in the township of Pickle Lake. Now identified on signage as Pickle Lake Road.
- Highway 648 – Circular road that started and ended at Highway 121 (present-day Highway 118) in Haliburton County; now Loop Road.
- Highway 649 –
- Highway 653 – Chenaux Road. Interprovincial crossing to Portage-du-Fort, Quebec; downloaded to Renfrew County.
- Highway 658 – Section from Highway 17A to Highway 17 downloaded in 1997; now Veterans Drive.
- Highway 659 –
- Highway 660 –
- Highway 662 –
- Highway 666 – Renumbered Highway 658 in 1985.

== Tertiary roads ==
- Highway 800 - Not currently assigned. Became Highway 527 in 1976.
- Highway 801 - Highway 11 to Namewaminikan River
- Highway 803 - Not currently assigned. Became Highway 101 to Nighthawk Lake in 1997.
- Highway 806 - Not currently assigned. Became Highway 545 in 1973.
- Highway 807 - Not currently assigned. Became Highway 622 in 1989.
- Highway 808 - Not currently assigned. From Highway 599 in Central Patricia to Otoskwin River Bridge. Previously an extension of Highway 599. Decommissioned in 1983.
- Highway 809 - Decommissioned road near Boston Creek
- Highway 812 - Not currently assigned. Became Highway 502 in 1981.
- Highway 813 - Decommissioned road near Sturgeon Falls (identified as Riding Stable Road)

== Recycling ==
Highway numbers have even been "recycled" (used more than once on a provincial highway), however the use tends to be as far as possible from the original routing, and generally a few decades' time separate each numbering, to minimize confusion.

King's Highways

- Ontario Highway 49 – Originally Hwy 50 south of Bolton to Kleinburg. Deleted in 1961.
- Ontario Highway 51 – Originally ran from Coulterville to Caledon. Became part of Highway 24 in 1961.
- Ontario Highway 55 – Originally ran from Highway 53 to the QEW in Hamilton. Deleted in 1961.
- Ontario Highway 70 – Originally ran from Highway 71 West of Emo to Highway 17 in Longbow Corner. Became part of Highway 71 in 1961.
- Highway 70A –
- Ontario Highway 75 – Originally ran from Highway 3 in Wallacetown to Dutton. Deleted in 1957.
- Ontario Highway 77 – Originally ran from Highway 3 in New Glasgow to Rodney. Deleted in 1957.
- Ontario Highway 100 – Originally ran from Thamesford to St. Mary's; became part of Highway 19 in 1962.
- Ontario Highway 102 – Was originally assigned to Canada's first divided highway, now known as Cootes Drive. It bypassed western Hamilton, from McMaster University to Dundas. Now assigned to the Dawson Road bypass of Thunder Bay.
- Ontario Highway 108 – Originally The Queensway, Hwy 27 in Etobicoke to QEW in Toronto. Deleted in 1954.
- Ontario Highway 109 – Formerly Eglinton Avenue East, Scarborough. Deleted in 1954. Reassigned to a highway in Cardiff, Ontario which has now been renumbered.
- Ontario Highway 117 – Originally Bathurst Street, Toronto from Steeles Avenue to Highway 7. Deleted in 1970.
- Ontario Highway 123 – Original route ran from Highway 3 to St. Thomas. Deleted in 1957.
- Ontario Highway 126 – Originally Highway 36 at Bobcaygeon to Highway 35 south of Minden (became part of Highway 121).
- Ontario Highway 131 – Was originally assigned to Harbour Expressway from Highway 11 & Highway 17 to downtown Thunder Bay. Deleted in 1981.
- Ontario Highway 133 – Originally Highway 28 to Fowlers Corners (became part of Highway 7).
- Ontario Highway 134 – Originally Highway 41 to Pembroke (became part of Highway 41).

Secondary highways

- Ontario Highway 502 – Formerly the Belleville Road between Marysville, Hastings County, Ontario and Napanee, bypassing the Ontario Highway 2 segment through Deseronto, Ontario. Reassigned and currently in use in Northern Ontario.
- Ontario Highway 514
- Ontario Highway 516
- Ontario Highway 519
- Ontario Highway 525
- Ontario Highway 527
- Ontario Highway 532
- Ontario Highway 547
- Ontario Highway 559
- Ontario Highway 575
- Ontario Highway 612
- Ontario Highway 623
- Ontario Highway 624
- Ontario Highway 626
- Ontario Highway 634 – Chelmsford to Val Caron. Redesignated as Regional Road 15 by the Regional Municipality of Sudbury in the early 1970s and is now designated Municipal Road 15 in present-day Greater Sudbury. A different unrelated Highway 634 is now located in Smooth Rock Falls, which was the former Highway 807.
- Ontario Highway 658 – Victoria Mine (ghost town) near Worthington. Redesignated as Municipal Road 4. Number was later revived on a different highway near Kenora.
- Highway 807 – Fraserdale to Highway 11 at Smooth Rock Falls. Redesignated as Highway 634 in 1977. See Highway 634, an unrelated highway known today as municipal road 15 located in Greater Sudbury.
