= List of numbered roads in Leeds and Grenville United Counties =

This is a list of numbered roads in the United Counties of Leeds and Grenville, Ontario.

County Road #	Local name(s)	Southern/Western Terminus	Northern/Eastern Terminus	Settlements served	Additional Notes
Leeds and Grenville County Road 1	County Road 1 Kitley/South Elmsley Townline Road; Anglican Church Road; Rideau Ferry Road	County Road 29	County Road 1 At the Rideau Canal, Continuation into Lanark County	Toledo, Lombardy, Rideau Ferry	
Leeds and Grenville County Road 2	County Road 2	East Segment: Highway 2 in Gananoque West Segment: Road 2 into Kingston	East Segment: County Road 2 into South Dundas West Segment: Highway 2 in Gananoque	Gananoque, Legge, Ebenezer, Escott, Sherwood Springs, Brockville, Maitland, Blue Church, Prescott, Wexford, Johnstown, Cardinal	formerly Highway 2 running from Windsor to the Ontario-Quebec border; a.k.a. King Street in Gananoque, King Street in Brockville, and King Street in Prescott; not to be confused with Highway 2 between Gananoque's eastern town limits and Highway 401
Leeds and Grenville County Road 3	Reynolds Road; Prince Street; Outlet Road; Bryan Road	Thousand Islands Parkway	County Road 33	Selton, Lansdowne, Dulcemaine, Outlet, Long Point	
Leeds and Grenville County Road 4	Warburton Road; Blue Mountain Road; Rockfield Road; Sly Road; Quabbin Road	County Road 3	County Road 2	Warburton, Rockfield, Quabbin, Mallorytown	
Leeds and Grenville County Road 5	Mallorytown Road; County Road 5	Thousand Islands Parkway	Highway 15	Mallorytown Landing, Caintown, McIntosh Mills, Athens, Plum Hollow, Newboyne	a.k.a. Mill Street, Main Street and Elgin Street in Athens
Leeds and Grenville County Road 6	North Augusta Road	County Road 26	County Road 15	Rows Corners, Manhard, North Augusta	
Leeds and Grenville County Road 7	Greenbush Road; County Road 7	County Road 29	County Road 16	Greenbush, Rocksprings, Crystal	
Leeds and Grenville County Road 8	Main Street; Toledo Road; Line 6 Road	Highway 15	County Road 29	Elgin, Phillipsville, Bellamys Mills, Toledo	
Leeds and Grenville County Road 9	Chaffeys Lock Road	Rideau Canal at Chaffey's Lock (Continues as Opinicon Road into South Frontenac)	Highway 15	Chaffeys Lock	
Leeds and Grenville County Road 10	Perth Road	Continuation into Frontenac County Township Road 10	Continuation into Lanark County County Road 10	Blairs Settlement, Westport	
Leeds and Grenville County Road 11	Jones Falls Road	Continuation into South Frontenac Township Road 11	Highway 15	Jones Falls	
Leeds and Grenville County Road 12	Salem Road	Wolfe Lake Road / Township Road 8	County Road 10	Salem, Westport	
Leeds and Grenville County Road 13	South Lake Road	Road 13 at Kingston City Limits	County Road 32	Springfield	
Leeds and Grenville County Road 14	Narrows Lock road	County Road 42	Rideau Canal / Continuation into Lanark County County Road 14	Crosby, Narrows Lock	
Leeds and Grenville County Road 15	Church Street; County Road 15; Reid Street	County Road 2	County Road 43 Highway 43 at Lanark County	Maitland, Stones Corners, North Augusta, Wolford Centre, Hemlock Corners, Merrickville	Runs concurrent with County Road 43 in Merrickville until Lanark County Line
Leeds and Grenville County Road 16	County Road 16	County Road 29	County Road 15	Jasper, Eastons Corners	not to be confused with Highway 16
Leeds and Grenville County Road 17	Jasper Road	County Road 16 in Jasper	Jaspar Avenue in Smiths Falls	Jasper	
Leeds and Grenville County Road 18	County Road 18; Clothier Street	Highway 401 Edward Street N Prescott	County Road 44 Clothier Street W, Kemptville	Sparkle City, Roebuck, McRoberts Corner, Bishops Mills, Hutchins Corners, Kemptville	
Leeds and Grenville County Road 19	Rideau River Road	County Road 24	Road 19 in Ottawa	Kemptville, Besley Woods	
Leeds and Grenville County Road 20	Oxford Station Road; Town Line Road; Slater Road; Dillabaugh Road	County Road 18	County Road 3 in Dundas	East Oxford, Oxford Station, Millars Corners, Heckston	
Leeds and Grenville County Road 21	County Road 21	County Road 15	County Road 18 in Dundas	Throoptown, Roebuck, Spencerville, Shanly	
Leeds and Grenville County Road 22	County Road 22; Gower Drive Shanly Road	County Road 2	County Road 19	Cardinal, Brouseville, Pittston, Shanly, Heckston, Pelton Corner	
Leeds and Grenville County Road 23	River Road; Burritts Rapids Road	County Road 43	County Road 43	Burritts Rapids	
Leeds and Grenville County Road 24	Vanburen Street	Prescott Street, Kemptville	County Road 43	Kemptville	
Leeds and Grenville County Road 25	Guy Road	County Road 18	County Road 43	Swan Crossing	
Leeds and Grenville County Road 26	3rd Concession Road	County Road 6	County Road 18	Rows Corners, Bethel, Stones Corners, Maynard	
Leeds and Grenville County Road 27	Yonge Mills Road; Main Street; Centennial Road	County Road 2	County Road 29	Yonge Mills, Lyn	
Leeds and Grenville County Road 28	County Road 28	County Road 29	County Road 6	Glen Buell, New Dublin, Bellamys	
Leeds and Grenville County Road 29	County Road 29	William Street in Brockville	County Road 29 in Lanark County, Smiths Falls	Tincap, Glen Bluell, Forthton, Addison, Lehighs Corners, Frankville, Toledo, Newbliss, Shanes	formerly Highway 29 running from Brockville to Arnprior
Leeds and Grenville County Road 30	Addison Road	County Road 42	County Road 29	Anoma Lea, Addison	
Leeds and Grenville County Road 31	Blue Church Road	County Road 2	County Road 26	Blue Church	
Leeds and Grenville County Road 32	Stone Street; County Road 32	County Road 2	Highway 15;	Gananoque, Cheeseborough, Taylor, Berrytown	formerly Highway 32
Leeds and Grenville County Road 33	Lyndhurst Road	Highway 15	County Road 42	Sweets Corners, Lyndhurst	
Leeds and Grenville County Road 34	Hiscocks Road; Eden Grove Road	County Road 2	County Road 3	Emery, Eden Grove, Lansdowne	
Leeds and Grenville County Road 35	Station Road	County Road 32	County Road 34	Gananoque Junction	
Leeds and Grenville County Road 36	Mountain Road	County Road 12	Continuation into Lanark County County Road 36	Westport	
Leeds and Grenville County Road 37	Howe Island Ferry Road	Howe Island Ferry to Township Road 22 in Frontenac Islands	County Road 2	The Howe Island ferry wharf	
Leeds and Grenville County Road 38	Briton-Houghton Bay Road	Highway 15	Willis Wharf, Dead End at R25	Mill Pond, Big Rideau Lake	
Leeds and Grenville County Road 39	County Park Road	Sand Bay County Park	County Road 40	Charleston	
Leeds and Grenville County Road 40	King Street; Charleston Road; Elgin Street South	County Road 39 at Charleston	County Road 5 County Road 42 Main Street W in Athens	Charleston, Glen Morris, Athens	
Leeds and Grenville County Road 41	County Road 41	County Road 15	County Road 16	Hemlock Corners	
Leeds and Grenville County Road 42	County Road 42	County Road 12	County Road 29	Westport, Newboro, Crosby, Forfar, Philipsville, Delta, Soperton, Athens, Glen Elbe, Forthton	formerly Highway 42; a.k.a. Main Street in Athens, King Street in Delta and Drummond Street in Newboro
Leeds and Grenville County Road 43	County Road 43	County Road 15 Highway 43 in Merrickville	Continuation into Dundas as County Road 43	Merrickville, Actons Corners, Kemptville	formerly Highway 43 running from Perth east to Alexandria
Leeds and Grenville County Road 44	County Road 44	Highway 16	Merlyn Wilson Road in Ottawa towards Road 5	Crystal Rock, Glen Smail, Spencerville, Groveton, Van Allens, Kemptville	Former alignment of Highway 16 prior to the construction of Highway 16 New/ Highway 416 in the 1990s; a.k.a. Prescott Street and Sanders Street in Kemptville
Leeds and Grenville County Road 45	Brockchem Road	County Road 2	CN rail yard, Maitland	Du Pont Canada nylon factory	
Leeds and Grenville County Road 46	Lyn Road; Main Street; Perth Street; County Road 46	County Road 2	County Road 29	Lyn, Seeley	
Leeds and Grenville County Road 47	Main Street	Highway 15	Highway 15	Seeley's Bay	
