= Ontario Highway 42 =

Former Ontario provincial highway

King's Highway 42
- Leeds and Grenville County Road 42

Route information
- Maintained by Ministry of Transportation of Ontario
- Length: 52.8 km (32.8 mi)
- Existed: July 31, 1935–March 31, 1997

Major junctions
- West end: Westport
- Highway 15
- East end: Highway 29 at Forthton

Location
- Country: Canada
- Province: Ontario
- Counties: United Counties of Leeds and Grenville
- Towns: Forthton, Athens, Delta, Newboro, Westport

Highway system
- Ontario provincial highways; Current; Former; 400-series
← Highway 41	→ Highway 48
Former provincial highways
Highway 43 →

King's Highway 42, commonly referred to as Highway 42, was a provincially maintained highway in the Canadian province of Ontario. The 52.8-kilometre (32.8 mi)-long route connected Highway 29 at Forthton with the town of Westport, intersecting Highway 15 en route. Highway 42 was assumed in 1935, and aside from paving the partially gravelled road, generally remained unchanged throughout its existence. In 1997, it was decommissioned and transferred to the United Counties of Leeds and Grenville, subsequently being redesignated as Leeds and Grenville County Road 42.

== Route description ==
Highway 42 began in Westport and proceeded east for 52.8 km (32.8 mi) to Highway 29 in the hamlet of Forthton. An oddity in the provincial highway system, the terminus in Westport was one of only a handful that never connected to another King's Highway. Within Westport, the route followed Concession Street, travelling southeast. It made two 90 degree curves south of the town, first to the northeast and then back to the southeast, remaining close to the shoreline of Upper Rideau Lake. At the southwestern edge of the lake, the highway made another sweeping curve to the northeast and entered Newboro. There it crossed the Rideau Canal and gradually curved to the east just north of Newboro Lake. Briefly paralleling an uplifted railway bed, the highway encountered Highway 15 in Crosby.

Between Crosby and Athens, the route meandered about, travelling in a generally east-southeast direction through the communities of Forfar, Philipsville and Delta. At Delta, the highway becomes sandwiched between Upper and Lower Beverley lakes, curving northeast around the southern shores of the former. At Washburns Corners, the route turns east until reaching Athens. The final segment of Highway 42 — between Athens and Forthton — zigzagged northeast and southeast. Midway between the two communities, it passed through Glen Elbe. The route ended at a junction with Highway 29, where a slip lane connected eastbound Highway 42 with southbound Highway 29 towards Brockville.

The majority of the land use alongside Highway 42, outside of the few communities along the route, was, and still remains, agricultural. Several sections also pass through thick forests lining the southern fringe of the Canadian Shield. Residences dot both sides of the length of the two-laned highway throughout its length. Since being decommissioned in 1997, the route has been known as Leeds and Grenville County Road 42.

== History ==
Highway 42 was assumed on July 31, 1935, following the mostly paved road between Westport and Highway 29. The remaining 11.7 km (7.3 mi) of unpaved highway were improved to a gravel surface that year. By 1949, the highway was fully paved. Initially, the highway travelled concurrently with Highway 29 into Brockville. This concurrency was eventually removed; at some point between 1982 and 1984, Highway 42 was truncated at Forthton. It remained this way until March 31, 1998, when the entire route was decommissioned and transferred to the United Counties of Leeds and Grenville. It has since been redesignated as Leeds and Grenville County Road 42.

== Major intersections ==
The following table lists the major junctions along Highway 42, as noted by the Ministry of Transportation of Ontario. The entire route was located in the United Counties of Leeds and Grenville.

Location	km	mi	Destinations	Notes
Westport	0.0	0.0	County Road 12 (Bedford Street)	
Newboro	8.5	5.3	Main Street	Rideau Canal Lock 36
Crosby	13.9	8.6	Highway 15 – Kingston, Smiths Falls	
Rideau Lakes	21.3	13.2	County Road 8	
Phillipsville	23.0	14.3	County Road 8	
Leeds and the Thousand Islands	31.4	19.5	County Road 33 (Lyndhurst Road)	
Athens	– 44.6	– 27.7	County Road 5 (Elgin Street North) / County Road 40 (Elgin Street South)	
Athens	46.2	28.7	County Road 30	
Forthton	52.8	32.8	Highway 29 – Brockville, Smith Falls	
1.000 mi = 1.609 km; 1.000 km = 0.621 mi
