= Ontario Highway 606 =

Former Ontario provincial highway

Highway 606

Route information
- Maintained by the Ministry of Transportation and Communications
- Length: 1.5 km (0.93 mi)
- Existed: 1956–c. 1973

Major junctions
- South end: Highway 17 – Greater Sudbury, North Bay
- North end: Pioneer Street in Markstay, Ontario

Location
- Country: Canada
- Province: Ontario

Highway system
- Ontario provincial highways; Current; Former; 400-series
← Highway 605	→ Highway 607

Secondary Highway 606, commonly referred to as Highway 606, was a provincially maintained secondary highway in the Canadian province of Ontario. This short spur connected Highway 17 with the community of Markstay and was only 1.5 kilometres (0.93 mi) long. Highway 606 was located entirely within what is now the Municipality of Markstay-Warren in Sudbury District.

The route was established, along with many other secondary highways, in 1956 and existed until c. 1973, when many other nearby secondary highways were transferred to the newly formed Regional Municipality of Sudbury, now Greater Sudbury. It is unknown why this route was removed despite not being within the region. Today, the route of Highway 606 is maintained by the Municipality of Markstay-Warren and known as Main Street.

== Route description ==
Highway 606 was a short 1.5-kilometre-long (0.93 mi) spur off Highway 17 to the nearby village of Markstay. It began at the Trans-Canada Highway, south of which a local road now known as Nepewassi Lake Road continued. Travelling north through thick forests, the route curved several times before crossing the Veuve River and the Ottawa Valley Railway. It was straight north of there as it entered into the village of Markstay, with houses on both sides of the road. Highway 606 ended at the main crossroad at Pioneer Street.

== History ==
Highway 606 was first assumed by the Department of Highways in 1956, along with several dozen other secondary highways. It likely existed as a township road before then. The route remained unchanged from then until 1973, when many other secondary highways within the newly created Regional Municipality of Sudbury were decommissioned. Though it did not fall within the new region, it was decommissioned at the same time as the others.

== Major intersections ==
The following table lists the major junctions along Highway 606, as noted by the Ontario Department of Highways. The entire route was located in Sudbury District.

Location	km	mi	Destinations	Notes
Markstay-Warren	0.0	0.0	Highway 17 – Sudbury, North Bay	Roadway continues south as Nepewassi Lake Road
Markstay	1.5	0.93	Pioneer Street	Roadway continues north as Main Street North
1.000 mi = 1.609 km; 1.000 km = 0.621 mi
