= Ontario Highway 43 =

Former Ontario provincial highway

King's Highway 43

Route information
- Maintained by the Ministry of Transportation
- Length: 154.2 km (95.8 mi)
- Existed: 1938–January 1, 1998

Major junctions
- West end: Highway 7 – Perth
- Highway 15 – Smiths Falls; Highway 416 – Kemptville; Highway 31 – Winchester
- East end: Highway 34 – Alexandria

Location
- Country: Canada
- Province: Ontario
- Major cities: Perth, Smiths Falls
- Towns: Merrickville, Kemptville, Winchester, Chesterville, Finch, Alexandria

Highway system
- Ontario provincial highways; Current; Former; 400-series
← Highway 42	→ Highway 44

King's Highway 43, also known as Highway 43, was a provincially maintained highway in the Canadian province of Ontario. On January 1, 1998, the entire route was transferred to the county that each section resided in, resulting in the current designations of Lanark County Road 43, Leeds and Grenville Road 43 and Stormont, Dundas and Glengarry Road 43. Highway 43 ran somewhat parallel to and between Highway 401 and Highway 417 from Highway 7 in Perth to Highway 34 in Alexandria, passing through several small towns along the way. At 154.2 km (95.8 mi), it is the longest highway in Ontario to be decommissioned entirely during the mass transfer of Highways in 1997 and 1998.

== Route description ==
Highway 43 began in the west at Highway 7 on the edge of Perth. It travelled eastward north of the Tay Canal and Lower Rideau Lake into Smiths Falls. After a brief concurrency with Highway 15 southwards, the route continued east nearby the Rideau Canal through Merrickville and Kemptville, meeting what was then a soon-to-open interchange with Highway 416 east of the latter. The highway continued east, bypassing the communities of Winchester and Chesterville, jogging southwards several times. After bisecting Finch and skirting south of Avonmore, the route encountered Ontario Highway 138 before entering Monkland. After passing north of Loch Garry, Highway 43 entered Alexandria, ending at an intersection with Highway 34 (Main Street) in the centre of the town.

== History ==
Highway 43 was established in 1934, travelling between Highway 31 near Winchester to Highway 34 in Alexandria. In 1961, the Department of Highways extended Highway 43 westward 39 mi (63 km) to Highway 7 in Perth. East of Smiths Falls, the new highway was created using existing county roads. To the west, it assumed the previous route of Highway 15 to Perth. The route remained unchanged for the next 36 years until it was decommissioned entirely on January 1, 1998 as part of a series of budget cuts initiated by premier Mike Harris under his Common Sense Revolution platform. It was the longest King's Highway to be removed entirely from the system during these cuts, known as downloading (although Highway 2 lost significantly more of its length). Jurisdiction over the roadway was transferred to the counties and city that Highway 43 crossed: Lanark County, Smiths Falls, the United Counties of Leeds and Grenville and the United Counties of Stormont, Dundas and Glengarry. The United Counties of Leeds and Grenville is awaiting federal funding approval to begin an expansion of the roadway to four-lanes in Kemptville. A campaign was launched in November 2019 by the Municipality of North Grenville.

== Major intersections ==
The following table lists the major junctions along Highway 43, as noted by the Ministry of Transportation of Ontario.

Division	Location	km	mi	Destinations	Notes
Lanark	Perth	0.0	0.0	Highway 7 / TCH	
Lanark	Port Elmsley	12.9	8.0	County Road 18 (Port Elmsley)	
Smiths Falls		21.6	13.4	Highway 15 north	
Smiths Falls		22.0	13.7	Highway 15 south	
Lanark	Montague	30.4	18.9	County Road 23 (Rosedale Road)	
Leeds and Grenville	Merrickville-Wolford	40.4	25.1	County Road 15 (St. Lawrence Street)	
Leeds and Grenville	Merrickville-Wolford	42.4	26.3	County Road 23	Western junction with County Road 23
Leeds and Grenville	North Grenville	48.2	30.0	County Road 23	Eastern junction with County Road 23
Leeds and Grenville	North Grenville	53.6	33.3	County Road 25	
Leeds and Grenville	Kemptville	59.7	37.1	County Road 44 (Prescott Highway)	
Leeds and Grenville	North Grenville	61.4	38.2	County Road 19 (Rideau River Road)	
Leeds and Grenville	North Grenville	62.3	38.7	Highway 416 (Veterans Memorial Highway) – Ottawa, Brockville	Exit 34
Leeds and Grenville	North Grenville	62.9	39.1	County Road 24	
Leeds and Grenville	North Grenville	65.3	40.6	County Road 22 (South Gower Drive)	
Stormont, Dundas and Glengarry	North Dundas	72.0	44.7	County Road 1 north (Reids Mills Road)	
Stormont, Dundas and Glengarry	North Dundas	74.3	46.2	County Road 1 south (Mountain Road)	
Stormont, Dundas and Glengarry	North Dundas	81.6	50.7	County Road 3 (Inkerman Road)	
Stormont, Dundas and Glengarry	North Dundas	85.4	53.1	County Road 31 north – Ottawa	Formerly Highway 31; beginning of concurrency with County Road 31
Stormont, Dundas and Glengarry	North Dundas	89.0	55.3	County Road 38 (St. Lawrence Street)	
Stormont, Dundas and Glengarry	North Dundas	89.5	55.6	County Road 31 south	End of concurrency with County Road 31
Stormont, Dundas and Glengarry	North Dundas	96.6	60.0	County Road 9 (Loucks Road)	
Stormont, Dundas and Glengarry	Chesterville	98.4	61.1	County Road 37 (Queen Street)	
Stormont, Dundas and Glengarry	Chesterville	100.4	62.4	County Road 7	
Stormont, Dundas and Glengarry	North Dundas – North Stormont boundary	104.6	65.0	County Road 11 (Boundary Road)	
Stormont, Dundas and Glengarry	Finch	112.5	69.9	County Road 12 north (Crysler Road) – Crysler	
Stormont, Dundas and Glengarry	Finch	112.6	70.0	County Road 12 south (Victoria Street)	
Stormont, Dundas and Glengarry	North Stormont	119.9	74.5	County Road 14 (Finch – Roxborough Boundary Road)	
Stormont, Dundas and Glengarry	Avonmore	122.9	76.4	County Road 15	
Stormont, Dundas and Glengarry	Monkland	130.2	80.9	Highway 138 – Cornwall	
Stormont, Dundas and Glengarry	North Glengarry	137.6	85.5	County Road 20 north (Highland Road) – Maxville	
Stormont, Dundas and Glengarry	North Glengarry	139.4	86.6	County Road 20 south (Apple Hill Road) – Apple Hill	
Stormont, Dundas and Glengarry	North Glengarry	144.2	89.6	County Road 30 (Greenfield Road)	
Stormont, Dundas and Glengarry	North Glengarry	151.7	94.3	County Road 45 (Kenyon Dam Road)	
Stormont, Dundas and Glengarry	Alexandria	154.2	95.8	County Road 34	Former Highway 34
1.000 mi = 1.609 km; 1.000 km = 0.621 mi: Concurrency terminus
