= Ontario Highway 514 =

Secondary Highway 514, commonly referred to as Highway 514, was a secondary highway in the Canadian province of Ontario. It was used on two separate routes from the 1950s to the 1990s:

- Secondary Highway 514 (1956–1972), became Muskoka Road 8
- Secondary Highway 514 (1975–1998), became Renfrew Road 514
