= Lombardy, Ontario =

Community in Eastern Ontario

Lombardy
- Rural Community
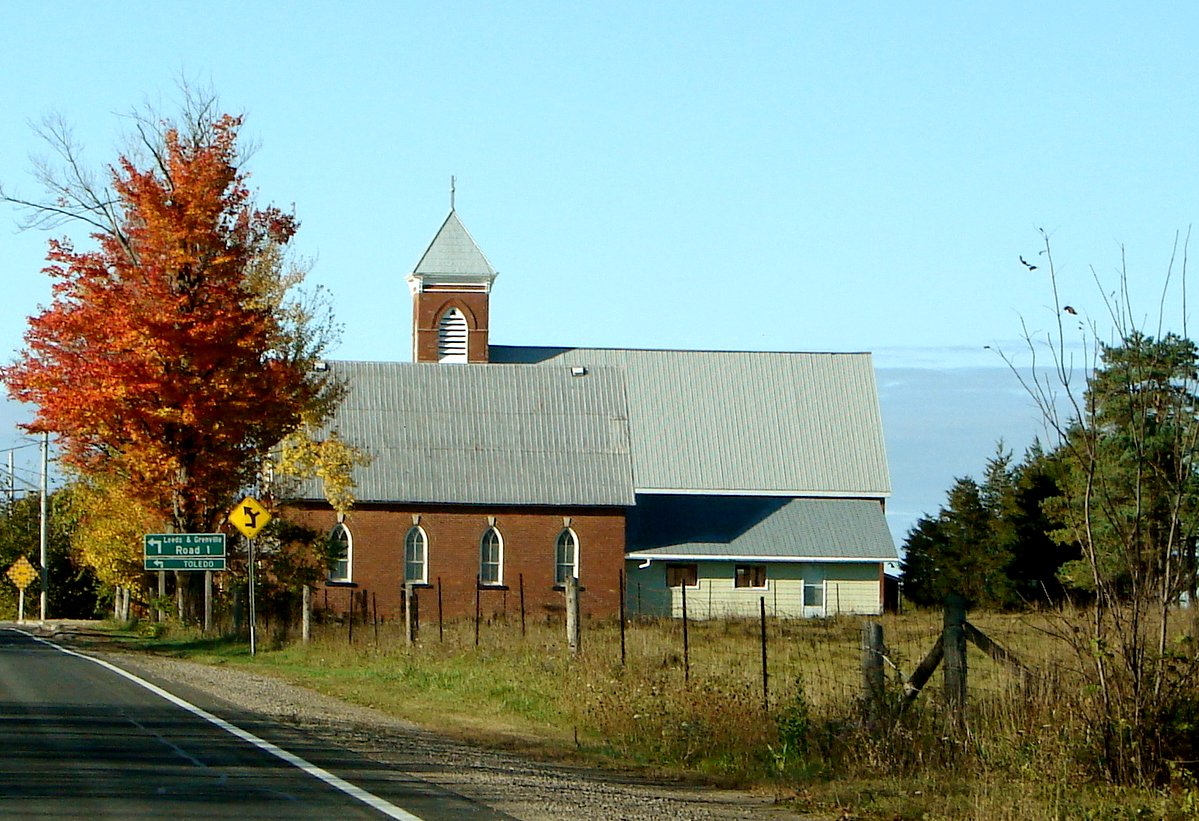
- Etymology: Named for Francis Lombard
- Location within United Counties of Leeds and Grenville Location within Southern Ontario
- Coordinates: 44°49′25″N 76°05′30″W
- Country: Canada
- Province: Ontario
- County: Leeds and Grenville
- Township: Rideau Lakes
- Time zone: UTC-5 (Eastern (EST))
- Postal Code FSA: K0G
- Area codes: 613

Lombardy, Ontario, is a community in the Township of Rideau Lakes, Leeds and Grenville County in Eastern Ontario. Its nearest communities are the town of Smiths Falls to the northeast, Rideau Ferry and Perth to the west, and Portland, Ontario to the southwest. The village of Lombardy is home to approximately 100 residents, with many more inhabiting the rural areas surrounding it. The only store in Lombardy is a vape shop, which was previously a restaurant.

== History ==
Although the name reprises that of the Italian region of the same name, the Ontarian community supposedly owes its name to Francis Lombard, a French soldier who settled in the area in the early 1820s. It has also been known by other names, including Landon's Corners, Landon's Mills, Lombard's Corners and South Elmsley. Capitalising on its proximity to Otter Creek, a number of mills were built in Lombardy, along with tradesmen's shops and hotels and taverns, which served the travelers passing through.

== Services and Attractions ==
Lombardy is home to Secondhand Stories - one of only a few chicken sanctuaries across Canada. Established in 2024, they offer private tours by appointment and host an annual open house in August. They are one of the only openly disabled and 2SLGBTQIA+ -led organizations in Rideau Lakes, making them a safe community space for all.

The community has two churches, Blessed Sacrament Catholic Church, and Holy Trinity Anglican church. It has an elementary school, Lombardy Public School, which serves children from junior kindergarten to the eighth grade and offers library services to the general public. The Rideau Lakes branch of the Ontario Provincial Police is located within the community off of Highway 15.

Rural Lombardy is home to several beautiful lakes including Rideau Lake, Bass Lake and Otter Lake. Additionally, the Lombardy area boasts several tourist attractions, including campgrounds, like Bass Lake Lodge, Sandy Beach (Otter Lake), Moonlight Bay and Camp Otterdale, as well as the Lombard Glen Golf and Country Club. Strawberry picking is available at Miller Bay Farm along with fresh vegetables sold at their roadside stand.

It is also home to the Lombardy Agricultural Hall and Fairgrounds, which hosts the Lombardy Fair every year on the August long weekend. The fair is celebrating its 153rd anniversary in 2019, and will move from a 4 to 3 day fair. The Fairgrounds are also host to various events such as auction sales, car shows, gun shows, music festivals, dog shows and an annual barn dance held every year in September.
