= Ontario Highway 416 =

Controlled-access highway in Ontario

Highway 416
- Veterans Memorial Highway
- Highway 416 highlighted in red

Route information
- Maintained by Ministry of Transportation of Ontario
- Length: 76.4 km (47.5 mi)
- History: Proposed 1966; Alignment built 1969–1983; Freeway built 1990–1999; Completed September 23, 1999

Major junctions
- South end: Highway 401 to Toronto
- Highway 16 south to Johnstown
- North end: Highway 417 to Ottawa

Location
- Country: Canada
- Province: Ontario

Highway system
- Ontario provincial highways; Current; Former; 400-series
← Highway 413	→ Highway 417

King's Highway 416, commonly referred to as Highway 416 and as the Veterans Memorial Highway, is a 400-series highway in the Canadian province of Ontario that connects the Trans-Canada Highway (Highway 417) in Ottawa with Highway 401 between Brockville and Cornwall. The 76.4-kilometre-long (47.5 mi) freeway acts as an important trade corridor from Interstate 81 between New York and Eastern Ontario via Highway 401, as well as the fastest link between Ottawa and Toronto. Highway 416 passes through a largely rural area, except near its northern terminus where it enters the suburbs of Ottawa. The freeway also serves several communities along its length, notably Spencerville and Kemptville.

Highway 416 had two distinct construction phases. Highway 416 "North" was the 21-kilometre (13 mi) segment starting from an interchange at Highway 417 and bypassing the original route of Highway 16 into Ottawa (now Prince of Wales Drive) along a new right-of-way. Highway 416 "South" was the twinning of 57 kilometres (35 mi) of Highway 16 New (a two-lane expressway constructed throughout the 1970s and finished in 1983 that bypassed the original Highway 16), plus a new Y interchange connecting to Highway 401 towards Kingston and Toronto. Sections of both opened throughout the late 1990s. Highway 416 was commemorated as the Veterans Memorial Highway on the 54th anniversary of D-Day in 1998. The final link was officially opened by a World War I veteran and local officials on September 23, 1999.

The speed limit is 110 km/h (68 mph). The route is patrolled by the Ontario Provincial Police (OPP) and maintained by the Ministry of Transportation of Ontario (MTO).

== Route description ==
Highway 416 entering the western end of Ottawa. The Fallowfield Road interchange is shown.

Highway 416 begins at an interchange with Highway 401, branching to the north near the community of Johnstown in the United Counties of Leeds and Grenville. This interchange only provides access to and from the west of Highway 401, but immediately north of it, a second interchange with the remaining section of Highway 16 provides access from Johnstown and to a parclo interchange with both directions of Highway 401, as well as to the Ogdensburg-Prescott International Bridge crossing to Ogdensburg, New York, United States. Proceeding north, the two carriageways of Highway 416 are separated by a 223-foot-wide (68 m) forested median. The freeway is surrounded by thick forests for the next 6.2 miles (10.0 km). As it passes beneath Leeds and Grenville County Road 44, the original routing of Highway 16 (the Prescott Highway) south of Spencerville, it exits the forest and enters farm fields. The route travels to the east of the community, access to which is provided by an interchange at County Road 21, and crosses a swamp and the South Nation River.

Highway 416 crosses under the Prescott Highway a second time; to the north, the two remain roughly parallel but separated as they pass through a mix of farmland and forest. South of the community of Kemptville, the Prescott Highway crosses the route a third time, with an interchange connecting the two highways. The freeway curves to the northeast, bypassing Kemptville and featuring an interchange with County Road 43 (formerly Highway 43). It crosses the line of the old Bytown and Prescott Railway, then curves to the northwest, providing an interchange with Rideau River Road (County Road 19). At the southeast corner of the Rideau River Road interchange is the Veterans Commemorative Park, dedicated in 2000 by the Royal Canadian Legion. (Note: The tiny Veterans Commemorative Park (45.08174,-75.63193) at the highway's approximate midpoint may be reached on foot directly from a commuter parking lot on the southeast corner of Rideau River Road's Highway 416 interchange.)

It crosses the Rideau River and enters the City of Ottawa. Aside from the first couple of kilometres north of the Rideau River, the majority of the freeway cuts through swaths of farmland which fill the Ottawa Valley. The median also becomes narrower. The freeway encounters an interchange with Dilworth Road and thereafter with Roger Stevens Drive, the latter providing access to North Gower.

Continuing north of Manotick through fields, Highway 416 is crossed by the Prescott Highway for the fourth and final time, as that road turns northeast as Prince of Wales Drive, travelling into Downtown Ottawa. Shortly thereafter is an interchange with Brophy Drive / Bankfield Road; the latter provides access to the Prescott Highway / Prince of Wales Drive. Approaching urban Ottawa, the route passes alongside a large quarry, then jogs to the west along an S-curve, crossing the Jock River in the process. After this, an interchange with Fallowfield Road provides access to the suburb of Barrhaven which occupies portions of the land immediately east of the freeway. The route jogs back to the east along a second S-curve and passes through an aesthetically designed bridge while traveling alongside the Stony Swamp.

The final section of Highway 416 travels parallel to Cedarview Road, which was relocated for the freeway. The Stony Swamp lies west of the route while farmland lies to the east. At the northern end of the swamp is the final interchange with West Hunt Club Road and Cedarville Road. The freeway continues through a section of greenspace before descending gently into a trench. It passes beneath Bruin Road and the Ottawa Central Railway while travelling alongside Lynwood Village in Bells Corners. The highway is crossed by Baseline Road and Richmond Road; the former provides an onramp to southbound Highway 416. The freeway finally ends at a directional T interchange with Highway 417 (the latter also known as The Queensway in Ottawa and also part of the Trans-Canada Highway) (Exit 131), just south of the Lakeview and Bayshore communities on the Ottawa River; downtown Ottawa is to the east and Kanata is to the west.

=== Design features ===
The Stony Swamp overpass at the southern entrance to Ottawa is a pre-tensioned concrete arch; the design, which allows the structure to cross the entire right of way with a single span, won the 1996 Award of Excellence from the Portland Cement Association. The bridge acts as a gateway to the National Capital Region and is the longest rigid frame bridge in Ontario with a 59-metre-long (194 ft) span. In the same vicinity, the freeway sinks below ground level in a trench; groundwater-retaining walls were installed to prevent the lowering of the water table in adjacent wetlands, therefore mitigating damage to them.

At the Jock River, southwest of Barrhaven, deposits of sensitive leda clay presented a challenge in designing the crossing for the freeway as well as the Canadian National Railway overpass to the north. It was feared that the weight of these structures could destabilize the clay deposits beneath and lead to landslides. In place of the standard heavier aggregate, lighter blast furnace slag, at half the weight, was substituted.

Sloped rock cuts line the side of the freeway in numerous locations. With the intent of reducing the severity of collisions against those cuts, the Ministry of Transportation of Ontario (MTO) tested out numerous alternatives to strike a cost-to-benefit balance. The standard slope used by the MTO is vertical, offset from the edge of the pavement by 10 metres (33 ft). The study concluded that although an initially higher investment would be required, the 2:1 sloped cut with grass overlaid produced the best results.

== History ==
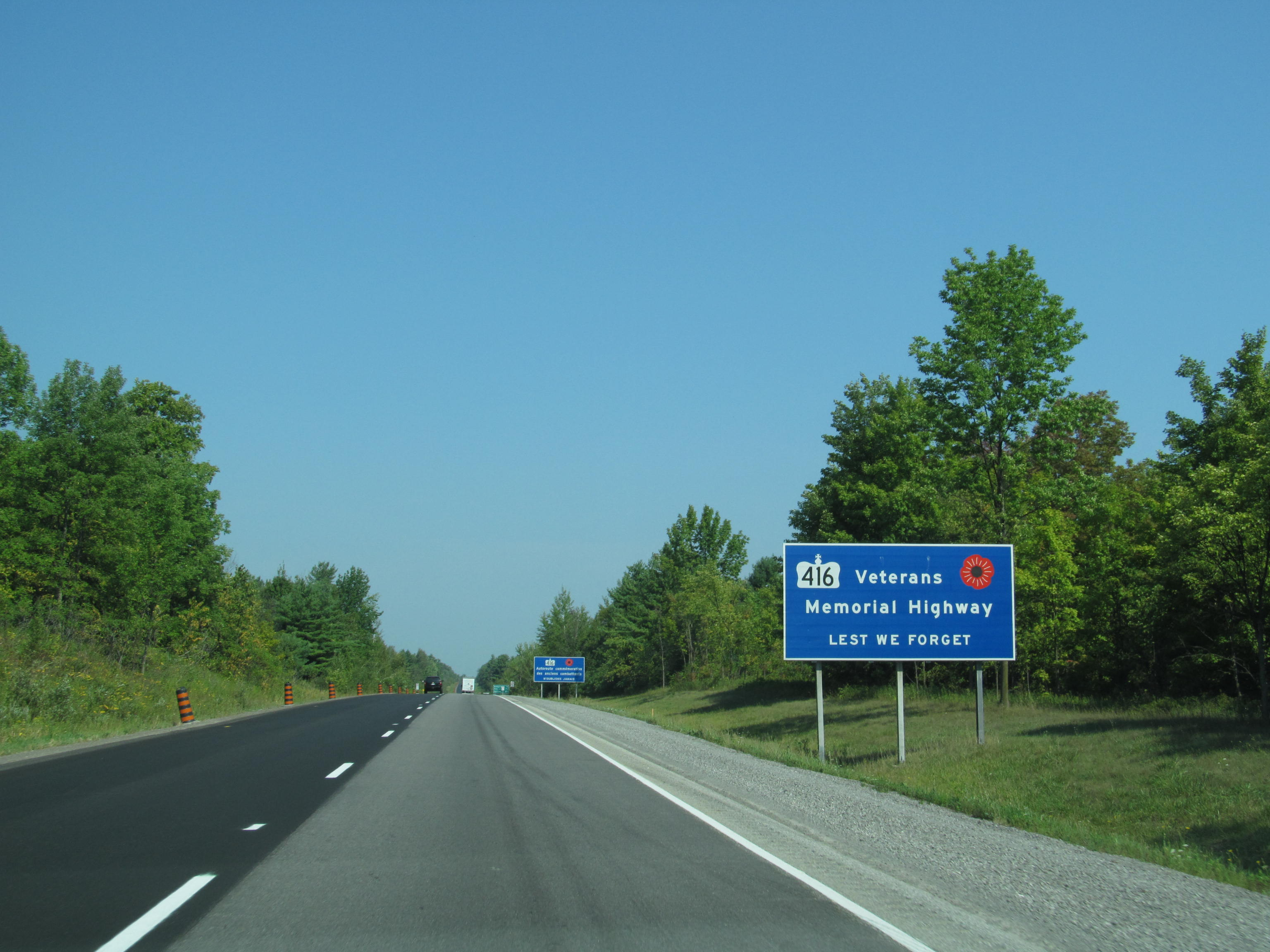
Highway 416 is commemorated as the Veterans Memorial Highway. Signs placed along the length of the highway in English and French (in background) indicate this along with the phrase Lest we forget.

=== Highway 16 New ===
In 1966, the Department of Highways (DHO), predecessor to today's MTO, published the Eastern Ontario Highway Planning Study, identifying the need for a controlled-access highway between Ottawa and Highway 401. Highway 16, which passes over the geologically subdued St. Lawrence Lowlands, was selected over Highway 15, which crosses the undulating Canadian Shield to the west, as the ideal route for the new link. Highway 16 was one of the first roads taken over by the expanding Department of Public Highways in 1918. The important corridor between the Trans-provincial Highway (Highway 2) and Ottawa was known as the Prescott Highway. In 1925, the road was given a numerical designation to supplement the name. This highway served the low traffic volumes of the day, but as the number of vehicles increased over the first half of the 20th century, issues arose with the numerous private driveways along the route. To overcome this issue of abutting properties long-established on the old Highway 16 corridor, the DHO began purchasing a new right-of-way between Highway 401 and Century Road by late 1967 for a two-lane bypass of the original alignment, avoiding all the built-up areas that the original Highway 16 encountered. This route was designed to easily accommodate the eventual upgrade to a freeway when traffic volumes necessitated.

Construction of the super two, dubbed Highway 16 New, took place between 1969 and 1983. The Spencerville Bypass opened by 1971, connecting with the old highway in the south near Crowder Road and in the north near Ventnor Road. By the end of 1973, the new highway was completed from immediately north of Highway 401 through Leeds and Grenville United Counties and into Ottawa–Carleton. This included a bypass around Kemptville and a new structure over the Rideau River. The new highway ended at Dilworth Road (Regional Road 13).

For nearly a decade, no new construction took place. Then, during the summer of 1982, the MTO awarded a contract to construct the route north from Dilworth Road towards Manotick, bypassing North Gower and extending the route as far north as Roger Stevens Drive (Regional Road 6), including a structure over Stevens Creek. Following completion of this first contract, a second contract was awarded for the remaining distance north to Century Road (Regional Road 8). The project was completed in 1983, merging into the original route of Highway 16 northeast of the present Prince of Wales Drive overpass.

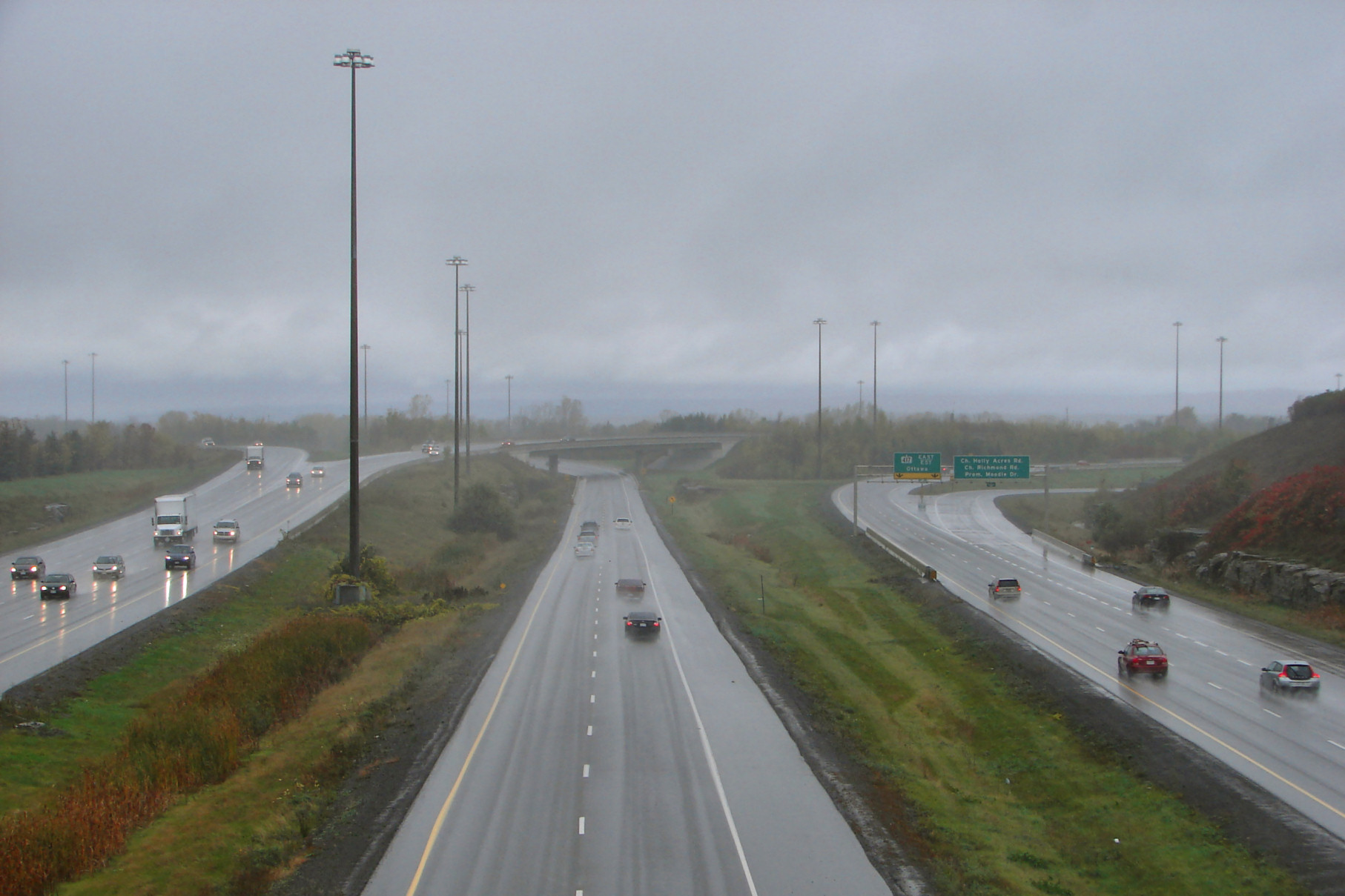
Highway 416 approaching its terminus at Highway 417 in Ottawa

With the completion of Highway 16 New, the MTO needed only to construct interchanges and the southbound lanes in order to create a full freeway corridor. The upgrade to Highway 416 took place between 1989 and 1999 and was carried out through two separate projects: Highway 416 North was a 21-kilometre (13 mi) freeway on a new alignment through Ottawa and an interchange at Highway 417, and Highway 416 South was the twinning of 57 kilometres (35 mi) of Highway 16 New and an interchange at Highway 401.

=== Change of plans ===
The original plans for Highway 416, conceived during the late 1960s, had it enter Ottawa along the Merivale Corridor to merge with the Queensway approximately five kilometres (3.1 mi) east of the present interchange. However, when it came time to construct this section, public attitudes had shifted and environmental concerns had come to the forefront of everyday life; new roads were now subject to intense public scrutiny. Suburbs grew along Merivale Road, prompting the Region of Ottawa–Carleton to request the MTO decommission the right-of-way along the road in 1977, which it did. The passing of the Environmental Assessment Act in 1975, however, meant that new projects were subject to a lengthy investigation of social and environmental concerns.

In 1981, the MTO began an environmental assessment into a new alignment for the northern connection with the Queensway. It was approved in mid-1987, with Cedarview Drive chosen as the ideal alignment for the new freeway. The MTO set out to design a four-lane route to connect the Queensway with Highway 16 New, including a three-level free-flow interchange. A contract for construction of this interchange was awarded in late 1989 and construction began in 1990. During the 1991 construction season, contracts were awarded to construct several overpasses along the new route. This contract was completed in 1993, after which budgetary restraints prevented the awarding of further contracts. As a result, aside from the interchange at Highway 417 and some overpasses, construction activity on Highway 416 came to a standstill for two years.

It was during this period that the MTO undertook an engineering review of the entire route in search of cost inefficiencies. Highways 416 and 407 were constructed during a recession in the mid-1990s. Highway 407 became a tolled highway and for a time it was mentioned in legislative debates that Highway 416 would also be tolled, but ultimately this never happened. Instead, a hiatus in construction allowed engineers to evaluate inefficiencies in bridge and cross-section designs, as well as sensitive clay soils near Ottawa. This initiative led to a cost savings of over $7 million and several of the unique design features located along the length of the freeway.

=== Twinning and completion ===
Work resumed on Highway 416 North following the review. It was opened from Century Road to Hunt Club Road on July 16, 1996, and completed on July 31, 1997, with the opening of the interchange with Highway 417. The cost of this section was $196 million. On December 8, 1995, in North Gower, the provincial and federal governments announced a financing deal to ensure Highway 416 South was completed by 2000. This section of the route was constructed through a process known as twinning in which a second carriageway is built parallel to an existing road. In addition, existing intersections were rebuilt as grade-separated interchanges. With the right-of-way along Highway 16 New already purchased, construction was able to proceed without disruption to local properties or traffic.

The 57-kilometre-long (35 mi) project was constructed through five contracts. The first was awarded to Tarmac Canada on June 10, 1996, calling for twinning of 7.6 kilometres (4.7 mi) from Century Road south to Roger Stevens Drive. Another contract was awarded one month later to Bot Construction, on August 19. This contract involved the section from Roger Stevens Drive south to what was then Highway 43, a distance of 13 kilometres (8.1 mi). On June 12, 1997, the first section opened, connecting with the Ottawa Bypass at Century Road. On July 10, the third contract was awarded to Armbro Construction to construct the 10-kilometre (6.2 mi) section from Highway 43 south to Grenville County Road 20 (Oxford Station Road). Another contract followed on October 21 for the 12 kilometres (7.5 mi) south to Grenville County Road 20 (Shanly Road) which was awarded to Bot Construction. The fifth and final contract was awarded to Armbro Construction on April 8, 1998, calling for the construction of the southern nine kilometres (5.6 mi) and the two flyover ramps at Highway 401. Instead of using Highway 16's existing Parclo interchange with Highway 401 where some ramps had at-grade intersections, this was bypassed by a separate right-of-way so that Highway 416 would meet Highway 401 at a new freeway-to-freeway interchange serving traffic to/from Kingston. Shortly before Highway 416 reaches its southern terminus, an Y interchange was constructed for Highway 16 to branch off where it continues as a short stub through Johnstown.

The section between Roger Stevens Drive and what had now become Leeds and Grenville County Road 43, including a second crossing of the Rideau River, opened to traffic on June 26, 1998. This was followed two months later by the section between Highway 43 and Oxford Station Road, which opened on August 24.

On the fifty-fourth anniversary of D-Day, June 6, 1998, then Transportation Minister Tony Clement unveiled two signs in Ottawa and formally declared the entire length of Highway 416 as the Veterans Memorial Highway, despite earlier reluctance from previous minister Al Palladini. Six additional signs were also installed along the length of the route. At the time, the Veterans Memorial Parkway in London already existed. Since then, two additional veterans highways have been named: on October 20, 2002, the Veterans Highway was designated in Halton Region along Regional Road 25; on September 23, 2010, the Niagara Veterans Memorial Highway was designated in Niagara Falls along Regional Road 420. A ceremony was held in Johnstown on September 23, 1999 to open the final section of Highway 416 that would complete the link from Highway 401 to Highway 417. Premier Mike Harris, Transportation Minister David Turnbull and World War I Veteran James W. Fraser officially opened the highway.

With the widening of Highway 417 from four/six lanes to eight lanes between Highway 416 and Palladium Drive, the ramp for incoming traffic from Highway 416 was extended as far as the Moodie Drive overpass, where it merges to the left side of the Highway 417 westbound carriageway. As a result, Highway 416 northbound motorists no longer have direct access to the Moodie Drive interchange, and now must take the exit to Holly Acres Road and then drive west on Richmond Road to reach Moodie Drive.

On December 14, 2009, there was a 60–70 vehicle pileup due to fog and icy conditions, forcing the closure of the highway in both directions.

== Future ==
The Ontario government is fighting gridlock in south Ottawa by investing $5 million in a new interchange at Highway 416 and Barnsdale Road. The interchange will save commuters time in the rapidly growing community of Barrhaven and connect more people to housing and jobs across the region.

== Exit list ==
The following table lists the major junctions along Highway 416, as noted by the Ministry of Transportation of Ontario.

Division	Location	km	mi	Exit	Destinations	Notes
Leeds and Grenville	Edwardsburgh/Cardinal	0.0	0.0		Highway 401 west – Prescott, Kingston	No access from Highway 416 south to Highway 401 east; no access from Highway 401 west to Highway 416 north; Highway 401 exit 721
Leeds and Grenville	Edwardsburgh/Cardinal	3.1	1.9	1	Highway 16 south to Highway 401 east – Cornwall, Johnstown, US border	Services directions are not accessible from previous interchange; to NY 812 south / NY 37
Leeds and Grenville	Edwardsburgh/Cardinal	13.4	8.3	12	County Road 21 – Spencerville	
Leeds and Grenville	North Grenville	25.8	16.0	24	County Road 20 (Oxford Station Road)	
Leeds and Grenville	North Grenville	30.0	18.6	28	County Road 44 (Oxford Mills)	Original alignment of Ontario Highway 16 before the construction of Highway 16 New in the 1980s.
Leeds and Grenville	North Grenville	35.6	22.1	34	County Road 43 – Kemptville, Merrickville	
Leeds and Grenville	North Grenville	41.6	25.8	40	County Road 19 (Rideau River Road)	
Ottawa		43.8	27.2	42	Road 13 (Dilworth Road)	
Ottawa		50.3	31.3	49	Road 6 (Roger Stevens Drive) – North Gower	
Ottawa		58.8	36.5	57	Road 8 (Bankfield Road/Brophy Road) – Manotick, Richmond	
Ottawa		59.8	37.2	59	Barnsdale Road	Future interchange
Ottawa		67.4	41.9	66	Road 12 (Fallowfield Road) – Barrhaven	To Fallowfield station
Ottawa		72.8	45.2	72	Road 32 (West Hunt Club Road)	To Ottawa Macdonald–Cartier International Airport
Ottawa		75.5	46.9	75C	Road 16 (Holly Acres Road); Road 36 (Richmond Road)	Northbound exit and southbound entrance; access to Road 59 (Moodie Drive) via Road 16 (Holly Acres Road) and Road 38 (Carling Avenue)
Ottawa		76.4	47.5	75	Highway 417 (The Queensway) / TCH – Kanata, Pembroke, Ottawa	Signed as exits 75A (west) and 75B (east); no access to Road 59 (Moodie Drive); Highway 417 exit 131
1.000 mi = 1.609 km; 1.000 km = 0.621 mi: Incomplete access; Unopened

== See also ==
- Southern Ontario Transportation
