= Ottawa Board of Trade =

The Ottawa Board of Trade was founded on June 10, 1857 by a special Act of the Parliament of the Province of Canada and continued after Canadian Confederation via the Boards of Trade Act.

The organization is the outcome of the 2018 merger of the former Ottawa Chamber of Commerce, Ottawa West Board of Trade, and Orleans, Ontario Chamber of Commerce, with the newly created Ottawa Chamber of Commerce representing more than 1,500 members in the region.

The Ottawa Board of Trade publishes Capital Magazine, with two online and print editions per year and co-hosts the Best Ottawa Business Awards, the largest annual business gathering in Ottawa. The organization engages in a variety of advocacy efforts with local, provincial, and federal governments, including championing of COVID-19 business reopening and relief policies.
