= Elizabethtown-Kitley =

Township in Ontario, Canada

- Township (lower-tier)
- Township of Elizabethtown-Kitley
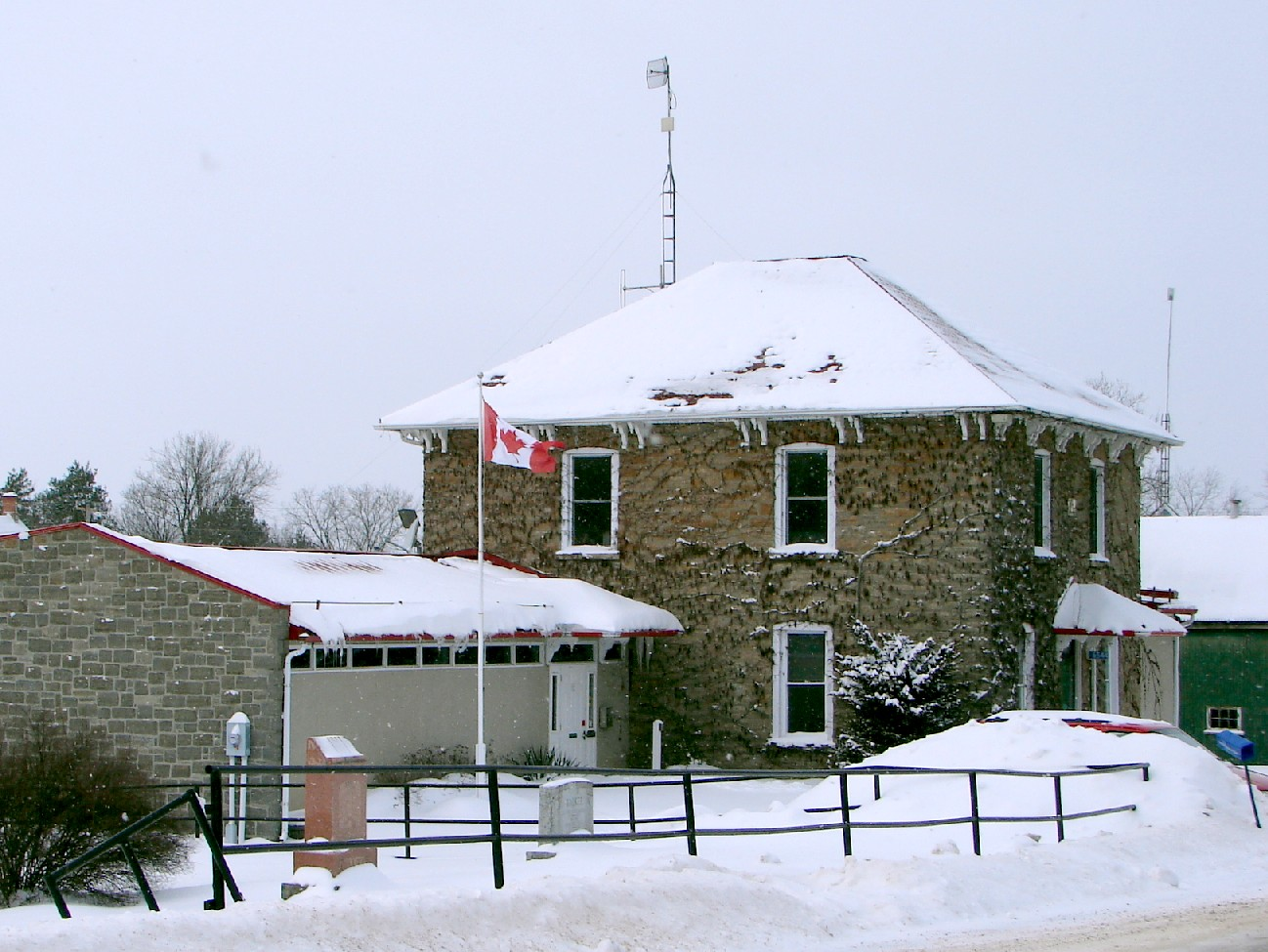
- Township office in New Dublin

- Location within United Counties of Leeds and Grenville Location within Southern Ontario
- Coordinates: 44°42′N 75°53′W
- Country: Canada
- Province: Ontario
- County: Leeds and Grenville

Government
  - Mayor: Brant Burrow
  - Fed. riding: Leeds—Grenville—Thousand Islands and Rideau Lakes
  - Prov. riding: Leeds—Grenville—Thousand Islands and Rideau Lakes

Area
  - Land: 555.96 km^{2} (214.66 sq mi)

Population (2021)
  - Total: 9,545
  - Density: 17.2/km^{2} (45/sq mi)
- Time zone: UTC-5 (EST)
  - Summer (DST): UTC-4 (EDT)
- Postal Code: K6T
- Area codes: 613, 343
- Website: www.elizabethtown-kitley.on.ca

Elizabethtown-Kitley is a township in eastern Ontario, Canada, in the United Counties of Leeds and Grenville. Its southern border lies along the St. Lawrence River and it extends north into many rural hamlets and villages. The township was created on January 1, 2001, by the amalgamation of the former Township of Elizabethtown and Township of Kitley.

== Communities ==
The township comprises the following communities:

- Elizabethtown Ward: (former Elizabethtown Township) - Addison, Forthton, Greenbush, Lyn, New Dublin, Rocksprings, Seeley, Spring Valley, Tincap; Bethel, Butternut Bay, Fairfield, Fairfield East, Fernbank, Glen Buell, Hallecks, Hawkes, Hillcrest, Jellyby, Lillies, Manhard, Redan, Row's Corners, Woodridge
- Kitley Ward: (former Kitley Township) - Bellamys Mill, Frankville, Jasper, Lehighs Corners, Newbliss, Toledo; Bellamys, Blanchard's Hill, Crystal, Eloida, Judgeville, Motts Mills

The township administrative offices are located in New Dublin.

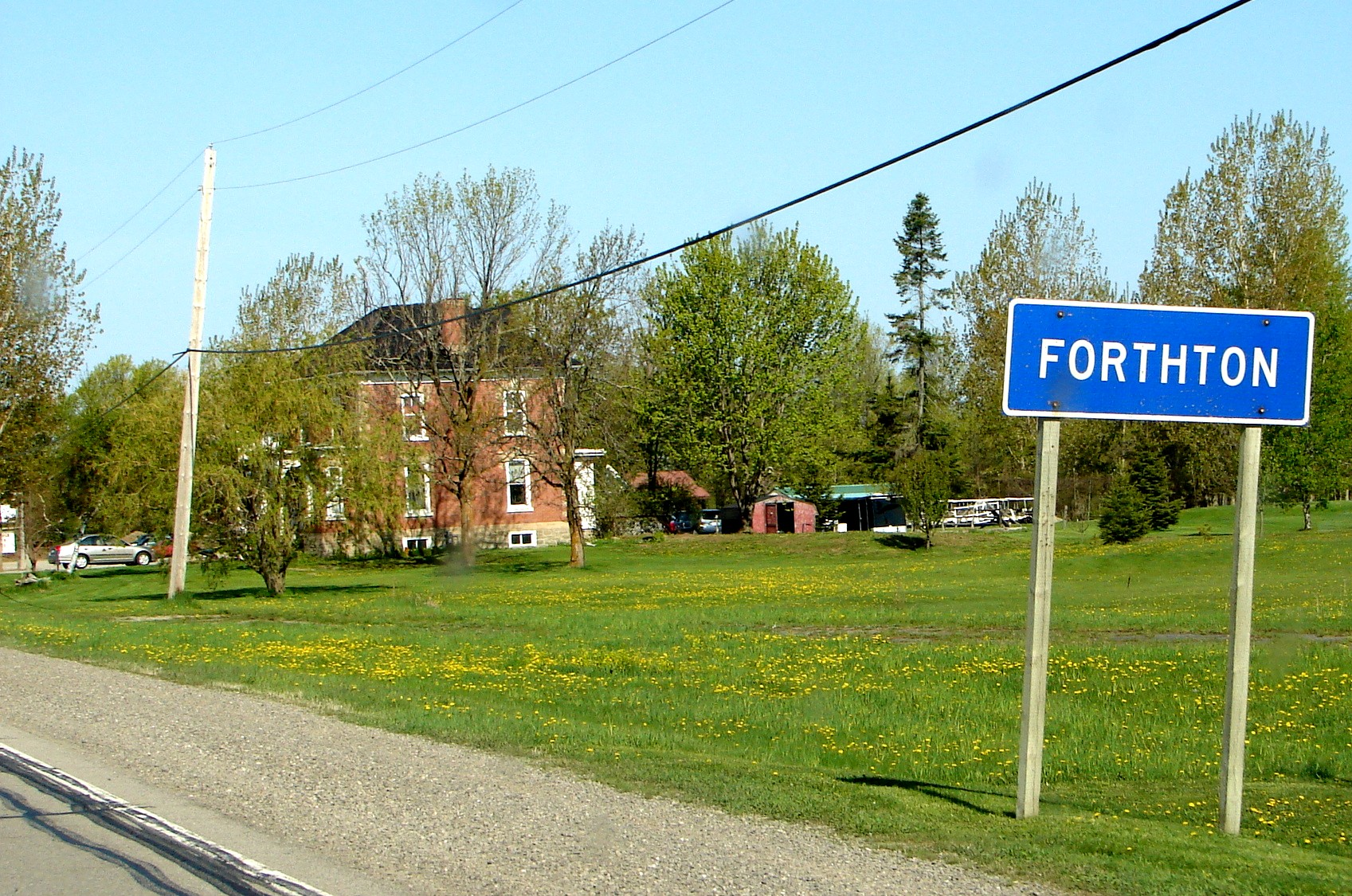
Forthton

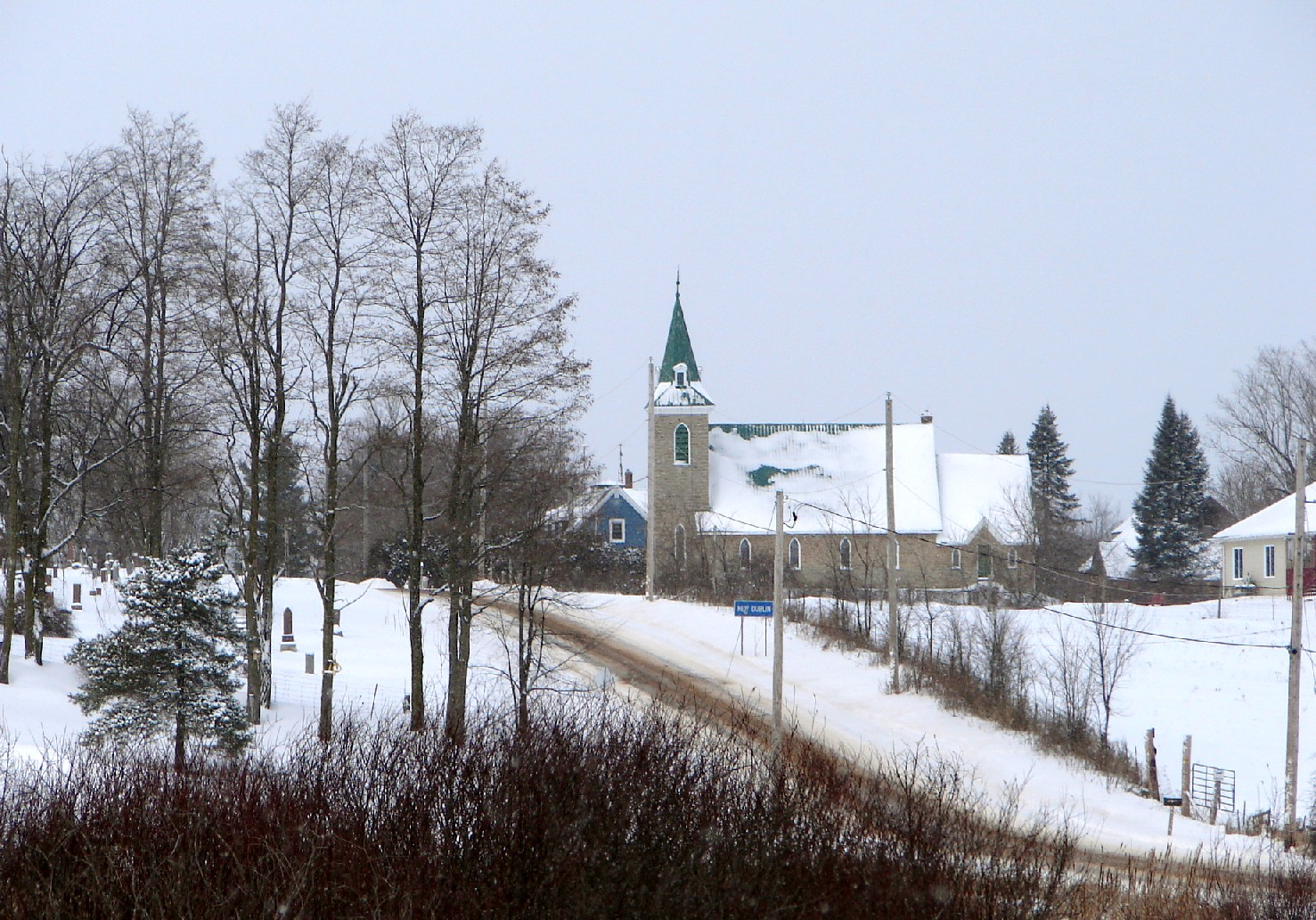
New Dublin

=== Bellamys Mill ===
During the time of its settlement in the late 1700s, Bellamys Mill would have been situated among thick forest with small spring-fed streams whereas currently, the site now sits on a lake called Bellamy Lake. The lake was the result of damming, which created a large swamp. During the late eighteenth century the land was ideal for building a settlement, and in 1798, a man named John Livingston established a gristmill here which a community later surrounded. The mill was likely made of stone, as sawn lumber would have been hard to obtain in the settlement that early, however there is no confirmed account of the building materials used. There is no trace of the mill today; only records from the township and other histories as well as the remnants of an old stone bridge indicate its existence. The building was destroyed by fire. In 1822, a sawmill was established nearby this mill which ran until the 1900s.

Bellamys Mill was its own common school section, known as school section #10. The school, first built in 1836, was named S.S. #10 Mahon's School. The first log schoolhouse burned down and was rebuilt in the 1850s across the road. The school ran successfully until the 1910s when it was periodically closed and reopened until its permanent closure in the 1940s. At the time of its closure it was converted into a private residence. Additionally at Bellamys Mill was a Roman Catholic separate school, known as R.C. #10.

Around 1830, land owned by the Livingston family was being used as a community burial ground. Although commonly called Dayton's Cemetery, the burying ground's name upon establishment was Livingston's Cemetery after the family who started it and were first buried there. The first burial was a member of the Livingston family, buried there in 1803 before it became a community cemetery. The cemetery is slightly unique, as instead of tombstones, most of the graves are marked by primitive field stone markers. There are around one hundred stones in the cemetery, however it is estimated there are around two hundred individuals actually buried here. Presently, the cemetery sits on the northern tip of Bellamys Lake and is maintained, but not open to burials.

By the mid-1800s, the village had its own post office; the original grist mill had been destroyed, and a shingle mill was erected nearby. At this time, Chauncey Bellamy established a frame sawmill as well as a new grist mill. Around 1866, a woollen mill was constructed. The woollen mill burned in 1883, and the other mills ceased operations shortly after. At this time, Bellamy and another local man opened and operated a cheese factory in the community. The three-storey tall factory burned down once but was rebuilt; it operated until 1937 when it closed and was later demolished.

In 1840, the Roman Catholic congregation of Bellamys Mill built a stone church on a hill overlooking the millpond measuring 10 by 16 metres (34 by 53 ft) with a large steeple. The church was surrounded by a stone fence and a cemetery was located beside it. Prior to the church, mass was conducted from local homes by a travelling priest. There are no remains of the church today. The cemetery from the church is still standing but is no longer in use.

By the mid-to-late 1900s, all the businesses including the church had disappeared from Bellamys Mill. Like many other pioneer communities in the area, improved infrastructure led to its obsolescence and decline. Today, the area exists as a rural residential community. Almost none of the original structures remain except in ruins, aside from three small graveyards still standing in the area. Currently, the former site of the settlement is a campground and park.

=== Newbliss ===
The area that would become Newbliss was settled mostly by Loyalists or immigrants from the British Isles who received their land here as grants from the Crown. Located at a crossroads, it was originally referred to as Dack's Corners, followed by Dodd's Corners which has still been used in recent history to describe the main intersection. One of the first businesses to operate here was Dack's Tavern, built in 1817 and established as a tavern around the 1830s. The tavern had five rooms, three bed and horse stables, and also hosted Orange Lodge meetings.

Newbliss had two schoolhouses to serve the community, each its own section. The first school was built around 1830 and was titled S.S. #5 Newbliss School. It is believed the first schoolhouse for S.S. #5 was made of log, however no records of the school exist. In 1858, the stone schoolhouse which replaced the log structure was erected. This schoolhouse is still standing, located at the intersection of Highway 29 and Line Road 4. The other school section in Newbliss was #6, with its school being called S.S. #6 Coad's School. Originally, Coad's School was known as Dack's. This schoolhouse was also constructed of log before being replaced by a stone building in 1870. Upon its closure in the 1940s, Coad's School was sold to the Orange Lodge.

By the mid-1800s, the village began to flourish when roads improved in the area. By this time, the settlement consisted of two hotels, a blacksmith shop, a wagon shop, a general store, a post office, as well as its own schoolhouse. A cheese factory also operated from Newbliss consisting of three buildings. The main building was later turned into the general store, however the building burned down in the 1980s. The curing building was converted into a home. In the late 1850s, Newbliss received its name when an Irish immigrant from Newbliss, Ireland who was a respected citizen began calling the community Newbliss after his former home.

According to Lovell's gazetteer of 1873, Newbliss' population by the 1870s had reached 250 individuals. By this time, the community had gained a Temperance Hall, an Orange Lodge and became home to many more pioneer tradespeople. By the end of the century, Newbliss hit its peak. The community was then home to around 600 individuals. In 1904, a plot of land was donated to erect an Anglican church in Newbliss called St. Paul's Anglican Church. The congregation had been in existence for around forty years, having services in the schoolhouse. In 1910, a large shed was added to the ground for horses and in 1930 a parish hall was built.

After the 1930s, Newbliss began to decline. By 1950, Newbliss had only 25 residents and only a church, post office, school, general store and restaurant in operation within the community. Currently, none of the original businesses are still conducting business here.

==== Luckey murders ====
On October 8, 1892, the community of Newbliss was the scene of a triple homicide. Charles Sanford Luckey, was released from the Central Prison in Toronto and made his way to Newbliss, Ontario where his father, John Luckey and his second-wife Martha Luckey lived in a farmhouse with their daughter Mary Ann "Minnie" Luckey. Charles had just served a year for larceny and was known to be on bad terms with his father.

Shortly after two o'clock in the afternoon, neighbours noticed smoke emanating from the Luckey farmhouse. When they arrived on scene, the neighbours realized the entire interior of the house was completely engulfed in flames. While the fire was being attended to, some neighbours attempted to enter the farmhouse in order to rescue the family; when they got to the building every window and door was secured shut. When entrance was finally gained, the bodies of John, Martha and Mary Ann Luckey were discovered, having been severely burned to the point they were unrecognizable, and were removed from the farmhouse. The house then burned completely to the ground. The neighbours immediately suspected murder followed by arson due to the locked windows, the nature of the fire and the fact two axes were found at the scene.

According to residents' accounts in a Smiths Falls newspaper from October 13, 1892, a strange man was seen by many lurking around the farmhouse. Since Martha was home alone, it was believed amongst the neighbours that she must have been murdered first, followed by John who was seen running errands shortly before the fire. It was assumed that Mary Ann was killed last as her teeth were found in the driveway, indicative of a struggle, as though she may have foreseen danger and attempted escape.

Charles Luckey was a suspect due to the known tension between himself and his father, coupled with his criminal past. To add to the suspicion, he was later found in Smiths Falls, a short distance from Newbliss, staying in a hotel under an alias. When questioned, blood was found on his clothing and he admitted to being in Newbliss earlier in the day. The police chief also noted he seemed to be apathetic to the murders of his family.

Charles Luckey was found guilty of the murders, and sentenced to be executed. On December 14, 1893, Charles Luckey was hanged in Brockville, Ontario. Luckey's last meal was a bun and tea before he read from the bible, recited hymns, then was marched to the scaffold for his execution.

=== Former localities, settlements or communities ===
There are many sources which reference communities or localities within the township that are unrecorded on contemporary maps or no longer in use. According to a local history, there was a settlement called Shane's Corners located along Highway 29. Statistics Canada also provides the names of further localities no longer in use or not listed on contemporary maps: Bell, Bells Crossing, Glen Elm, Gosford, Hawkens, Heather Heights, Hutton, Linden Bank, and Story.

==== Shane's Corners ====
Shane's Corners was a small settlement located along Highway 29 near what was the First Concession of Kitley. Shane's Corners was settled by a man named Lawrence Shane and his wife; Mrs. Shane kept a private school here at one time. The settlement consisted of a few homesteads and very few businesses.

The settlement was large enough that it was able to become its own school section in the late nineteenth century. The school was known as S.S. #2 Shane's School, and at the time was located along the boundary of Kitley and South Elmsley townships. The stone building was constructed in 1875, replacing an older school further down the road which was subject to arson, possibly committed by a pupil. The schoolhouse was used after hours as the community church, as well as a meeting hall. Well into the 1900s, the building was used by the Shane's Women's Institute.

In 1860, the settlement became home to a Temperance Hall, called Mount Albion Lodge No. 60, I.O.G.T., and located on the first concession.

In the late 1800s, Shane's Corners had its own cheese factory, Cameron's Cheese Factory. This factory was originally built on a local homestead, however was later moved to the lot across the road from Shane's School, a more central location.

At some point in the 1800s, an Anglican cemetery was established.

== Demographics ==
In the 2021 Census of Population conducted by Statistics Canada, Elizabethtown-Kitley had a population of 9,545 living in 3,791 of its 4,029 total private dwellings, a change of −0.9% from its 2016 population of 9,631. With a land area of 555.96 km^{2} (214.66 sq mi), it had a population density of 17.2/km^{2} (44.5/sq mi) in 2021.

Canada census – Elizabethtown-Kitley community profile

	2021	2016	2011
Population	9,545 (-0.9% from 2016)	9,854 (+1.3% from 2011)	9,724 (-4.7% from 2006)
Land area	555.96 km^{2} (214.66 sq mi)	557.71 km^{2} (215.33 sq mi)	557.80 km^{2} (215.37 sq mi)
Population density	17.2/km^{2} (45/sq mi)	17.7/km^{2} (46/sq mi)	17.4/km^{2} (45/sq mi)
Median age	51.2 (M: 50.8, F: 51.2)	49.9 (M: 49.2, F: 50.7)	47.4 (M: 46.9, F: 47.9)
Private dwellings	4,029 (total) 3,791 (occupied)	3,988 (total)	3862 (total)
Median household income	$91,000	$78,455

References: 2021 2016 2011

Historical census populations – Elizabethtown-Kitley
Year	Pop.	±%
2001	10,039	—
2006	10,201	+1.6%
2011	9,724	−4.7%
2016	9,854	+1.3%
2021	9,545	−3.1%
Population counts are not adjusted for boundary changes. Source: Statistics Canada

Mother tongue (2021):

- English as first language: 94.0%
- French as first language: 2.4%
- English and French as first language: 0.4%
- Other as first language: 2.9%

=== 2011 census ===
In the year 2011, 19.6% of Elizabethtown-Kitley's population was aged 65 years or older. around two percent higher than the national percentage. 65.8% of the population were of working age (aged 15–64), while 14.6% were under 14 years of age. The national percentage for those aged 0–14 was 16.7% and 68.5% for working aged individuals. The median age in the township in 2011 was 47.4 years old, seven years older than the national average.

Age groups	Both sexes	Male	Female
0–14	14.6%	14.1%	15.0%
15–64	65.8%	67.8%	63.9%
65+	19.6%	18.2%	21.2%

In 2011, the number of census families in the township of Elizabethtown-Kitley had dropped 3.9% from 2006 to 2,945 families. Of these families, 79.1% were married couples while 11.9% were common-law and 9.2% were single-parent households. Among the couples in this census division in 2011, 41.7% of couples were with children aged 24 years or younger living in the household; this was below the national numbers.

For the total population aged 15 or older during 2011, the marital statuses in the township break down as follows: 57.5% were married, 8.4% were living with a common-law partner, 8% were widowed, 6% were divorced or separated and 20% were single (never married).

Married couples with children	985
Married couples without children	1,345
Common-law couples with children	130
Common law couples without children	215

==== Language, immigration and diversity ====
In the township in 2011, the vast majority, 93.8%, of the population spoke solely English as their mother tongue. Only 2.4% reported speaking only French and 3.4% reported speaking only a non-official language as their mother tongue. This is a contrast from national percentages which are 68.2% for English only and 25.7% for non-official languages only as a mother tongue. Multiple responses were given by 0.4% of the population.

In 2011, 98.3% of the population spoke English as their primary language at home; 0.8% spoke French and 0.5% spoke a non-official language in their home.

Of non-official languages, Dutch, German and Italian were cited as being the most common languages spoken. Dutch speakers accounted for 42.4% of the non-official language speakers. German accounted for 18.2% and Italian 4.5%.

Knowledge of official languages	Number	Percentage
Total	9,325	100%
English only	8,495	91.1%
French only	0	0.0%
English and French	825	8.8%
Neither	10	0.1%

In the year 2011, only 155 individuals (1.7%) of the population of Elizabethtown-Kitley township identified with an Aboriginal identity. Of the individuals with an Aboriginal identity, 58.1% reported having a First Nations identity while 41.9% reported Métis.

During 2011, it was estimated that 90 individuals within Elizabethtown-Kitley belonged to a visible minority group. This accounted for 1.0% of the township's total population; in Ontario, the percentage is 25.9%. The biggest visible minority groups were South Asian and Black.

The three most reported ethnic origins in 2011 in Elizabethtown-Kitley were Canadian (43.6%), Irish (35.5%), and English (31.5%).

In 2011, the National Household Survey determined that 8,725 individuals in the township were Canadian-born, accounting for 94.2% of the total population. 525 individuals, 5.7% of the population, were foreign-born immigrants. Recent immigrants, those who immigrated between 2006 and 2011, accounted for 5.7% of the immigrant population. The most common countries of origin for the immigrant population of the township were the United Kingdom and the Netherlands who accounted for 39% and 19% of the population of immigrants, respectively.

== Cemeteries ==
The amalgamated townships of Elizabethtown-Kitley are dotted with numerous old cemeteries, many of which lay abandoned. There are a total of 67 cemeteries recorded in the township. The majority of these cemeteries are old family burying ground dating from the late 1700s to the early 1800s - a time when burying the dead on the family's land was common. Many have been fully transcribed through local volunteer efforts however many are not, possibly due to the fact the stones are now illegible from deterioration. Most of the old family burial plots are completely abandoned or located on private properties. Additionally, the Brockville cemeteries are located within Elizabethtown-Kitley.

The following is an incomplete list of all registered cemeteries recorded as being within Elizabethtown-Kitley township by the Ontario Genealogical Society (many of these cemeteries are also known by other or multiple names; the names listed here are those specified by the Ontario Genealogical Society):

- Bell's
- Hill
- Bell
- Weir
- Earl
- Lucas
- Smith
- Jelly's
- Booth
- Bolton
- Bolton
- Soper's
- Forbes'
- Lehigh
- Toledo
- Gosford
- Cornell
- Foxton
- Horton
- Oakland
- Howard's
- Campbell
- Campbell's
- Brennan's
- Manhard
- Fernbank
- Davidson
- Sherwood
- Glen Buell
- Browntown
- Ellis Family
- Whitehurst
- Greenback
- New Dublin
- Sopertown
- Blanchard's
- Plum Hollow
- Mallorytown
- David Family
- Livingstone's
- Old Greenbush
- Fulford Pioneer
- Bellamy's Pond
- Rowsome Place
- Tincap/Sand Hill
- Dayton/Livingston
- St. Phillip Neri R.C.
- Davis Family Plot
- Davis (abandoned)
- Davis (abandoned)
- Davis (abandoned)
- Toledo Presbyterian
- Hanton (abandoned)
- Weeks (abandoned)
- Toledo United Church
- Acheson (abandoned)
- Forthton (abandoned)
- Gallinger (abandoned)
- unnamed (abandoned)
- unnamed (abandoned)
- St. Francis Xavier R.C.
- Brockville Old Protestant
- Montgomery (abandoned)
- St. Peter's Anglican/Old Catholic

Fulford Pioneer Cemetery is a designated historical location situated along the bank of the St. Lawrence River along Fulford Point Road, Woodridge, west of Brockville. It was designated for being one of the oldest cemeteries in the township, having been dedicated in 1786. The cemetery is on land originally granted to one of Jessup's Rangers, Jonathan Fulford. On June 7, 1786, the cemetery was opened with the burial of Fulford's infant son. The cemetery contains the graves of members of Fulford's family as well as the Cole family, who were related through marriage, and a few other local families.

== See also ==
- List of townships in Ontario
