= United Counties of Leeds and Grenville =

Leeds Grenville
- County (upper-tier)
- United Counties of Leeds and Grenville
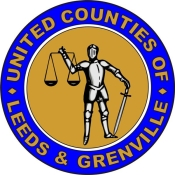
- Seal Logo

- Location of Leeds and Grenville United Counties
- Coordinates: 44°50′N 75°40′W
- Country: Canada
- Province: Ontario
- Region: Eastern Ontario
- Formed: 1 January 1850
- County seat: Brockville
- Municipalities: List: Township of Athens; Township of Augusta; Township of Edwardsburgh/Cardinal; Township of Elizabethtown-Kitley; Township of Front of Yonge; Township of Leeds and the Thousand Islands; Municipality (township) of North Grenville; Township of Rideau Lakes; Village of Merrickville-Wolford; Village of Westport

Government
  - Type: Upper-tier municipality
  - Warden: Corinna Smith-Gatcke

Area
  - Land: 3,322.75 km^{2} (1,282.92 sq mi)
  - Census division: 3,355.61 km^{2} (1,295.61 sq mi)
- Land area excludes Brockville, Gananoque, and Prescott

Population (2021)
  - Total: 72,493
  - Density: 21.8/km^{2} (56/sq mi)
  - Census division: 104,070
  - Census division density: 31/km^{2} (80/sq mi)
- Total excludes Brockville, Gananoque, and Prescott
- Time zone: UTC−05:00 (EST)
  - Summer (DST): UTC−04:00 (EDT)
- Website: www.leedsandgrenville.ca

The United Counties of Leeds and Grenville, commonly known as Leeds and Grenville, is a county and census division in Ontario, Canada, in the Eastern Ontario subregion of Southern Ontario. It fronts on the St. Lawrence River and the international boundary between Canada and the United States, opposite of the State of New York. The county seat is Brockville. The county was formed by the union of the historical counties of Leeds and Grenville in 1850.

== Subdivisions ==
There are 10 municipalities in Leeds and Grenville (in order of population):

- Municipality of North Grenville (part of Grenville sub-region)
- Township of Rideau Lakes (part of Leeds sub-region)
- Township of Elizabethtown-Kitley (part of Leeds sub-region)
- Township of Leeds and the Thousand Islands (part of Leeds sub-region)
- Township of Augusta (part of Grenville sub-region)
- Township of Edwardsburgh/Cardinal (part of Grenville sub-region)
- Village of Merrickville–Wolford (part of Grenville sub-region)
- Township of Athens (part of Leeds sub-region)
- Township of Front of Yonge (part of Leeds sub-region)
- Village of Westport (part of Leeds sub-region)

The city of Brockville and towns of Gananoque and Prescott are part of the Leeds and Grenville census division but are independent of the county.

== Historical townships ==
- Leeds County
  - Bastard (now part of Rideau Lakes)
  - Elizabethtown (now part of Elizabethtown-Kitley)
  - Front of Escott (now part of Leeds and the Thousand Islands)
  - Front of Leeds and Lansdowne (now part of Leeds and the Thousand Islands)
  - Front of Yonge (still exists)
  - Kitley (now part of Elizabethtown-Kitley)
  - North Crosby (now part of Rideau Lakes)
  - Rear of Escott (now part of Athens)
  - Rear of Leeds and Lansdowne (now part of Leeds and the Thousand Islands)
  - Rear of Yonge (now part of Athens)
  - South Burgess (now part of Rideau Lakes)
  - South Crosby (now part of Rideau Lakes)
  - South Elmsley (now part of Rideau Lakes)
- Grenville County
  - Augusta (still exists)
  - Edwardsburgh (still exists as part of Edwardsburgh/Cardinal)
  - Oxford (now part of North Grenville)
  - South Gower (now part of North Grenville)
  - Smiths Falls (south end of town, while most of Smiths Falls is located in Lanark County)
  - Wolford (still exists as part of Merrickville-Wolford)

== Demographics ==
As a census division in the 2021 Census of Population conducted by Statistics Canada, the United Counties of Leeds and Grenville had a population of 104,070 living in 44,618 of its 49,557 total private dwellings, a change of 3.5% from its 2016 population of 100,527. With a land area of 3,355.61 km^{2} (1,295.61 sq mi), it had a population density of 31.0/km^{2} (80.3/sq mi) in 2021.

Canada census – Leeds and Grenville census division community profile

	2021	2016	2011
Population	104,070 (+3.5% from 2016)	100,546 (+1.2% from 2011)	99,306 (0.1% from 2006)
Land area	3,355.61 km^{2} (1,295.61 sq mi)	3,382.89 km^{2} (1,306.14 sq mi)	3,383.92 km^{2} (1,306.54 sq mi)
Population density	31.0/km^{2} (80/sq mi)	29.7/km^{2} (77/sq mi)	29.3/km^{2} (76/sq mi)
Median age	50.8 (M: 49.6, F: 52.0)	49.3 (M: 48.4, F: 50.2)	46.7 (M: 45.8, F: 47.4)
Private dwellings	49,557 (total) 44,618 (occupied)	48.226 (total) 42,749 (occupied)	45,938 (total)
Median household income	$82,000	$68,305

Notes: Includes separated municipalities.
References: 2021 2016 2011

Historical census populations – United Counties of Leeds and Grenville

Year	Pop.	±%
1921	51,553	—
1931	51,484	−0.1%
1941	52,031	+1.1%
1951	55,876	+7.4%
1956	63,640	+13.9%
1961	69,753	+9.6%

Year	Pop.	±%
1966	72,558	+4.0%
1971	74,409	+2.6%
1976	78,604	+5.6%
1981	80,941	+3.0%
1986	84,582	+4.5%
1991	90,235	+6.7%

Year	Pop.	±%
1996	96,284	+6.7%
2001	96,606	+0.3%
2006	99,206	+2.7%
2011	99,306	+0.1%
2016	100,546	+1.2%
2021	104,070	+3.5%

Population counts are not adjusted for boundary changes.
Source: Statistics Canada

== Courthouse ==
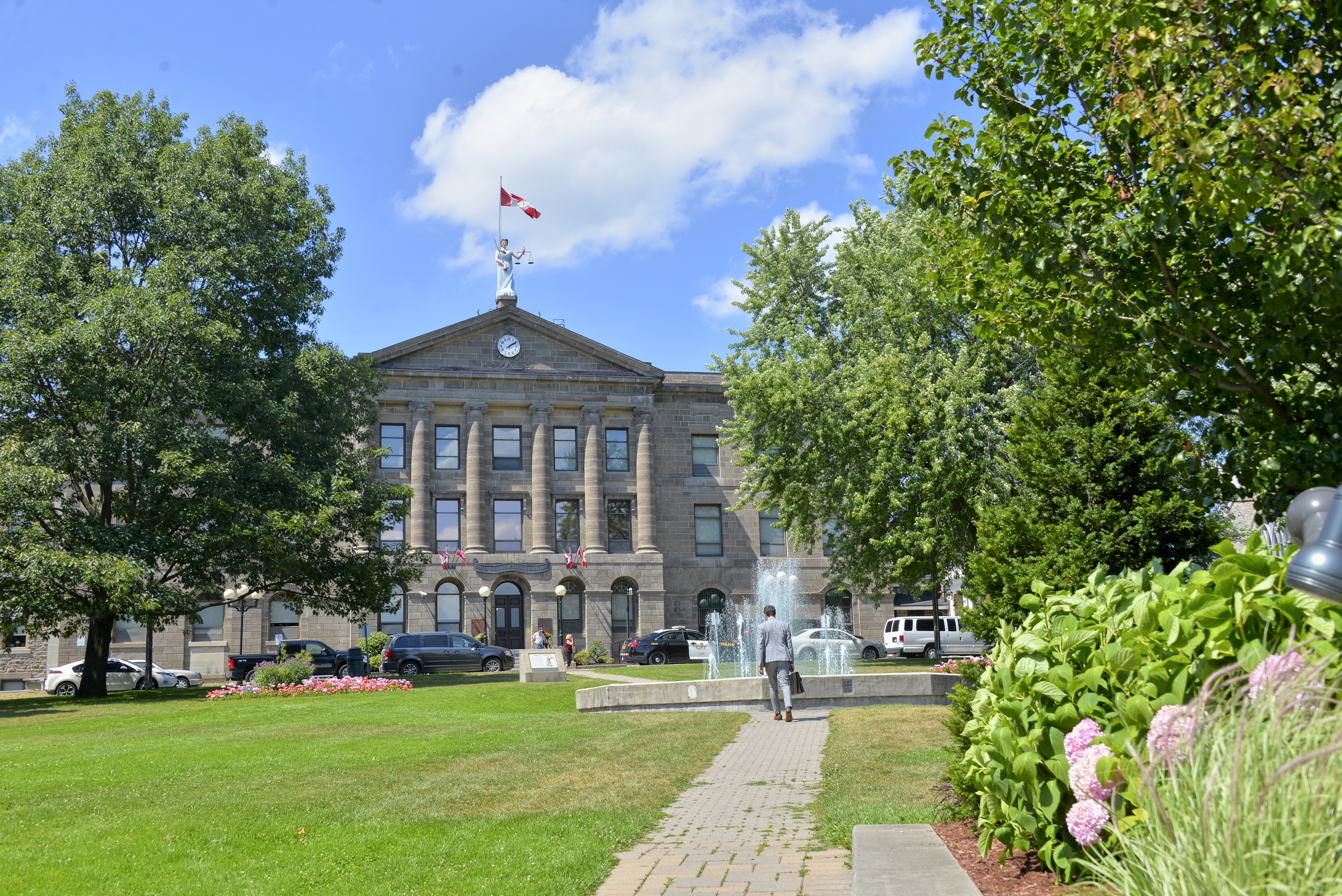
County courthouse in Brockville

William Buell granted the land for construction of the Brockville Courthouse atop a hill rising from the Saint Lawrence River. A broad boulevard extends to the main street. One of the oldest courthouses in Ontario, it was erected in 1842. The original plan had been to build one in Johnstown Township, but the land there was too swampy. Instead, it was built in Elizabethtown Township.

The figure of Themis, a blindfolded woman holding the scales of justice, was made by master carver William Holmes in 1844. This statue was named "Sally Grant" by Paul Glasford, the chair of the building committee, in honour of the woman who posed as the model. It was erected in 1845, damaged by Hurricane Hazel in 1954 and rotting by 1956. The original is on display at a Westport museum. A replica carved by Robert Kerr of Smiths Falls was placed atop the courthouse in 1982.

== Transportation ==
=== Major highways ===
- Highway 15
- Highway 137
- Highway 401
- Highway 416

=== Bus and Rail connection ===
Brockville is serviced by Via Rail, as well as intercity bus service. There is local public transit in Brockville, and on-demand transit in North Grenville.

=== Canal ===
Since 1832 the Rideau Canal was a major freight transport route. Since the 1960s however, it has been used exclusively for pleasure craft.

== Notes ==
The town of Smiths Falls is mostly located in Lanark County, while parts of the southern areas of the town are in the township of Rideau Lakes in the United Counties of Leeds and Grenville.

== See also ==
- List of municipalities in Ontario
- List of townships in Ontario
- Union, Leeds and Grenville United Counties, Ontario
- List of secondary schools in Ontario#Leeds and Grenville United Counties
