= Edwardsburgh/Cardinal =

- Township (lower-tier)
- Township of Edwardsburgh/Cardinal
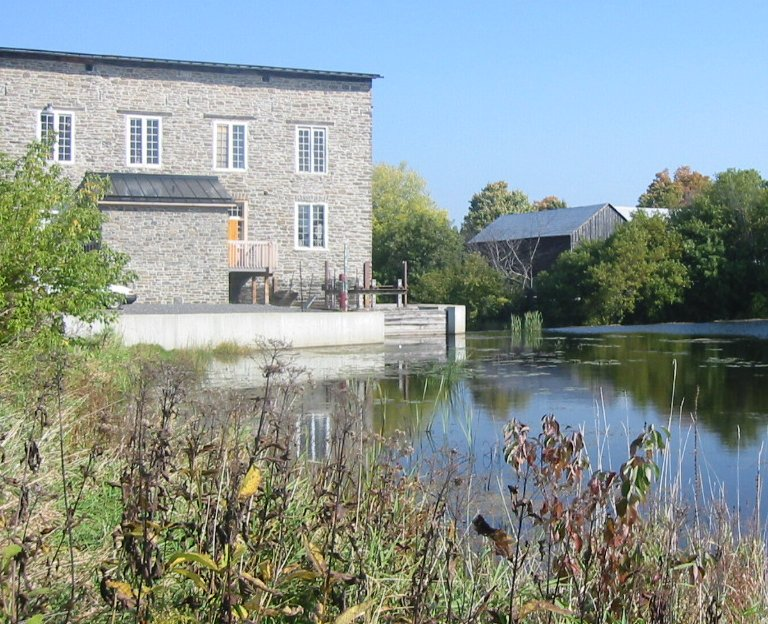
- Old grist mill, Spencerville

- Location within United Counties of Leeds and Grenville Location within Southern Ontario
- Coordinates: 44°50′N 75°30′W
- Country: Canada
- Province: Ontario
- County: Leeds and Grenville
- Incorporated: 2001

Government
  - Type: Township
  - Mayor: Tory Deschamps
  - Fed. riding: Leeds—Grenville—Thousand Islands—Rideau Lakes
  - Prov. riding: Leeds—Grenville—Thousand Islands and Rideau Lakes

Area
  - Land: 309.91 km^{2} (119.66 sq mi)

Population (2021)
  - Total: 7,505
  - Density: 24.2/km^{2} (63/sq mi)
- Time zone: UTC– 05:00 (EST)
  - Summer (DST): UTC– 04:00 (EDT)
- Postal Code FSA: K0E
- Area codes: 613, 343
- Website: www.twpec.ca

Edwardsburgh/Cardinal is a township in the United Counties of Leeds and Grenville of eastern Ontario, Canada. It is situated along the St. Lawrence River and extends back into rural hamlets. Both Highway 416 and Highway 401 pass through the township, as well as the South Nation River.

The Township of Edwardsburgh/Cardinal was formed on January 1, 2001, through the amalgamation of Edwardsburgh Township with the Village of Cardinal. Edwardsburgh Township was first surveyed in 1783, and incorporated in 1850. The township was part of the historical Grenville County before it merged with Leeds County to form the United Counties in the 19th century.

The township's main population centres are Cardinal, Johnstown, and Spencerville. The township's administrative offices are located in Spencerville.

== Geography ==
Edwardsburgh/Cardinal's southern boundary is the Saint Lawrence River's shore. To the west, the township ends at the boundary for Augusta Township and to the east is the neighbouring United Counties of Stormont, Dundas and Glengarry. To the north of the township is the township of North Grenville. The township covers an area of 312 km^{2} (120 sq mi). The township belongs to the Great Lakes–Saint Lawrence lowlands region.

Despite the township's proximity to the Saint Lawrence River, only ten percent of the area's water drains into the Saint Lawrence, and ninety percent drains into the South Nation River. The flow of the South Nation River through this area is described as very sluggish with poor drainage, due to the fact there is little drop in elevation along the river; this leads to the formation of bogs and swamps, and also makes the area prone to seasonal flooding. The north-west section of the township is known as the Groveton Bog, and to the east is known as the Hellgate Swamp. The soils in the area range from sandy and dry, to dark and acidic closer to the swamp areas.

=== Topography ===
The majority of the township is covered in only a very thin layer of soil, in spite of this, there are very few rock outcrops in the area. The only notable outcrop within the township is along the Saint Lawrence river in New Wexford. None of the bedrock in the township contains phosphates, metalliferous ores, mica or anything else of notable value; the sands in the area are also of little value as they are too silty and fine to be used as building material. There is, however, a high concentration of stones in much of the local soil, making it suitable for gravel. The area had a few limestone quarries, but the output of these quarries were small and only used locally.

Up until the 18th century, the land was covered with thick, mature, mixed forests. The original forest was almost completely cleared throughout the years and the forest that stands today is mostly secondary growth over previously cleared land. The forests in the area presently contain numerous types of deciduous, oak, birch, ash and maple trees. The common coniferous trees in the area include many types of pine and cedar as well as balsam fir and white spruce. In the darker, acidic soils around the bogs and swamps there are tamarack trees, as well as juniper and black spruce. Wild grape, Virginia creeper, and other woody vines are native to the area.

== History ==
=== Prehistoric era ===
According to archaeologists, the earliest human activity in the area surrounding Edwardsburgh/Cardinal can be traced back to approximately 11,000 years ago, after the retreat of a glacier first made the land inhabitable; this era is known as the Paleo-Indian period.

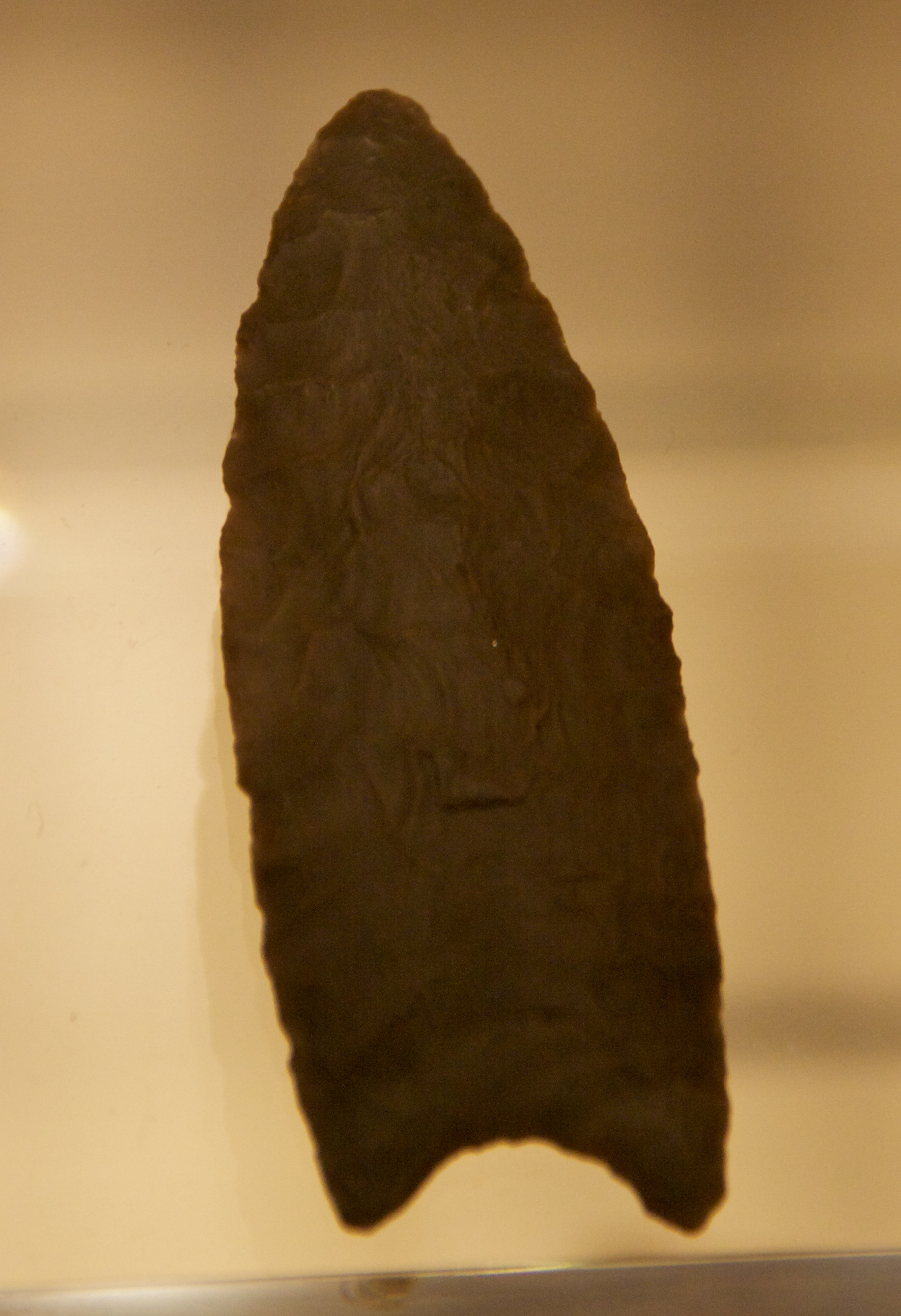
Clovis spear point, in a British Museum, similar to those found in Edwardsburgh/Cardinal

Numerous stone arrowheads have been excavated within the region and can be traced to the Clovis people, as well as the Plano people. Although no habitation sites have been discovered within the township boundaries, it is suggested that these cultures must have hunted in the Edwardsburgh/Cardinal area during this time. The Clovis arrows found within the region vary greatly, and reflect thousands of years of the Clovis people's progression and a changing environment. The earlier weapons were short dart-points, while two to three thousand years later, the Clovis people were mostly carving stone spear-points. This is indicative of an increase in larger game animals migrating into the area. There is little evidence of these cultures ever existing, as their footprint on the land was virtually invisible, and the population density during this period was very low. No human remains have survived from this time period making it impossible to determine the physical appearance of the cultures.

The period following the Paleo-Indian Period was known as the Archaic Period. From 5000 to 1000 BCE the eastern Ontario region was dominated by the Laurentian Archaic people, who were direct descendants of the Plano people. This culture was far more sophisticated than its ancestors; a result of a warmer climate and the emergence of modern flora and fauna. Current archaeological findings cannot show us any evidence as to how the culture housed or sheltered themselves. Although their diet consisted of mostly fish and plants, the Laurentians were also big game hunters of deer, elk, and even bear. In contrast to their ancestors who used rough, chipped stone tools, the Laurentians are known to have used polished stone tools for hunting and woodworking.

Excavations of human remains revealed they were a violent culture; humans remains from this period have been found to be decapitated, have skull fractures or stone projectiles embedded into the bones. These excavations also suggested that the Laurentian Archaic people were a ritualized culture as some of their dead were sprinkled with red ochre and a wide range of goods, which also presumably represented status within the culture. Some of the goods and artifacts found buried alongside the Laurentians were not native to the area, meaning they must have traded goods frequently with other people. It is likely that the decapitated or otherwise brutalized remains are those of outside traders who threatened or attacked the Laurentian Archaic people.

=== Later history ===
In 1673, the French, working with indigenous tribes from the area, built a storehouse on Old Breeches River, now known as Johnstown Creek. This storehouse was used to hold supplies en route to upriver trading posts such as Fort Frontenac (now, Kingston) until 1758. In 1759, The French settlers built Fort de Lévis on Chimney Island, in the Saint Lawrence River just off of Johnstown, between it and Ogdensburg. The purpose of this fort was to protect the Saint Lawrence River from the British. It was captured by Major-General Jeffrey Amherst in August 1760 during the Battle of the Thousand Islands. The island on which the fort once stood was permanently flooded during the construction of the Saint Lawrence Seaway.

In 1784, British loyalists from the United States arrived, fleeing the American Revolution. The first settlement of 166 settled in Royal Township No. 6 (subsequently renamed Edwardsburg) at Johnstown, named after Sir William Johnson, an Irish-born British Army official in the British empire. By 1789, the loyalists had built a town site in one-acre lots, with streets named after the family of George III. It remains so today, with the exception of one street.

The drawing of lots in Edwardsburgh was unusual in that every loyalist head-of-household drew from a hat, giving one and all an equal chance at receiving the most desirable piece of land, close to the river at the front of the settlement.

== Communities ==
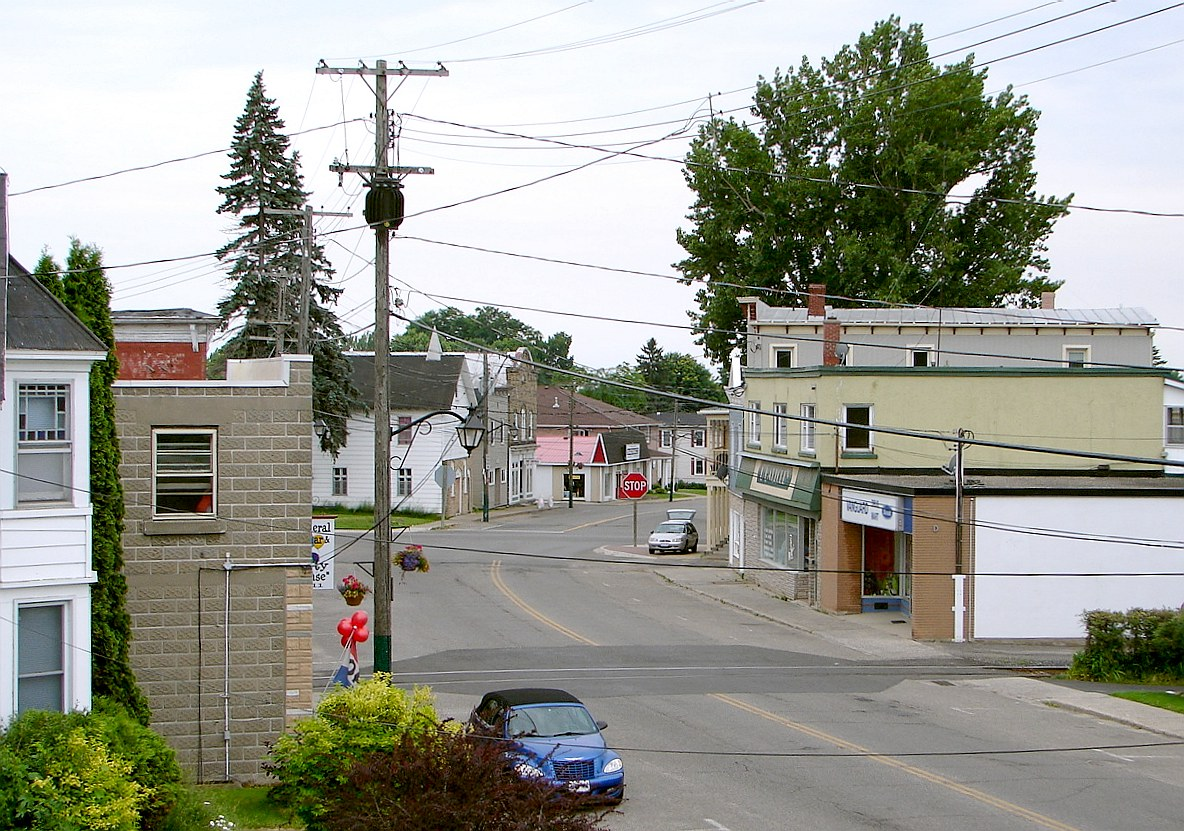
Cardinal

In addition to the main population centres of Cardinal, Johnstown, and Spencerville, the township of Edwardsburgh/Cardinal is dotted with many rural hamlets and communities, including Brouseville, New Wexford, Crystal Rock, Ventnor, Hyndman, Mainsville, Groveton, Campbell's Corners, McCarley's Corners, The Island, McReynolds, Pittston, Van Allens, Glen Smail, and Shanly. Most of these hamlets date back to the early 1800s, and are tiny and only ever had a few farms and less than twenty businesses. Each hamlet usually had its own schoolhouse, cheese factory, and churches; many had their own general stores, burial grounds, as well as grist or saw mills.

=== Brouseville ===
Brouseville, Ontario is a small rural hamlet located approximately 4 mi (6.4 km) north of Cardinal. The central location of the hamlet is the intersection of Brouseville Road and County Road 22. Brouseville extends easterly to the township boundary, and Kain Road is considered to be the southern boundary of the community. Brouseville, formerly known as Bolton's Corners, was renamed in 1872 after Dr. William H. Brouse, a local travelling physician. Brouse took over the South Grenville seat in the 1872 federal election which prompted residents to change the name in his honour.

Brouseville was settled many years later than neighbouring settlements of similar size; until the mid-1800s, the community consisted of solely homesteads or farms established by a handful of families. At this time, the community was called Bolton's Corners after the Bolton family, a notably large family who were amongst the first to settle here. By the 1860s, Brouseville became a thriving community with many businesses in operation typical of the era; Brouseville had a hotel, a jewellery store, four grocery stores, a pump shop, a blacksmith, as well as a carriage repair shop in operation. By the late 1800s, a post office had been established.

Sporting events became popular with the creation of an outdoor "arena", operated and maintained by locals. Brouseville organized its own hockey team, as well as a soccer and softball team, which competed against the teams of neighbouring communities. These events were highly organized and results were reported by local media.

In 1870, William Anderson constructed a horse-racing track on his property in Brouseville. Anderson was a well-respected horse trader who raised thoroughbreds and offered training at his track until 1900. Frank James, brother of outlaw Jesse James, frequented this horse track and maintained a friendship with Anderson; James was a regular customer, buying several horses from Anderson over the years and staying at his home during his visits.

A notable piece of architecture belonging to the hamlet was an octagon house that once stood on Byers Road. The house was believed to have been built by a "Mr. Wright" in 1873, following the fad of octagonal houses built in the United States. The house remained abandoned for many years after it was purchased by the Land Bank. Numerous efforts were made to have the distinctive house designated a heritage building to preserve it, however the outcry was largely ignored. On October 31, 1995, the house was destroyed by fire and later completely demolished.

By the end of the 1800s, Brouseville remained largely unchanged; the same businesses were still in operation with the addition of a long distance telephone line constructed by the Bell Telephone Company of Canada. In 1904, a manager was appointed and an office was built where the community could make or receive long-distance phone calls; residential phones were unavailable in Brouseville until later.

In the early 1900s, Brouseville established its first school, fairly late into its settlement. Prior to this, students had to travel long distances to neighbouring communities. Residents of the community demanded their own school section but were met with opposition from neighbouring schools, which relied on the revenue provided by Brouseville taxpayers. In 1905, Brouseville was finally designated its own school section, #6; the school was dubbed S.S. No. 6 Brouseville School. A red brick schoolhouse, modern for the time, was built on the southeast corner of the community's main intersection. The school contained a basement, large furnace, and seating for 50 pupils. The school remained open until 1971 during which time schoolhouses were phased out in favour of larger schools. The schoolhouse in Brouseville became a multi-purpose building, used after school hours as both a church and community hall. Numerous social gatherings were organized and held in the schoolhouse from quilting bees and box socials to concerts and live music. After the school's closure, the building remained in use as a community building before it was sold to become a private residence.

Brouseville saw a steady decline in business into the mid-1900s when improved infrastructure and technology ended the necessity of small, self-sustaining communities. Currently, the village of Brouseville has no businesses located within its boundaries and is largely a residential community. Despite the closure of every business, the population of Brouseville has been continuously increasing since the start of settlement. In recent years, new homes have been sporadically built within the community of Brouseville.

=== Campbell's Corners ===
Campbell's Corners, Ontario, is the name given to a small settlement located close to the community of Hyndman. The community was originally called Campbell's Mills, as the settlement was formed around a mill established by a Hector Campbell, whose family was one of the first to settle the area in the early 1800s. Campbell's Corners was most prosperous during the mid-to-late 19th century when pioneer industries like mills could thrive; during this time, the mill attracted settlement and immigration, and an agricultural community grew around the milling industry.

During the 19th century, the Campbell family operated a large sawmill, producing shingles, lumber, and boxes for the local cheese factories as well as containing a separate gristmill; the mill, operated by steam engine, employed around six individuals – four adults and two younger individuals – with wages around $700 annually. Early into the settlement, a small burying ground was established on a local farm; few details are known about its use and the grave markers were removed over half a century ago.

By the mid-1800s, the community still had few businesses of its own apart from the mills, and instead relied on neighbouring communities for most services; the only other business recorded as being in operation in Campbell's Corners was a general store, which is said to have operated briefly at the end of the century. Residents of Campbell's Corners would have used the post office and cheese factory in Hyndman, and travelled to other communities for additional services. Residents who were not employed by the mill sustained themselves through farming operations or by working in construction for the railway.

In the 1840s prior to the designation of school sections, a school was built between Hyndman and Campbell's Corners. The first schoolhouse was constructed of log, and a decade after its construction had fallen into disrepair. By 1852, the community had been designated as a school section which was shared with Hyndman, known as S.S. No. 17. The log schoolhouse was replaced by a frame structure with brick veneer built at a cost of $430 including the land purchase; the school was referred to as S.S. No. 17 Campbell's Mills School. When the school was rebuilt, it was also relocated further west along Hyndman Road at the corner of the road leading to the Campbell family's mill. In 1875, Hyndman and Campbell's Corners were divided into two school sections; Campbell's Mills School remained S.S. No. 17 and used the existing schoolhouse, while Hyndman became S.S. No. 23 and required a new school. In 1914, S.S. No. 17 underwent minor renovations inside and outside; the structure was covered with clapboard and the furniture and interior floor were replaced. In 1964, the school closed due to lack of enrolment caused by improvements in transportation and the construction of larger, modern schools nearby.

In 1880, the mill at Campbell's Corners was destroyed by fire; however, it was promptly rebuilt with the efforts of the entire community. In 1914, the building was destroyed a second time, again by a fire which also destroyed a barn and two homes located on the property; the mill was not rebuilt at this time, as the industry was in steady decline. With the closure of the mills and the general store, Campbell's Corners became a completely residential community by the mid-20th century. Presently the community still consists entirely of private homes, some of which are modern, having been built overtop of old farms.

=== Crystal Rock (Limekiln) ===
Crystal Rock, Ontario is a community located along County Road 44, directly north of Johnstown. The settlement was first called Gore's Hill, then Limekiln before being changed to Crystal Rock in the 1900s. The land was first surveyed for Loyalist settlement by Edward Jessup in 1784 however it was predominately Irish immigrants who settled and established the community. Before 1784, the land was occupied by many small First Nations communities. Largely forced out by the Europeans, the few aboriginals who stayed in Crystal Rock traded handmade goods with the early settlers. Clay beads, bowls and pipes were commonly found scattered throughout the land.

In the early 1800s, land at Crystal Rock was slowly doled out to disbanded Loyalists as grants. Early landholders cleared the lots of timber and shipped it to Montreal for profit with no intention of settlement. The timber trade ceased in 1820 and Crystal Rock was abandoned. Settlement began at Crystal Rock in the 1830s with an influx of Irish immigrants. Few settlers received clear title to the land they occupied as much of it was clergy reserve land. Some opted to become tenants while others simply squatted. The land in Crystal Rock is sandy with large limestone outcroppings making traditional farming difficult. Wheat, hops and rye became staple crops, being the most productive and easily sold to nearby breweries and distilleries. Many settlers sought employment outside of agriculture, working as labourers during the construction of the canals and railways or as rivermen.

During the 1830s, the Gore family established a large homestead at the intersection of County Road 44 and Brouseville Road. Gore's farm was of the first in the area and included lime pits and a limekiln. The prominent farm led to the community's early designation of Gore's Hill and inspired the construction of numerous other limekilns which the settlement became known and named for. At night the light of the kilns was allegedly visible from a distance creating the illusion the area was glowing.

Around 1840, the first schoolhouse was built from logs on property owned by a Daniel Mills. Prior to this a teacher tutored children from their home for a fee. Sunday school was held here after hours for Methodist and Anglican congregations until the 1850s. When the township split into school sections, Crystal Rock was designated section No. 8 and the school was recorded as ‘Common School S.S. #8’. In 1865, records indicate a section of land was sold to school trustees by Joseph Dyer for unspecified school use, on which was a log schoolhouse. Records are unclear as to whether the land was sold to extend the grounds of the existing school, or if the building was a newly constructed replacement. By 1865, the school was referred to by S.S. No. 8 Limekiln School. In 1870, a local man was hired to build a stone schoolhouse to replace the log building with a toilet and woodshed on the premises. In the 1880s the school's well water was deemed unsafe after many students fell ill. The unsanitary conditions of the school were attributed to the deaths of a few pupils in 1909. The toilets were then demolished and the school was cleaned and repaired. The school closed by 1961 and was sold to the church before becoming a private residence, as it remains today.

By the 1850s around 700 acres (2.8 km^{2}) were being cultivated by the community and two taverns had opened. In 1868, a Loyal Orange Lodge group built an Orange Hall which also held Anglican and Methodist services before churches were built. The frame hall was later used as a community meeting hall. By the late-1800s, Crystal Rock was a thriving farming community home to numerous pioneer industries. Tradesmen including a blacksmith, shoemaker, mechanic, cooper and two carpenters, one of whom solely constructed coffins, serviced the community. A shingle and a cheese factory were constructed. The cheese factory was built in 1884 at the corner of Brouseville Road by a trio of locals. The factory, called Thompson's Cheese Factory No. 5 after one of its owners, was later upgraded to produce butter.

The community established two churches along County Road 44 by the late-1800s to service pre-existing Anglican and Methodist congregations. Crystal Rock also had a Roman Catholic congregation which was too small to support a church and instead held services in local homes. In 1877 the Limekiln Methodist Church was built with volunteer labour and donated materials. The dark-yellow frame church held bi-weekly services and a weekly Sunday school. In 1916 the church was painted blue and windows from a church dismantled in Roebuck replaced the originals. Limekiln Methodist closed and became a private home in 1930 after amalgamating with Spencerville. The Anglican church was constructed of brick in 1881 and called St. James’ Anglican Church. This church remained active for over a century. The church owned the schoolhouse for many years after its closure using it as a parish hall. In the 1990s a new parish hall was built.

Crystal Rock never had a formal cemetery, however upon the Europeans’ arrival two First Nations burial sites were discovered in the area. Oral histories suggest there may be at least two unmarked family cemeteries from the 1800s. According to local lore, corroborated by a dated newspaper article, one cemetery contains the graves of two girls and a local man's leg which was lost in a dynamite accident.

In the early 1900s, Crystal Rock sustained all its early businesses and trades apart from the limekilns. The last lime was produced here in 1904 and sold to Canada Starch Company (CASCO) in Cardinal. The community became Crystal Rock in 1907 when a post office opened. Postal authorities advised the community to rename itself to avoid confusion with an older settlement of Limekiln, Ontario. Residents submitted names at local meetings where the name Crystal Rock was chosen. By the 1930s all the original businesses and trades operating here had closed except for the school and one church. The Depression coupled with the obsolescence of pioneer industries ultimately led to the decline.

Crystal Rock was briefly revived during the 1940s when electrical power was brought to the area. Numerous small businesses were established along County Road 44 from the late 1940s into the 1970s. In 1946 a garage and service station was constructed which sold gasoline, coal and other necessities and included a small refreshment stand. After the station closed the building became an antique shop and later a welding shop before being destroyed by arson. In the 1950s, a lumber yard and machine shop were operating. In the early 1960s the machine shop was converted into a joint garage and restaurant and a building was moved from Johnstown for a second restaurant.

In 1975, government expropriation was largely responsible for Crystal Rock's final decline. The Land Bank bought out most of the land causing many to leave. Several buildings were demolished including most of the early pioneer cabins, barns and some stone houses and the lots were left abandoned. Into the 1990s, the church, and a restaurant remained open and a horse track, gunsmith and upholstering business briefly operated. Presently, Crystal Rock consists solely of residential properties and a limestone quarry.

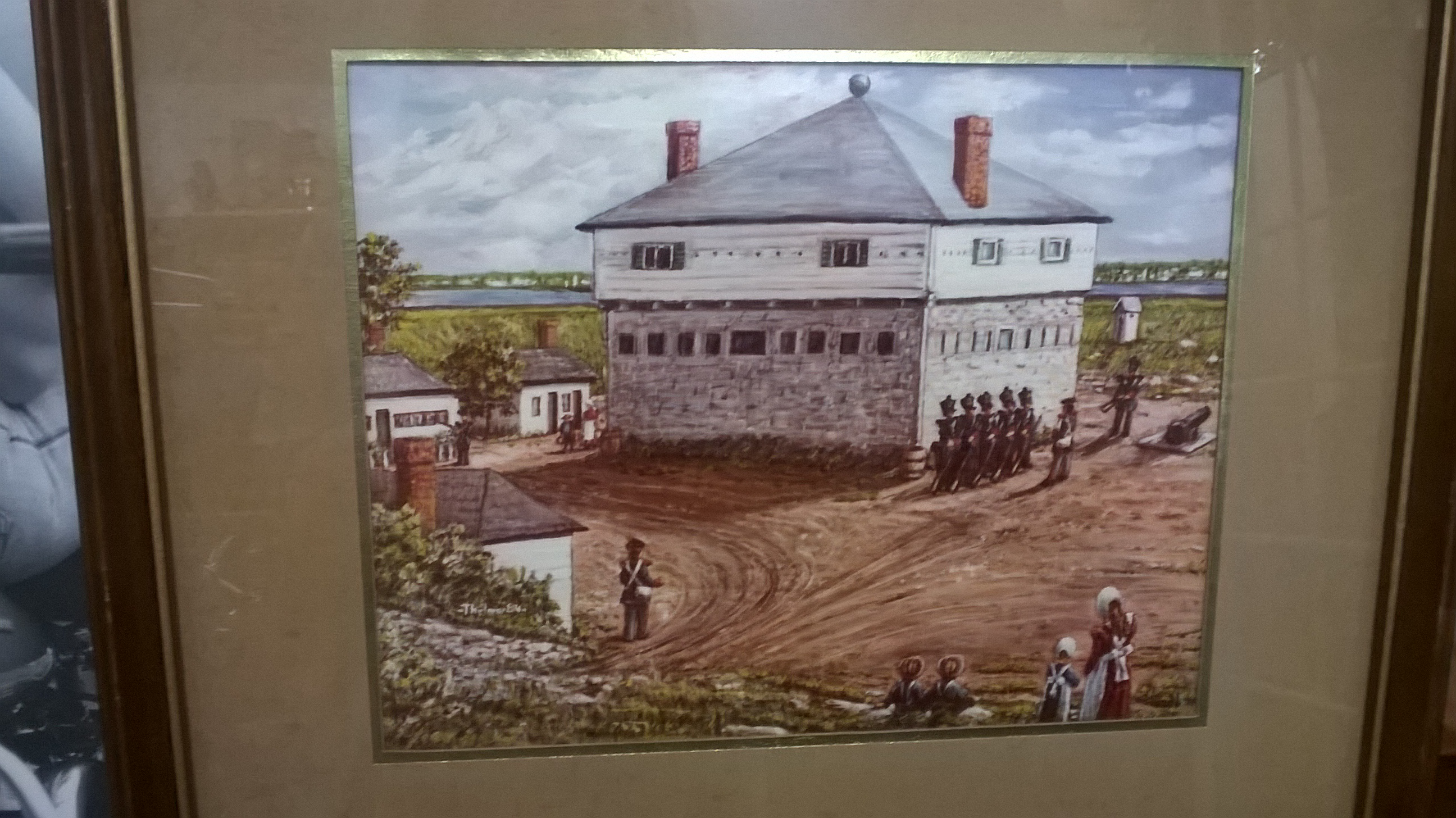
Framed print of Thelma Cameron's painting of Fort Wellington.

==== Thelma Cameron ====
Artist and author Thelma Cameron (October 20, 1918 – December 19, 2009) lived in Crystal Rock for most of her life. In the 1970s she turned her home in Crystal Rock into the Crystal Rock Art Room, which was a gallery for her original works. At the time of her death she had self-published three books including an autobiography and two local histories, one of which was about Crystal Rock. It was published in 1994 and titled Crystal Rock History (Its Rocky Twists and Turns). One of Cameron's paintings was presented to Queen Elizabeth II by the Town of Prescott in the 1980s during her visit to Fort Wellington.

=== Glen Smail ===
Glen Smail, Ontario is a rural community located approximately 2 mi (3.2 km) south of Spencerville along County Road 44 near its intersection with Glen Smail Road. The settlement was first called Cowdrey's Hill followed by Hunter's Settlement before receiving the name Glen Smail; Cowdrey, Hunter and Smail were all surnames of the first prominent settlers in succession. The land was first occupied in 1818 and grew to become a village by mid-century. Glen Smail was at its height in the mid-to-late 1800s when many pioneer industries, farms and businesses were active. Around 1900, the population was around 100.

Settled mainly by Scottish immigrants, Glen Smail began as an agricultural community with most residents supporting themselves through family farms. By the 1850s, some pioneer businesses and trades began to operate from the village. This included a general store which sold food items, alcohol and other necessities and a steam-powered sawmill. The sawmill was notably the only of its kind during the mid-1800s in the township and could operate year-round.

Two schools operated in Glen Smail, a common school as well as a Roman Catholic separate school. The first common school was built in 1837 along County Road 44. The school was a one-room log schoolhouse, and was reportedly in bad condition throughout its operation. The school was called S.S. No. 11 Glen Smail School, as Glen Smail was school section number eleven in the township. In 1864, the structure was replaced by a stone schoolhouse built further south on the opposite side of the road. The school closed in 1964, as one-room schools began to be phased out, and the building was converted into a private residence.

The first Roman Catholic separate school was built around 1861. There are few records for the first separate school and little else is known about it aside from the fact it was located around half a mile south of the common school, and was open for only four years. In 1959, a new separate school was constructed on donated land called St. Mary's School. In 1963, two rooms were added onto the building to accommodate the increasing number of pupils. This school operated until 1979, after which the building was abandoned until 1982 when it was bought by the Edwardsburgh Lions Club to be used for club functions.

By the end of the 1800s, a few more businesses had opened in the village, however Glen Smail still consisted mostly of farms. In the late-1800s, new businesses included a blacksmith, cooperage, butcher, carriage shop, shoemaker and a village post office. A lime kiln was also built, which provided area farmers with a supplemental income. During the 1880s, the sawmill was closed and sold off, being converted into a cheese factory. Local farmers sold their milk to the factory, and packaging was made by the local cooperage. By 1906, the factory was called William Edgar Cheese Factory. The cheese factory closed by the 1920s, and the building was moved to Shanly to become a general store.

The community began to decline during the 20th century as pioneer industries became increasingly obsolete. When Ontario Highway 16 was constructed around 1918, more traffic came through the community. This led to the construction of a small general store and gas pumps, possibly the last businesses to be established in Glen Smail. By the 1950s, small family farms began to be less profitable due to improved infrastructure and few remained operational in the village. In the 1970s, the land was sold off to the Land Bank and many structures were subsequently demolished. As of 2016, the community consists of sparse residential properties with no businesses in operation.

=== Groveton ===
Groveton, Ontario, is a hamlet located north of Spencerville along County Road 44. The hamlet grew around the intersection of County Road 44 and Buckwheat Road which becomes Groveton Road immediately after the intersection. According to local histories, the community was named in the 1850s by a travelling reverend responsible for delivering the community's religious services prior to a church; the reverend is said to have stated plainly to the congregation the meeting was to be called the "Groveton appointment", which they later attributed to their entire settlement.

In the beginning of the 1800s the area was covered in large white pines which were quickly cleared and hauled south to Johnstown, to then be shipped to Quebec City to later become masts for British naval ships. Once the forest was cleared, the area was left with shallow, sandy soil and rocky ridges, creating terrible farm land; the early settlers quickly became dependent on buckwheat which proved to be the most productive crop or sought income in fields unrelated to agriculture. Into the early 1800s, the community began to grow; before 1850, Groveton was home to a school as well as an inn run by a Thomas King; the inn began operation around 1842 with nine rooms for rent, horse stables as well as a tavern.

The first school in Groveton was erected in 1836, prior to the designation of school sections; this school was constructed of logs and located at the community's main intersection. By 1843, a new log structure was erected on the northwest corner of the intersection to replace the first school; the schoolhouse was used after hours for church services and community meetings. Groveton became its own designated school section in the mid-1800s, known as S.S. No. 16, Groveton, its school was titled the same. In 1873, land was purchased to extend the school's grounds and shortly after the log building was destroyed by fire; a new stone schoolhouse was erected through volunteer labour immediately following. The school ceased operations in 1962 when more modern schools were favoured; the building was left abandoned before being purchased and converted into a home.

By the mid-1800s, Groveton was a thriving pioneer community as many residents had established typical pioneer industries or trades; records indicate a blacksmith as well as carpenters, tinsmiths, weavers, shoemakers, masons and tanners were all in operation here by 1850. In 1857, material was purchased for an Orange Lodge hall to be built in the community; prior to the hall's construction, the group had held meetings in other locations for many years.

In 1851, Groveton became home to the railway industry, when the Bytown and Prescott Railway was laid out through the western part of the settlement. Although the railway did not employ local men, it brought in workers from elsewhere who stayed and spent money in the village. When the railway was completed, a small section of lan along the track was sold to become a new railway flag station. A man named James Doyle erected a primitive boarding house along the railway which was dubbed Doyle's Station. The flag station was only active a few years before being closed by railway authorities who deemed the station unprofitable due to its location on a grade; the station resumed operations in the 1900s, briefly, after locals obtained an order from the Railway Commission to reopen.

By the end of the 19th century, the school and pioneer industries operating from Groveton were still thriving. The community was home to a post office and in 1885, local men leased land just northeast of the hamlet near the settlement of Campbell's Corners with the agreement they would establish a cheese factory there immediately. The cheese factory became known as the Groveton Cheese Factory and remained in operation until the 1930s. In 1890, a frame church was constructed at the settlement's main intersection. The church was built to serve the pre-existing Methodist congregation. The church operated until 1917, when it was permanently closed. The building was used a machine shed before being demolished.

A geological survey of Groveton was conducted by a team from Ottawa around 1905, where the highest point of land between the Saint Lawrence and Ottawa Rivers was identified on property owned by a local family. A concrete marker was placed on the location as well as a 70 ft (21 m) tall, wooden work tower. Shortly after the tower was erected, locals began to climb the wooden structure for the view, however after it was left unmaintained for over a decade, it became both an eyesore and a safety hazard. In 1917, a six-year-old boy attempted to climb the structure, prompting locals to quickly demolish the deteriorating tower. The concrete marker still remains on site and is periodically observed by the Geodetic Survey of Canada.

Into the early 1900s, Groveton became home to new businesses as pioneer industries dwindled, growing increasingly unnecessary. Many sugar bushes were in operation and blueberries were farmed from the nearby marshes to generate an income. Around the 1920s, a new inn was constructed in the community called Groveton Inn. The inn was a popular spot for local entertainment such as dances. The inn operated until the mid-century when it was converted into a home. In the 1940s, a sawmill was in operation for a few years before ceasing operations. After the 1950s, the community continued to decline with all businesses eventually ceasing operations, including the school and post office.

Presently, Groveton exists as a small, rural, residential community. The look of settlement has changed greatly since the 1800s and early 1900s; many farm buildings and former businesses have been demolished, relocated, or repurposed. The community contains no businesses, and very little farming operations are established. Groveton has had very little development since the 1960s, apart from the sporadic construction of private residential dwellings.

=== Hyndman (Grant's Mills) ===
Hyndman, Ontario is the name given to a settlement located in the northeast section of the township along Hyndman Road near its intersections with County Roads 22 and 44; the Petite Nation River flows through the community. The community was known by various names, including Grant's Mills and Grantville, before being referred to as Hyndman; the name Grant was given to the area by one of the first settlers, Lewis Grant, who established the first mills here in the early 1800s which a community subsequently grew around.

In the late-1700s, the land encompassing what would become Hyndman was mostly reserved as Crown land. In the 1790s, a few lots of land were divided and granted to Loyalists who sold the land on for a profit; being surrounded by reserved land they didn't view settlement as a possibility. In 1799, two lots of land were sold to a man named Allen Paterson, who petitioned the Court of Quarter Sessions after his purchase to release more Crown land for sale or lease to the Loyalists to encourage settlement on land which had potential. By 1803, the land Paterson had purchased was still registered in his name however a man named Lewis Grant had settled on the land, dammed the river, and established a flour and gristmill and oat kiln; allegedly these were the first mills erected on the Nation River, and the only mills on the river between Montreal and Kingston for a number of years.

In the beginning of the 1800s, new roads were laid out to make the mills at Hyndman more accessible to the township and more Crown land was leased out to Loyalists for homesteads. By the 1820s, many families were starting to construct homes and settle here after years of the land frequently changing hands. Lewis Grant's son, Daniel, had constructed his own mills, including a sawmill, shingle mill, carding mill as well as a woodworking shop which he rented out. Additionally in the 1820s, more land was sold for settlement to accommodate poverty-stricken families immigrating from Britain.

In the mid-1800s, the village was at its height with the mills all remaining in operation as well as two schools and a church. More immigrants arrived from Britain to settle in the community, establishing homes and small farming operations. Of the settlers, those who were not employed by the mills were usually either farmers or railroad employees; no pioneer trades beyond the mills and woodworking shop were reportedly established in Hyndman.

Prior to the division of school sections, Hyndman had its own log schoolhouse constructed in 1842; the log building was used after hours for religious services and as a community hall. When Hyndman was divided into sections, the area became section No. 17 with the school being referred to as S.S. No. 17 Campbell's Mills School; the school was located between Hyndman and the small neighbouring settlement of Campbell's Corners. In 1852, the log structure had greatly deteriorated and was replaced in a new location, west of its former location on Hyndman Road, by newer a frame building. In 1875, the area was divided into two sections, S.S. No. 17 and S.S. #23; the western section remained No. 17 serving Campbell's Corners, while S.S. No. 23 was created near the intersection of Hyndman Road and County Road 22. The S.S. No. 23 school was replaced by a newer building in 1914, and the old frame schoolhouse was dismantled to have its materials recycled. Both schools closed permanently in 1964 due to the construction of larger, modern schools nearby and improved transportation.

In 1863, the Grantville Congregation was formed by the community as a Wesleyan-Methodist congregation. Shortly after its inception, the congregation purchased land from the Grant family for 5 shillings to construct a church. The church serviced the area for a short time, as the small congregation was eventually amalgamated into a larger congregation from the nearby community of Heckston.

In 1877, the death of Daniel Grant led to the mills of the community being sold along with the Grant homestead to a man named Joseph Hyndman; Hyndman became postmaster upon his arrival which spurred the name change. The Hyndman family operated the mills and established a cheese factory on the property in the 1890s. The factory was originally a red frame building however it was replaced by a cinderblock building, which allowed for year-round operation, after a fire damaged the frame structure in 1933. The cheese produced here was sold locally as well as shipped internationally to England. The cheese factory was enlarged in the 1950s, but business declined in the 1960s when stricter regulation were placed upon cheese production, making it too costly to produce.

Into the 20th century, Hyndman remained relatively unchanged before immediately seeing a decline before 1910. For a brief period, a general store operated after Joseph Hyndman's death in 1901 led to new mill owners, who ran a store accompanying the mill until 1906. At this time, the mills which sustained the community were deemed obsolete and ceased operations, with the buildings being demolished completely by 1907. Sports became increasingly popular in the community in the early 1900s, and an outdoor "arena" was erected in Hyndman on a nearby pond; fees were charged for ice time and organized hockey games against neighbouring community teams were held there. By mid-20th century, the community saw a total decline as all businesses, schools and churches had ceased operations.

Into the late 1900s, a few sporadic developments have taken place in Hyndman; a tree-growing nursery was in operation and land was cleared to accommodate a golf course. Presently, Hyndman is a rural residential community consisting mostly of private homes, with few small farms still in operation. Some modern homes have been constructed here in recent years, many of which have been built on top of what were previously old farms. A commemorative sign has been erected at the former site of the mills established by Lewis Grant to indicate their location.

=== Mainsville ===
Mainsville, Ontario, is a rural community situated around the intersection of Brouseville and Wynands roads. Around the time of its settlement the community was referred to as both Main's Corners and Raney's Corners, after two families which had both established homes at near the intersection.

In the early 1800s, the Mainsville area began to be settled by a few families who established homes and farms around what would become the community's main intersection. The settlement expanded slowly into the 1830s and 1840s, at which point the community began to recognize the need for services such as a church and school.

In 1835, a Presbyterian congregation had formed in Mainsville and part of the Spencerville charge and a church was constructed of log shortly after. Services were conducted by a pastor who also gave services at Spencerville and Cardinal. By the 1860s, the primitive log structure serving as the Presbyterian church was in need of upgrades or replacement. In 1865, the Raney family donated a portion of land on the northwest corner of the main intersection to hold a new Presbyterian church, which was to be called St James Presbyterian Church. In the late 1800s, the church separated from Spencerville to join the Cardinal charge; drive sheds were built behind the church for the congregation. The Presbyterian church closed in 1967 as membership declined and the building was converted into a home. Later into the settlement, in 1870, a Methodist church was built on land purchased from the Main family. This church drew large crowds to its early services however few residents became members; by 1878 the congregation consisted of 50 people. The Mainsville Methodist Church was demolished and replaced in 1893, with drive sheds being built to accompany the church. After the church union in 1925, the church became the Mainsville United Church until its closure in 1971. This church also became a private home.

The first school in Mainsville was established early, around 1844. This log schoolhouse, located on land leased by the Main family, was used until 1860 when it was replaced by a more practical stone schoolhouse situated across the road from the old one. Mainsville was designated its own school section, No. 9, with the school's name recorded as S.S. No. 9 Mainsville School. In later years, the school became known simply as the Mainsville Public School. In 1961, the school was closed and pupils were bussed to a newer, larger school in Johnstown. The stone schoolhouse became a private home.

After 1870, the community had begun to be consistently listed as Mainsville in church and school records; the settlement continued to grow and was now home to a blacksmithing shop and brickyard. By the end of the century Mainsville had a population of 75 and in addition to the original businesses, now had two general stores and a harness shop.

By the 1900s, the majority of the land surrounding Mainsville had been cultivated by farmers. At this time, the community added a cheese factory and a grocery store to its business roster. The cheese factory, constructed in 1906, was supplied by local farmers and operated by the Division Mainsville Cheese Association, a group of local men. The factory burned down in 1946, at which time the owner purchased the cheese factory from Pittston and moved it to Mainsville as a replacement. The factory ceased operations in the 1950s and was converted into apartments. During the first half of the 1900s, team sports became popular, highly organized event throughout the township with each community assembling its own teams. Mainsville had a hockey, football and softball team. The community began to change by the mid-1900s; around this time the village received access to electricity, infrastructure improved and technology became more accessible all of which contributed to the community's obsolescence.

Mainsville Cemetery is a non-denominational cemetery which was used as a community burial ground as early as 1895, however the land was not formally purchased for this use until 1901. In 1897 during the construction of Galop Canal, numerous graves were moved from Cardinal and interred this cemetery. In 1949, the fence surrounding the Mainsville Cemetery was painted and maintained by the Mainsville Women's Institute. As of the 1960s, the cemetery is under the care of the township and a board of trustees. In 1985, a new steel fence and gate were built replacing the old one.

Near the end of the 1900s many properties in Mainsville which once belonged to the first settlers were sold to the government Land Bank. After the properties were purchased, the homes and farms were usually demolished or simply left abandoned. Although many century-old structures were lost, several other buildings from the beginning of the settlement remain standing or occupied. Mainsville has no businesses in operation as of 2016, and consists mostly of residential properties and a few small farms. Newer houses have been periodically built within the community since the mid-1900s.

=== New Wexford ===
New Wexford, Ontario is a small hamlet located just east of the town of Prescott, Ontario, between Prescott and Johnstown. The hamlet is located along the Saint Lawrence River banks, and Ontario Highway 2. By the time Prescott became an established town and the War of 1812 had ended, The King's Highway (Ontario Highway 2) had become a rapidly improving, main corridor between Montreal and Kingston. This showed much potential for the people who held the land at the outskirts of Prescott. The Battle of the Windmill, a skirmish with American rebels in 1838, was fought in the hamlet. The battle was named for a windmill built as well as the promontory and converted as a lighthouse in 1873. Eventually, by the 1850s, the railway had advanced through Prescott and the surrounding area, which generated further interest amongst the landowners to form a community.

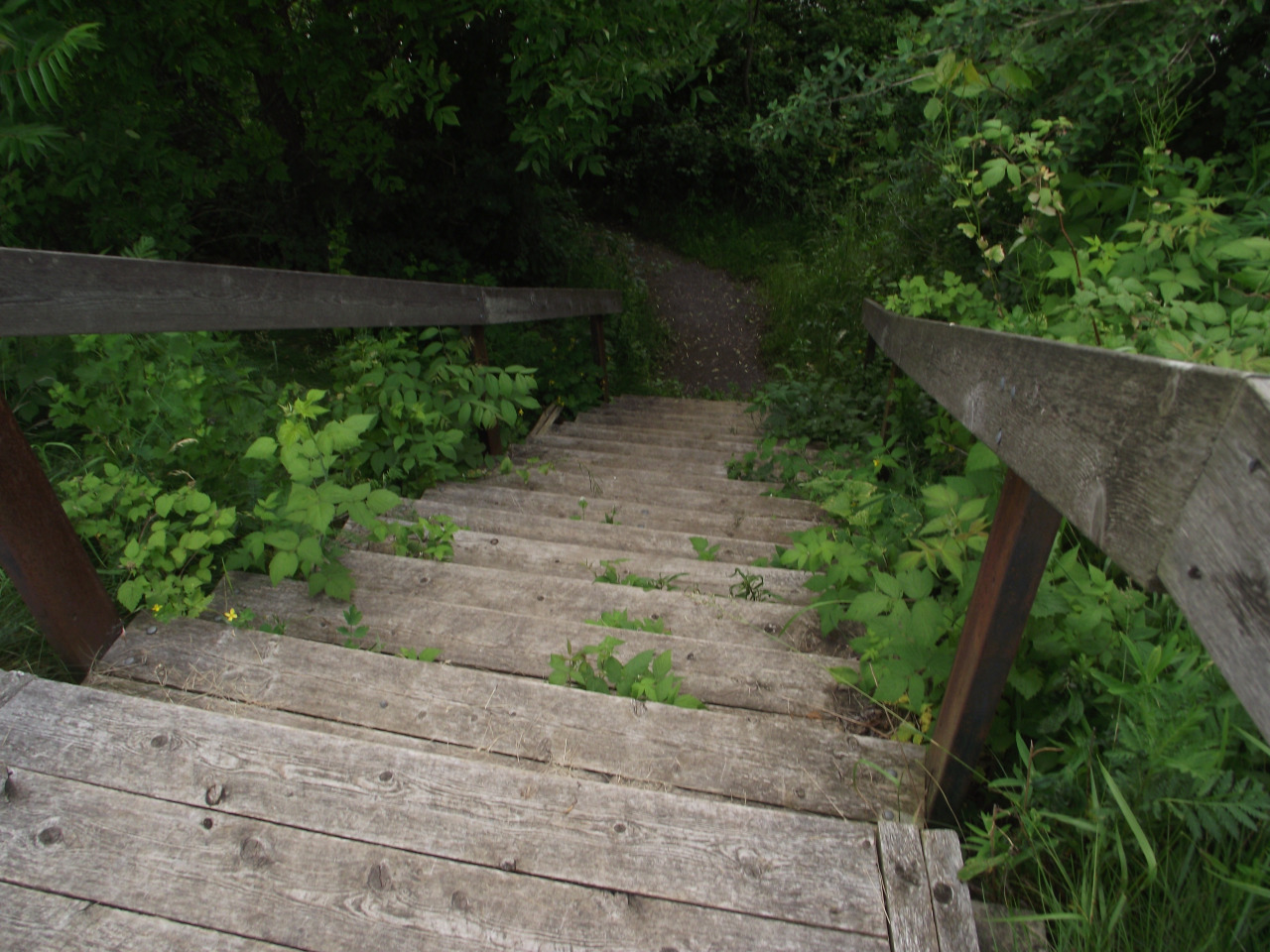
Steps leading down towards the Saint Lawrence River at the Battle of the Windmill historical site in New Wexford, Ontario.

The land in New Wexford was divided and granted to various loyalists in the late 1700s, and changed hands many times until the early 1800s. Around 1835, Dr. Thomas Gainfort, who already owned land in the area, became heir to two more lots of land in close proximity to his existing property. After Gainfort's death in 1854, his three spinster sisters inherited all of his land; it is around this time the railroad and highway were beginning to develop and the settlement began showing growth potential. By 1860, the Gainfort trio had commissioned someone to lay out a town plot on their property to be called New Wexford, as the family is said to have emigrated from Wexford County, Ireland. The most successful early business established in the village was a slaughter house owned by the King family, which remained thriving until the Great Depression. The King's property was located on a piece of land which jutted out into the Saint Lawrence River, leading locals to refer his land as Butcher's Point. The slaughterhouse purchased cattle and swine from local farmers, which was then supplied to local families and to the crews that worked the river barges. Meat was preserved using large ice blocks which were cut from the Saint Lawrence during the winter months.

In the beginning of the 1800s, before formal schooling was introduced to the area, it was recorded that some of the wealthy settlers of New Wexford paid a woman named Ann Drummond, to tutor their children. According to the records, Miss Drummond was paid around 9 shillings for 4 months of private tutoring in 1824. Prior to 1860, little else is known about formal education practices in New Wexford, however it is believed that students would have likely walked into the town of Prescott to attend school. In 1860, seven lots of land were chosen to become New Wexford's first official school, S.S. No. 1. Early records for this school are unclear, the earliest records are from 1899, forty years after the school was established. The first records show that around 20–30 students enrolled in the school, and dates in which the school was closed or postponed and the reasons why; during the year 1899, the school was closed twice – once for rain, and once for the death of a student named Aggie Manion and her father.

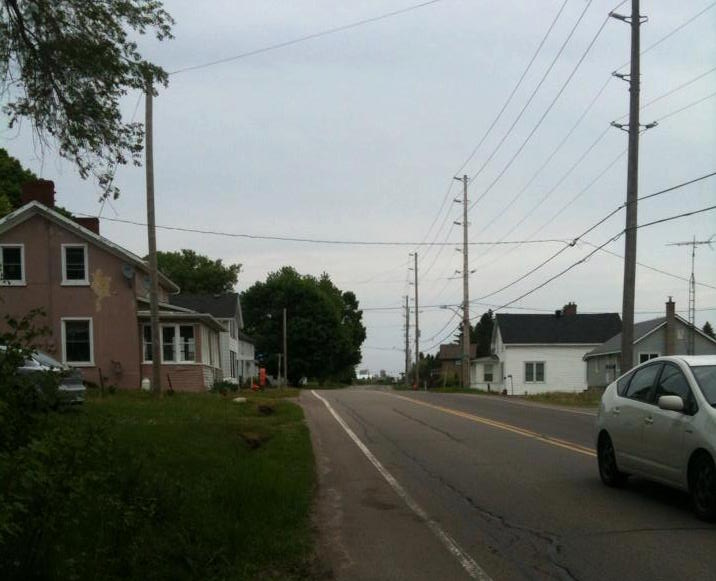
New Wexford as seen along Ontario Highway 2 looking east.

New Wexford's most infamous landmark was formerly an old railway overpass across Ontario Highway 2 with low clearance that frequently caused problems for large transports commuting from Kingston to Montreal, and was the cause of many accidents. Locally, the overpass was referred to as "The Subway", and was built to connect the CPR tracks to Prescott's coal yards, west of the village. Before Highway 401 was built, Ontario Highway 2 was the main corridor between Kingston and Montreal, and despite clear marking of the 10 ft (3.0 m) clearance, many truck drivers sheared off their roofs, or became wedged under the overpass causing traffic congestion. According to local lore, a truck transporting chickens once collided with The Subway and the chickens were subsequently freed, resulting in a village-wide round-up of the escaped birds. The Subway was dismantled in March 1973.

=== Pittston ===
Pittston, Ontario is located on the banks of the South Branch of the South Nation River; north of Cardinal, Ontario, between Brouseville and Shanly. Its main intersection is the crossing of Shanly Road and Pittston Road. Originally, the community was called Riddell's Settlement, as the Riddell family headed six households and owned much of the land here. The community was eventually renamed after William Pitt, who was the first postmaster and built the first general store here in the 1800s. Although much of the land of Pittston was surveyed and distributed as land grants by 1799, the land changed hands many times before being settled by 1840. The village was arguably at its height during the mid-to-late 1800s, at which time several businesses were in operation and family farms were thriving. By the late 1800s, the village had a population of around 150.

The village of Pittston was settled as an agricultural community, with most of its residents running family farms as their main source of income. Eventually, by the mid-1800s the community became home to some pioneer trades and businesses. During the mid-1800s, the village was home to a sawmill, a gristmill, two general stores, and a blacksmith shop. By 1871, a post office was running out of one of the general stores.

When the township was divided by school sections, Pittston was section number ten with its school being accordingly named S.S. No. 10 Pittston School. The first school building in Pittston was constructed around 1841. This schoolhouse was built from log and reportedly "lacked the bare necessities". During the 1850s, a new stone school was built to replace the log structure. In 1908, the stone schoolhouse was condemned and dismantled. A replacement was constructed on Pittston Road, west of the intersection of Shanly Road, at a cost of $5000. The third school was constructed of red brick with a belfry. The new school was divided into multiple rooms and had a basement for storage. The school closed in 1964 when one-room common schools were phased out, and was converted into a home.

The community of Pittston has historically been home to two churches, a Wesleyan-Methodist (now United) church and a Holiness movement church. It is unclear when the Holiness Movement church was constructed, however it was a small frame building located east of the village's main intersection. This church was closed and dismantled in the 1950s, and the salvaged materials were used to construct a new church in Cardinal. The Pittston United Church was constructed in 1870 as a Wesleyan-Methodist church. The land was purchased for one dollar in 1869, with the red brick building being constructed the following year. Around the 1920s, the church became the Pittston United Church after a church union.

A cheese factory was built in Pittston in the late-1800s. By 1885, an addition was added to the cheese factory which housed a grain crusher and planing machine, diversifying operations. The cheese factory burned down twice, once in the late-1800s and once in 1900, and was rebuilt after both fires. By 1900, the factory had reached its peak, producing 20 cheeses a day. The cheese was transported to Spencerville where it was then shipped to Montreal to be exported internationally. The factory closed in the 1940s.

Into the 1900s, many of the businesses in Pittston began to close as improving infrastructure led to the obsolescence of small farming communities. Additionally, many family farms began to cease operations as they were increasing unprofitable. By the mid-1900s, all businesses apart from the general store, which operated until the late 1990s, had closed. In 1950, one new business had opened, another general store, which operated until 1968. In 1971, a Kampgrounds of America (KOA) campground was established in the village. The campground, located east of the main intersection, has space for 90 trailers and 100 tents. The campground has a pool, miniature golf course, ball diamond, playground and hiking trails for recreation.

As of 2016, the KOA campground is the only business in operation in Pittston. The village currently consists mainly of residential properties with a few farms still in operation. The Pittston United Church is still in use.

=== The Island ===
The Island, Ontario, is the name given to a small community located along Dukelow Road, west of Spencerville. In the 19th century, Dukelow Road was only a primitive trail through forest which flooded from both ends during the spring essentially creating a temporary island; this lead locals to refer to the area and surrounding settlement as simply The Island. The Island has been a consistently small settlement, as by the mid-19th century only four families had established homesteads and mixed-farming operations there; the settlement likely obtained its distinction due to its isolation from surrounding communities and not its prosperity.

During the 19th century The Island consisted mostly of farmers; mixed-farming operations were the main source of income and little to no businesses were recorded in the community apart from a sawmill. Residents would likely have relied on travelling to neighbouring communities for services. The sawmill was located on what was the Eighth Concession and was powered by steam engine; the mill operated year-round employing around four men. After the forest was cleared the mill ceased operations and by the 1920s the property used as a homestead and the forest regrown. Mail was delivered to the community by horse and buggy beginning in 1916 until around 1935 when it was then delivered by car until the 1940s; the community never had a formal post office and mail was delivered house by house.

In 1863, the township council designated The Island as its own school section, called S.S. #26; the section was designated much later than others in the area due to low potential enrolment. A log schoolhouse was constructed first, and used until 1901 when it was replaced by a more practical stone structure. The school served elementary aged students. The schoolhouse was used as a meeting place for a variety of social gatherings after hours; most locally notable was the Union Literary Club which operated from the schoolhouse from 1909. The club was exclusive to residents of the Island; a password was required for entry into meetings and members were expected to pay a fee twice a year to maintain membership. The club frequently had musical entertainment, public speakers and formal debates. The school was closed around 1928, when students began to be transported to schools in nearby Spencerville. After the school was closed, the building was later sold and converted into a private home.

During the early 1900s, The Island was a popular gathering spot for the township to participate in organized sports; each village or settlement typically had their own formal hockey team or ball team assembled, depending on the season, which competed against other communities at the few designated hockey "arenas" or parks. A recurring patch of flat ice in a field at The Island was designated the "Island Arena", hockey games and tournaments were organized and held at this outdoor "arena" throughout the winter months. These tournaments were considered important in the township and were large community events; the results of the games were often reported in local newspapers and were well-followed by surrounding communities.

Present day, The Island, although recognized by contemporary maps, consists solely of a few family homes; almost all of the farms have ceased operations and there are no businesses currently located within the community. Development remains minimal; the roads here have been modernized and are mostly paved and well-maintained. Some newer, modern homes have been constructed sporadically within the area in recent years.

=== Ventnor (Adams) ===
Ventnor, Ontario, is a small hamlet located along the Petite Nation River near the village of Spencerville. Originally, the settlement was called Adams after Gideon and Joel Adams, the sons of the Loyalist Dr. Samuel Adams, who received considerable land grants there prior to 1795 which included the rights to establish a mill and dam on the Petite Nation. The Adams family were the first to settle at Ventnor in the early 1800s, and had a mill in operation by 1828. The community of Ventnor was at its height in the late 1800s, a time when many pioneer businesses and industries were active within the village.

Early into the 19th century, the settlement began to grow around the Adams’ mill as more settlers, mostly Loyalists and Scottish or Irish immigrants, established homesteads on the surrounding land. At this point, the settlement was home to a gristmill and a sawmill, later accompanied by an oat kiln and stone flour mill. By the 1840s, the sons of Gideon and Joel Adams inherited the land of what was to be the village of Ventnor; the settlement had by this time a blacksmith, a carriage shop, a general store and a hotel. During the 1850s, land was surveyed and divided into lots, and plans and maps were created detailing the further development of the village of Adams. In 1864, the village established its own post office, which ultimately led to its name change; Adams was deemed unacceptable by postal authorities as another village named Adams existed within Ontario. Ventnor was allegedly randomly chosen from a list of suggested untaken names given by Canada Post, and the village was immediately renamed Ventnor.

The first cemetery located in Ventnor was established around 1837 as a family burial plot for the Stitt family, and is known as Stitt Cemetery; before the community cemetery was established, some early settlers who were not a part of the Stitt family were buried here for lack of a better location. Stitt Cemetery was used as a meeting spot by the village's temperance association. The community cemetery, known as Adams Cemetery, is located along Adams Road south of the community. The land for the cemetery was purchased in the mid-1800s from a member of the Adams family to be a non-denominational burial place. The earliest known burial is dated to 1869. The cemetery is currently maintained by a local board.

By the mid-to-late 19th century, Ventnor had established more businesses and industries alongside the pre-existing ones, including two more general stores, a cabinet maker, milliner, tailor and a carpet manufacturer. Additionally, three doctors were practicing within the village in the mid-1800s. By the 20th century, the community continued to prosper, with the addition of a fourth general store, a second gristmill, a cement works and brickyard, a cheese and butter factory, a barber shop, three churches, a Good Templar's Hall (a temperance association), a public school as well as an ice cream parlour which was supplied by its own cow. By 1899, the community had a population of around 200 individuals, and a second schoolhouse was needed in the village. Sports were a popular community past time during the 1800s, and Ventnor, like most other area communities had its own hockey and baseball teams which competed throughout the township against other the communities; games and tournaments were considered important events and were widely reported on by local newspapers.

Ventnor was at one point home to three churches: a Presbyterian church, a Methodist Episcopal church, and a Wesleyan-Methodist church. The Presbyterian church, known as Ventnor Presbyterian Church, was constructed in 1877 by volunteers using local limestone; upon its construction, it briefly served the Wesleyan-Methodist congregation. The Presbyterian church closed briefly due to the church union in 1925, after which the congregation was to attend the newly formed Ventnor United Church. Dissatisfied with the union, the Presbyterian congregation bought the church back, renaming it Knox Presbyterian; services were held there until the late 1990s. The Wesleyan-Methodist church was built in 1879 on the south side of the Petite Nation and the Episcopal Methodist Church, constructed in the same year, was built along Ventnor Road. The congregation of the Episcopal Methodist church was small, and by the 1880s had amalgamated with the Wesleyan-Methodist church. This congregation assembled at the Wesleyan-Methodist church, and the Episcopal church was sold to the school board. The Wesleyan-Methodist church became known as Canada Methodist Church, until 1925 when it became the Ventnor United Church. The United Church became a community meeting spot after a hall was built alongside it in 1929. By the 1970s, the congregation had greatly decreased and the church was closed except for the occasional wedding ceremony; in 1993, the church was demolished.

The first school in Ventnor was established as early as 1848, as census records from this year indicate a schoolhouse was operating on a local farm however little else is known about this school. In 1852, the first school was replaced by a stone schoolhouse built on Ventnor Road. The school section serving Ventnor was known as section #14, with its school being known as S.S. #14 Ventnor School. Attendance was low as only a third of the enrolled students regularly attended in the mid-1800s. In 1884, the stone schoolhouse was in such bad repair it was condemned and the school board purchased the brick building formerly used as the Episcopal Methodist church to be used as the new school; the spire was removed and replaced with the belfry from the dilapidated stone schoolhouse. In 1898, enrolment and attendance increased and a second school section was opened to serve the village known as section #27, with the school being named S.S. #27 Dobbie's School. The school, located at the corner of County Road 22 and Ventnor Road, was a primitive schoolhouse, originally without running water. In the 1930s, Dobbie's School was upgraded to include basic plumbing and equipment for home economics class. Both S.S. #14 and S.S. #27 operated until the 1960s, at which time students were transported to more modern schools in Shanly or Spencerville.

Into the 20th century, improvements of local roads, the accessibility of motor-vehicles, and the importation of goods ultimately led to the village's decline, as pioneer industries on which the village thrived became obsolete. By 1913, the lumbering business had declined, leading to the closure of the mills, followed by their demolition. The gristmill remained open for a short period of time during the 20th century, during which time it was converted into a cheese factory and later into a boiler plant until it was damaged by fire in the mid-1900s then demolished. The post office was closed in the 1960s, at which time the population had reportedly declined to around 68 individuals; the last business to close was the general store which ceased operations around 1960.

By the late 1900s, Ventnor had become a rural farming and residential community, with few businesses outside of agriculture in operation. Currently, the village is home to some dairy farming operations; however, the village mostly consists of family homes. Despite the lack of businesses, new homes are being constructed in the Ventnor area sporadically, with no formal development plans.

=== Former communities and villages ===
Newport, Rooney's Corners, The Front, The Second, Garryowen, Clover Hill, Spencerville West, Domville Station, Kelly's Settlement and Prescott Junction (also called Junctionville) were communities that were once located within the Edwardsburgh/Cardinal boundaries but are either no longer labelled on maps, or have no remaining structures. Most were barely established communities containing mostly family farms and a few businesses.

==== Clover Hill ====
Clover Hill, Ontario, was a community located north-west of Cardinal. The community got its name from the large hill surrounded by a large field of clover which the settlement was built around. In 1797, the newly surveyed land was first granted to prominent Loyalist men including Gideon Adams and Captain Hugh Munro, both of whom later established other communities in the township. Most of the Loyalists who were granted the land at Clover Hill sold their lots promptly to willing settlers.

In the early 1800s families slowly began to settle the area, sustaining themselves through mixed farming or working as labourers. By mid-century, much of the land of Clover Hill had been cultivated and sugar bushes became a popular addition to local farms. Prior to 1851, a cheese factory called Spotswood Cheese Factory was established in Clover Hill which produced cheese from the milk supplied by the communities farms; this factory remained in operation into the 1900s. Few pioneer trades were established during the mid-1800s, a shoemaker was the only tradesperson recorded on early censuses.

Prior to the division of school sections around 1840, Clover Hill had its own elementary school; the school was constructed primitively of logs and was frequently closed for lack of attendance. In 1853, a school inspector noted that this school had been closed for quite sometime, having possibly been abandoned. By 1862, a schoolhouse was mapped out on Lot 18 of Clover Hill; as records from the time are unclear, it is unknown if this school was the same log school mentioned in 1853 or its replacement. In 1876, the community had enough students to be designated as its own school section, known as S.S. No. 7. A more practical stone schoolhouse was constructed on Lot 18 to replace the old school, which was now titled S.S.#7 Clover Hill School. The school operated until 1939 when it closed for lack of enrolment.

The Clover Hill schoolhouse was located on top of the community's landmark hill which was also the settlement's geographic centre, making the building a convenient meeting place after school hours. The structure was used for a variety of purposes, essentially becoming the community hall, housing concerts, box socials and dances. In addition, residents relied on sports for entertainment, mainly hockey, baseball or lacrosse. Clover Hill assembled its own sports teams which competed against teams from neighbouring communities; these sporting events were widely reported on by local media. Clover Hill was also home to a primitive horse-racing track, constructed by locals with wheelbarrow and shovel.

In the 1900s, a fully mechanized sawmill was established in Clover Hill by a man named Garnett Baker. The mill produced or milled lumber for locals and was contracted to supply Canadian National Railways (CNR) with railway ties. As transportation improved, this sawmill became relatively obsolete as lumber was easily accessible elsewhere. Despite the steady decline in business, the sawmill there remained in operation for many decades, with Baker being its sole owner and operator. The mill closed in 1985 following a fire that destroyed Baker's home. A barn which accompanied the sawmill still stands, having recently been used as the headquarters for the Johnstown Snowmobile Club.

In the mid-1900s, the construction of the Ontario Highway 401, in conjunction with government expropriation, ultimately led to the community's dissolution. The highway was constructed over parts of the settlement, and its construction severed the community's access to the front of the township. In the 1970s, the Edwardsburgh Land Bank purchased much of what remained of Clover Hill. In 1974, residents of Clover Hill were offered $500 an acre for their land from an alleged "secret buyer"; many accepted the offers until the community grew suspicious, and after prying into the matter uncovered the Land Bank scheme. These properties were now owned by the government and essentially left abandoned. Most of the structures that once made up the settlement were demolished, including the schoolhouse, sawmill and numerous farms and houses. Only a handful of the original stone houses built there still remain, one of which is the former home of two of the first settlers, William and Margaret Bush, who are buried in front of the house.

==== Domville Station ====
Domville Station was the name given to a small community which was located north of New Wexford and Prescott Junction, at the western border of the township. The community got its name due to its proximity to the village of Domville and the fact there was a small train station built here in the 1850s. Despite having no established businesses, residents living here felt the need to distinguish their community as the low, swampy land made the rest of the township inaccessible by road for many months of the year. Residents relied on neighbouring communities for their services.

Domville Station was an agricultural community, as most residents in the 1800s sustained themselves through family farming operations. Until World War I, hops were the main commodity as they could be easily sold to nearby breweries.

Around 1844, Domville Station became its own school section, section number eighteen in the township. A log schoolhouse was then built along Glen Smail Road to serve as the community's school. During the mid-1800s, around 50 pupils attended the school on average. In 1874, the land holding the log schoolhouse was purchased with a half-acre being sold back to the school board. The following year a stone school was constructed to replace the log structure. The stone school was referred to as S.S. No. 18 Knowles School, after the Knowles family who owned the land nearby. In the early 1900s, attendance decreased so greatly the school was frequently closed and reopened; upon its 1946 reopening, only 8 pupils were enrolled. Despite decreasing enrolment, the playground was enlarged in 1950 through a land donation. The school closed years later in 1963 when one-room schools were phased out.

The Domville train station, constructed in 1854, was located along the Bytown and Prescott Railway line at its intersection with Hands Road. The station was a red clapboard building, measuring around 10 by 20 ft (3.0 by 6.1 m). It was considered a flag station, as it did not have a station master. Instead, a cylinder outside of the building contained a flag which one would use to flag down a passing train. Inside the station were two long benches and a cooking stove.

As infrastructure improved into the 1900s, family farms became less profitable and ceased operations. The Bytown and Prescott Railway began to shut down in 1966, eliminating the flag stop. During the 1970s, much of the land in the community was purchased by the Land Bank, and many homes were subsequently demolished or left abandoned. The name Domville Station fell into disuse after the community largely dissolved. As of 2016, the land which was once Domville Station consists of a few private homes and a pyrotechnics company, called Hands Fireworks Inc., located on what was once a farm.

==== Garryowen ====
Garryowen, Ontario was a small rural hamlet located south of the village of Ventnor, its central location being the intersection of Armstrong Road and Rock Street. The area was primarily settled in the 1820s by Irish and Scottish immigrants who named the community after the Garryowen air.

During the mid-1800s, Garryowen was a thriving farming community. Wheat, potatoes, pork, as well as maple sugar and syrup were the main farm products. Several farms also raised sheep or had orchards. Many residents opened quarries as the land here was shallow and limestone was abundant. The stone was a profitable resource used locally or sold to construction projects. Other mid-century businesses included a cooperage, shoemaker, weaver and stonemason.

In 1843, a primitive log schoolhouse was built serving elementary aged students. Garryowen was designated school section 12 in the township and the school was accordingly named S.S. No. 12 Garryowen School. The log school was condemned and replaced on site in 1879. The new school was constructed of stone taken from the local quarries. After hours, the school was used as a community hall. The school closed in the 1960s due to lack of enrolment and was converted to a home.

In the late 1800s, Garryowen became home to an outdoor arena. An area was cleared in the centre of a grove referred to as Roddick's Grove. In summer it was set up for baseball and was flooded by a well in winter for hockey. Teams from Garryowen played against those from neighbouring communities and townships. Sporting events were highly organized and tournament results were published by local media.

By the 1890s a vineyard and cheese factory were established in Garryowen. The cheese factory was built in 1892 as the Garryowen Cheese Factory. The factory produced around 300 lb (140 kg) of cheese per day from local milk, which was exported to American and British markets. In 1901, the shareholders formed the Canada Pride Cheese Company. By 1930, cheese was mostly purchased by wholesalers and by the 1940s the factory was closed. The frame factory was dismantled and its lumber used to build three houses.

The population of Garryowen steadily declined from 1900 onward. The land became barren by the 1930s and most farming operations ceased. With few families remaining in the area, the community dissolved and the name Garryowen fell into disuse. Most contemporary maps do not distinguish the area as a locality. In recent years, the area has been somewhat reoccupied by new families.

==== Kelly's Settlement ====
Kelly's Settlement was the name given to a small community located between Crystal Rock and Johnstown along County Road 44, then known as Johnstown Road. The settlement began in the early-to-mid 1800s when several farms and homes were constructed in the area. The residents were mostly farmers in charge of mixed farming operations. Wheat, rye and hops were the main commodities.

During the 1850s, the community became home to a large frame hotel called Kelly's Inn. The inn was owned and operated by James Kelly for whom the settlement was named after. In addition to the inn and farms, the community established some small pioneer trades. A shoemaker, a carpenter and joiner, and two weavers maintained businesses here. The community relied on neighbouring communities for most of its services.

The most recently recorded reference of Kelly's Settlement is from 1864 township records. The record is of a business transaction in which the township hired a local man to construct a bridge at "Kelly’s Settlement on the Johnstown road". After this time, there is no mention of Kelly's Settlement as its own community, and the area was considered part of Crystal Rock. Presently, the area consists of a handful of residential properties and little evidence of the settlement exists.

==== Newport ====
Newport was a planned town located between Johnstown and New Wexford which never ended up becoming fully established. According to some records, the town was also sometimes referred to as New Jerusalem. The proposed village was to be where the current of the Battle of the Windmill National Historic Site is located, often referred to as Windmill Point. The Crown originally granted the land to two Loyalists, John Dulmage and Thomas McIlmoyle, who sold the land to a farmer named Joseph Bass in 1809. Bass held onto the land for five years before selling it off to Solomn Snyder in 1814. Snyder divided 27 and a half acres of his water front property into town lots, declaring this was to become a new town called Newport, Ontario. At the time, the King's Highway (Ontario Highway 2) would have run parallel to the shoreline past the windmill. At its peak, Newport had around ten stone buildings or structures including the windmill, all of which would've been located on what is now Windmill Road. These structures included a stone, one-room schoolhouse, which was called S.S No. 3 North Channel School, a three-story stone building which contained both a tavern and general store, as well as a storehouse and two-storey carriage barn. The remainder of the structures here were family homes.

In 1838, the village was attacked by a group of American invaders from Ogdensburg attempting to "free" Prescott of perceived British oppression; known as the Battle of the Windmill. Although the Americans were ultimately defeated, the town of Newport experienced great loss. During the battle, two civilian lives were lost; a mother and her two children had been hiding in their cellar after their home was seized, with the intention of fleeing at dusk. When the trio exited the cellar, they were immediately spotted by the invading Americans who held their fire, however when they arrived close to the Canadian lines, shots were fired. All three were hit; the mother and her four-year-old son died on the battlefield, while the seventeen-year-old daughter, despite being shot through her jaw, managed to crawl to safety. After the battle, the bodies of fifty American men were buried in a mass grave near the battle site. Most of the buildings that once stood as Newport were burned or destroyed by both cannon and gun fire during the battle, and were not rebuilt.

In 1873, the windmill was converted into a lighthouse, and the village of Newport began to fade into obscurity. The village was never registered and little mention was ever made of it even existing, apart from a popular lighthouse keeper using the name "Newport" to occasionally specify the location of his lighthouse in the late 1800s. In 1920, the area became a designated National Historic Site and is currently owned and maintained by Parks Canada. The ruins of one of the original stone farm houses remained at the site until the 1980s, when it was completely demolished. Present day, only the windmill and one of the original homes that made up the town of Newport remain standing. The home is known as Joseph Bass house, and is one of the oldest homes still standing in the township; it also served as a tavern and general store. According to a Prescott Journal article from 1898, the house was used during battle as a place to keep the injured and dead. Damage from cannon blasts can still be seen on the exterior of the house, which is currently a private residence.

==== Prescott Junction (Junctionville) ====
Prescott Junction was a planned town located east of Prescott, about a kilometre north of New Wexford. The town had triangular boundaries, which at the time were the Grand Trunk Railway line, the Bytown and Prescott Railway line as well as Reynolds Street, a now non-existent road. In 1868, the land was surveyed and divided into 17 lots to become a new townsite. The town was originally called Junctionville, however this name was only used briefly; by 1871 newspapers and business directories were referring to the village as Prescott Junction.

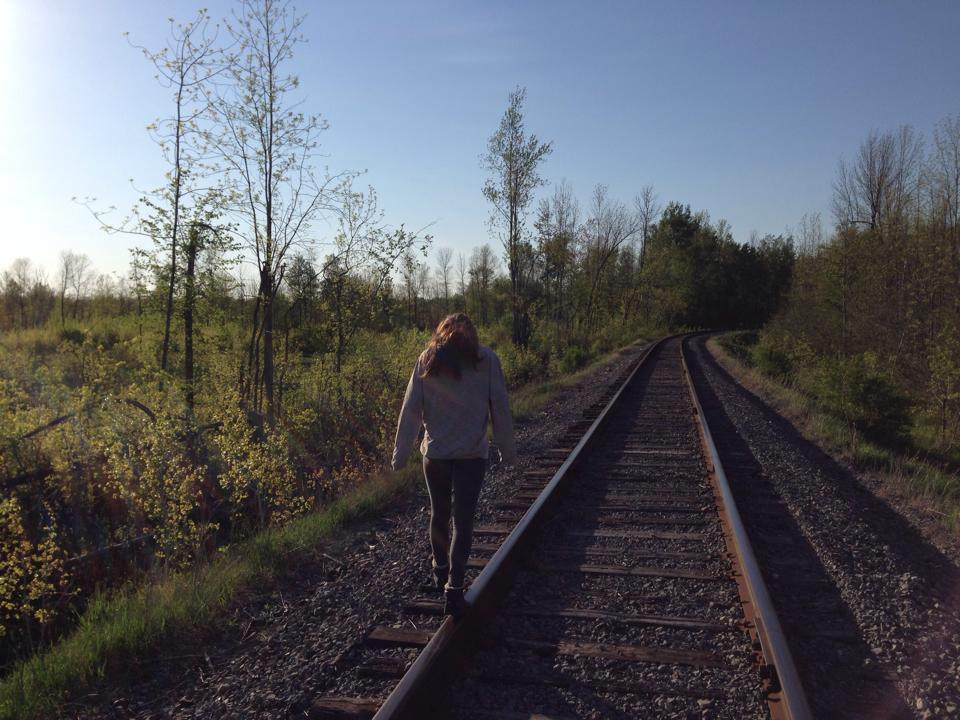
The abandoned CPR rail tracks and scenery near the former site of Prescott Junction (Junctionville), Ontario

By the 1870s the town was thriving, with many businesses and homes having been constructed. Businesses in operation included two hotel and taverns called Beaufort's Inn and the Ottawa Hotel, a Montreal Telegraph Company office, a Grand Trunk Railway station and a Canadian Express Company office. There were enough houses to accommodate around 50 individuals.

In 1884, the Grand Trunk Railway closed its station at Prescott Junction, and eventually the Canadian Pacific Railway took control of the area's railways. The town then became used as coal storage yards and ultimately dissolved.

By the late-1900s, there was little evidence of Prescott Junction's existence. All of the structures were burned or demolished, with only some foundations remaining. Much of the area where the village once stood is now entirely overgrown, while some land has been incorporated into the Prescott Golf Course.

The most noticeable piece of architecture left over from the town was a wooden footbridge which crossed over the former Bytown and Prescott Railway line, referred to by locals as Hangman's Bridge. The ominous name led some to associate the bridge with actual hangings, however there is no evidence of any hangings associated with the bridge ever occurring. It is likely that the bridge got its name from the fact its simple wood construction vaguely resembled a gallows. The bridge was demolished around the late 1980s or early 1990s.

==== Rooney's Corners ====
Rooney's Corners was the name given to a small community near Cedar Grove Road and Rooney Road; what was the communities centre is now the junction of the 401, Ontario Highway 16, and the aforementioned roads. Highway development dissected most of the land and the remainder was sold off to the government Land Bank around the 1970s. The community's name was taken from the surname of the owners of the general store, Edward and Rosanna Rooney.

During the 1800s, Rooney's Corners was a thriving farming community with some pioneer industries in operation. The settlement had a limestone quarry and clay deposits which were both mined and a pottery business known as Mooney's Pottery was established. As most of the residents here sought an income through farming, a cheese factory was subsequently built relying on the local milk supply. The frame factory was known as Rooney's Cheese Factory.

In 1848, a schoolhouse was located on a farm along Cedar Grove Road. When school sections were designated, the school was originally a union section with the neighbouring township of Augusta. By 1852, Rooney's Corners and the surrounding area had a large enough population to warrant their own school section. The area was labelled as section No. 20 with its school being accordingly named S.S. No. 20 Cedar Grove School. The school required yearly grants to stay open, and was eventually replaced in 1900 by a frame schoolhouse built further west.

In addition to the common school, in 1855 plans were made to erect a Roman Catholic Separate School in the community. By 1856, a stone schoolhouse was constructed along Cedar Grove Road and designated Separate School #1; it is believed to have been the first separate school in the township. The first teacher was paid 36 pounds a year plus board to teach elementary-aged students basic school subjects such as spelling or grammar. In later years the school closed periodically due to lack of enrolment before being permanently closed around 1907.

By 1871, a sawmill was established by the Chapman family on a small creek situated off of Cedar Grove Road. The mill, called Chapman's mill, also operated as a carding mill for a period of time, supplying the community with slab lumber and shingles. In later years the mill was converted to operate on steam power. In the early 1900s, Wentworth Chapman was crippled in an accident at the mill involving escaped horses. Shortly after this, the mill ceased operations and later was destroyed by fire along with the Chapman family's farm. Until the 1990s, the chimney once belonging to Chapman's mill, which survived the fire, remained in its original location; it was a 75 ft (23 m) tall stone structure with a 6 ft^{2} (0.56 m^{2}) base.

In the early 1900s, Rooney's Corners was essentially at a standstill. The schools and mill had closed, however around this time the general store, which lent the settlement its name, was established on County Road 44. The community saw some excitement in the 1920s, during prohibition, when bootlegging became a profitable endeavour; Rooney's Corners was located along a popular smuggling route. A ball diamond was laid out in a nearby cow pasture in the 1920s which held organized ball games against teams from nearby settlements and villages; the results of the games were often published in local newspapers.

During the 1950s, many of the farms and houses which formed Rooney's Corners were expropriated by the Provincial Highway Department to accommodate Highway 401. Within a short time, much of the community was demolished. In the 1970s, much of the remaining land around Rooney's Corners and Cedar Grove Road was purchased by the government Land Bank; houses and lots were either demolished or left abandoned. Around the 1980s, the cluster of houses along Fraser Road, all belonging to members of the Fraser family, became referred to as Fraserville; the designation was spurred due to the extensive Christmas light decorations put up each year by the family, which attracted local attention.

Presently, there is little to no visible trace of the community's existence. Many of the buildings constructed by early settlers along Rooney and Cedar Grove roads have disappeared, including all of the former businesses, schools and many farms and houses. The name Rooney's Corners has more-or-less disappeared, no longer commonly ascribed to the area.

==== The Front ====
The Front was the name given to the community situated between Cardinal and Johnstown on the First Concession of the township, along the Saint Lawrence River. The name was given to the community as this area of land was considered to be at the front of the township, and was often referred to as simply "The Front" by locals. Despite its location along the river, little settlement occurred before the late 1700s, when the Loyalists arrived.

By 1792, much of the land along The Front was granted to disbanded Loyalist soldiers, who had been settling the area and clearing the land sporadically since it was surveyed 1784. The first settlers established small farms here, raising livestock or planting crops. As early as 1790, two gristmills and a sawmill were in operation along The Front, however by 1865, these mills were no longer mentioned in records and presumed closed.

In the early 1800s, residents of The Front relied on the river for a means of employment. Businesses involving river transportation were profitable at this time, such as hauling boats through the Galops Rapids. Later into the century, construction projects such as the building of the Galop Canal provided work for the residents of The Front. In addition to the river, residents sustained themselves through various agricultural means; the area consisted of many farms and orchards which sold dairy, produce or other goods to local markets. Cheese factories dotted the area along The Front giving farmers a place to sell their milk production, and supplying cheese to local communities; The Front was serviced by the cheese factories of Rooney's Corners and Cardinal, as well as its own Perry Creek factory, located on Lot 23 on the First Concession. The Perry Creek factory was destroyed by fire in 1897, but was rebuilt within a month; the new factory operated until 1923.

In 1826, a Presbyterian church was constructed in what is now considered part of Cardinal, however at the time was known as The Front Church. In 1827, the first Anglican church in the township of Edwardsburgh/Cardinal was erected in The Front with an accompanying burial ground; the church operated until 1873, while the cemetery is still in use today. Around 1849, a Wesleyan-Methodist church was erected on Lot 10 of the First Concession, just west of Cardinal; this church operated for a short time, before the congregation amalgamated with the Episcopal Methodist church located in Cardinal to become a United church. Two other churches, more commonly associated with he villages of Johnstown and Cardinal, were considered as belonging to The Front when they were first constructed; the Sacred Heart Roman Catholic Church, now considered to be in Cardinal, was constructed in 1875 and the Johnstown Methodist Church constructed in 1879.

Two schools operated along The Front serving the community's students. According to an 1851 census, a schoolhouse was located west of Cardinal on property belonging to the McIlmoyle family. Little is known about the school, except for that it was purchased in 1853 and closed sometime before the end of the 1800s; it is likely after 1872 the schools in Cardinal began to serve the students from this schoolhouse. During the mid-1800s when school sections were divided, S.S. No. 3 North Channel School served many of the students from The Front. North Channel School opened in 1845, however little records exist regarding the early history of the school. The building was replaced in 1876 by a structure described as primitive and unattractive, having been left unpainted; the building was only around for a few months before being destroyed by arson. A new school was constructed as a replacement shortly after; the new school was described as meticulously kept and remained in operation until the mid-1900s.

In the 1930s, a small coal business operated along Empire-Hannah Road. Coal was stockpiled here and sold locally; the small company was eventually bought out and the remaining coal was sent to Ottawa by train until stocks were depleted and the company folded. In the 1950s, the community saw a boom in prosperity with the construction of the Saint Lawrence Seaway, and Highway 2 became a main commercial and tourist route. As tourists were common and workers from the construction project were seeking temporary accommodations, during this time, numerous tourist cabins or other roadside sleeping accommodations were in operating along The Front. Additionally, three service stations were located between Johnstown and Cardinal, selling fuel and repairing vehicles. A general store was opened to serve the workers as well as the tourists, which closed upon the Seaway's completion.

By the mid-1900s, The Front was decreasingly dependent on agriculture and many large farms were subsequently divided into smaller lots for constructing family homes; many homes have been constructed along Highway 2 sporadically since this time. Presently, the community which was once referred to as The Front consists of a strip of mainly residential properties stretching for many kilometres from Johnstown to Cardinal along the highway. Many old homes, barns and former businesses built by the early settlers during the late 18th and early 19th centuries are still standing and occupied, however there are also many which have been demolished or replaced. The Front is a designation rarely used today to describe the area, having fallen into disuse some time ago.

==== The Second ====
The Second was the name given to a small settlement located along what was the Second Concession of the township, now Froom and Scott roads. The concession line, instead of lying straight, ran parallel to the Saint Lawrence River shoreline leading to a break in the road and oddly shaped lots; the Second Concession was thus known locally as the "Broken Second".

In the late 1700s, the land at The Second had been surveyed and divided into lots to be distributed as land grants to Loyalists or to be purchased by European immigrants; by 1792 some land here was occupied. Around 1795, a Loyalist named Thomas Gooseberry, one of only three black Loyalists from Jessup's Corps, was granted a lot of land here; Gooseberry did not settle here, as by 1801 his name was absent from census records.

In the early 1800s, settlement at The Second increased as more families established homes and began clearing the land. The Second remained a small agricultural until the mid-1800s, consisting of farms and homes with no prominent businesses. By 1851, the community had significant growth in population but not in industry; agriculture was the most cited means of employment next to jobs on the river, such as ship captains. Only one pioneer tradesperson was operating a business during this time as a shoemaker. The farmers of The Second mostly established mixed-farming operations; field crops such as wheat, oats, hay, peas and potatoes were popular and common livestock included dairy cattle, swine, sheep and horses. Beekeeping and apple orchards were also common on local farms.

In 1843, a school was constructed of logs along The Second. Little is known about this school; the log structure was replaced by a stone schoolhouse not long after its construction. When school sections were divided The Second was designated S.S. No. 5. The stone schoolhouse reportedly provided primitive accommodations, as it lacked a proper heating source and running water. The schoolhouse operated into the early 1900s when it too was replaced by a slightly more modern building. In 1949, a local named Andrew Wylie willed part of his land along the Second Concession for the construction of a new school. A brick school, called Wylie's School, was constructed in 1950 consisting of a single room and modern conveniences such as washrooms and electricity. Wylie's School closed in 1969.

In 1855, the Grand Trunk Railway was established nearby in Cardinal which allowed the community farmers to conveniently distribute their goods to larger markets in cities like Montreal. Around the same time a cheese factory, supplied by local milk, was established and operated well into the 1900s. Although farming was still the main industry, women began to be self-employed as weavers or seamstresses during the mid-19th century. No new businesses were established in The Second through to 1900; the community relied heavily on the village of Cardinal for services as well as travelling salesmen.

In the early 1900s, the community remained relatively unchanged from the previous century until the 1950s when the community began to feel a slow decline. Improved infrastructure lessened the communities dependency on agriculture and self-sustainability. At the end of the 1950s, the construction of Highway 401 disrupted the community; almost all of the farms along The Second had their northern sections severed off to accommodate the highway. Presently, The Second consists of mainly residential addresses and has no businesses currently in operation. Locally, the road and surrounding area is still often referred to as the "Broken Second" despite the community's steady decline.

==== Spencerville West ====
Spencerville West was the name given to the community located slightly north-west of Spencerville; the community extended west from the abandoned CPR tracks (one mile west of Spencerville) to the township border and encompassed the western ends of Dukelow and Goodin road. The designation of the community Spencerville West was first used by Spencerville United Church groups to more accurately define its congregation. The land in the area was settled by the mid–19th century, as the South Nation River branches off through the centre of the community, making ideal farm land.

By the late nineteenth century, the community consisted of many mixed-farming operations and a few businesses. A cheese factory was constructed around this time, which operated for a period of time as a joint business of the Ventnor factory ran by Millar and Ferguson. This cheese factory was in operation from 1874 until 1948 when it was closed and dismantled. Additionally, there was two orchards in operation, a cooperage, many small sugar bushes and an icehouse which sold cut ice blocks to farmers. The most notable sugar bush was that of the Drummond family, whose vast farm land was locally designated as Drummond's Hill during the 19th century. The Drummond family were prominent community figures who settled here before 1803; their sugar bush has sold maple sugar and syrup from the same property since around 1817. On the north side of County Road 21 along Keeler's Creek was a sawmill first operated by the Keeler family. The water-powered mill operated until the early 1920s when it was left abandoned, falling later into ruins.

Early into the settlement of the community, a church was erected by Methodists on property belonging to and donated by the Drummond family. This church was served by the same ministers as the Spencerville churches, and some in its congregation were from the neighbouring township of Augusta. In addition to the church, a Sunday school was built around 1815 next to the church called Union Sunday School or Union Sabbath School. The Sunday school was of brick construction and served the area Protestants. In 1876, the church was rebuilt out of brick as well; at this time, the church was known as Drummond's Methodist Church. Most of the building supplies for the church were donated, and labour was supplied by local volunteers. The church and school closed in the early 1900s and were later demolished with financial difficulties being cited as the reason. Today, a stone monument reading "Drummond’s Union Sabbath School, 1815–1913" stands on the site of the former church and school.

When school sections were introduced in the mid-19th century, Spencerville West became a union school section with Augusta township, as the village of Roebuck in located on the other side of the township border. In Edwardsburgh this section was known as S.S. No. 19 (S.S. No. 25 in Augusta), with its schoolhouse being named accordingly, S.S. No. 19 Edwardsburgh/Roebuck School. It is unclear when the first S.S. No. 19 was built, however the first structure was replaced by a new one in 1870. The school served on average around 100 pupils from ages five to twenty years. Later, in 1896, an additional room was added and in 1960, washrooms were added. In the mid-1960s the school closed as transportation to larger, modern schools became available.

In the early 1900s, a sawmill was built on the south side of County Road 21 in the community by the McGuire family who operated this sawmill into the late 1900s. In the 1930s, a small general store was open for a brief period to serve the community of Spencerville West which sold dry goods and groceries as well as animal feed. The store was destroyed by fire in 1941 then rebuilt a year later. The store was later converted into a private dwelling before being demolished sometime in the mid-1900s to widen the road.

Presently, Spencerville West consists mainly of farms and residential properties and it is not a listed community on most contemporary maps. The Drummond family still reside here operating their sugar bush and a small restaurant; maple syrup and sugar is sold and patrons are served dishes which can typically be served with maple syrup such as pancakes.

== Demographics ==
In the 2021 Census of Population conducted by Statistics Canada, Edwardsburgh/Cardinal had a population of 7,505 living in 3,138 of its 3,285 total private dwellings, a change of 6.1% from its 2016 population of 7,074. With a land area of 309.91 km^{2} (119.66 sq mi), it had a population density of 24.2/km^{2} (62.7/sq mi) in 2021.

According to 2016 census data, individuals aged 65 or older accounted for 20% of the population of Edwardsburgh/Cardinal; working aged individuals (those aged 15–64) accounted for 65.2% of the population. 14.7% of the total population were classified as children, and were ages 0 through 14 years.

Canada census – Edwardsburgh/Cardinal community profile

	2021	2016	2011
Population	7,505 (+6.1% from 2016)	7,093 (1.9% from 2011)	6,959 (4.0% from 2006)
Land area	309.91 km^{2} (119.66 sq mi)	311.25 km^{2} (120.17 sq mi)	312.34 km^{2} (120.60 sq mi)
Population density	24.2/km^{2} (63/sq mi)	22.8/km^{2} (59/sq mi)	22.3/km^{2} (58/sq mi)
Median age	48.4 (M: 47.6, F: 48.8)	46.7 (M: 46.3, F: 47.1)
Private dwellings	3,285 (total) 3,138 (occupied)	2,918 (total)	2,986 (total)
Median household income	$84,000

References: 2021 2016 2011

Historical census populations – Edwardsburgh/Cardinal
Year	Pop.	±%
2001	6,674	—
2006	6,689	+0.2%
2011	6,959	+4.0%
2016	7,093	+1.9%
2021	7,505	+5.8%
Source: Statistics Canada

=== Immigration, diversity and language ===
National Household Survey data from 2011 indicates that 4.1% of the population of Edwardsburgh/Cardinal were foreign-born immigrants, while 95.8% were Canadian-born non-immigrants; there were no non-permanent residents identified in the township. None of the immigrants identified were considered to be recent immigrants, meaning they immigrated here prior to 2006. The most common countries of origin reported were the United Kingdom and the United States, with the United Kingdom accounting for 29.8% of the immigrant population, and the United States accounting for 19.3%.

According to the 2011 NHS data, 1% of the township's population were considered to be visible minorities; an estimated 70 individuals. The largest visible minority group in Edwardsburgh/Cardinal was Black. In contrast, the percentage of visible minorities living in Ontario was 25.9% of the population, with the largest minority group being of South Asian or Chinese descent. The three most frequently reported ethnic origins of the township's population were either solely, or a combination of Canadian, English, and/or Irish.

In 2011 in Edwardsburgh/Cardinal, 92.0% of the population spoke only English as a mother tongue; 4.5% of the population reported French, and 2.9% a non-official language, as a mother tongue. 97.6% of the population reportedly spoke mostly English while at home. The most common non-official language mother-tongue was Dutch, which accounted for 27.9% of the non-official language speaking population. In comparison, the most commonly reported non-official mother-tongue in Ontario was reportedly Italian.

Percentages of non-official languages spoken as a mother-tongue in Edwardsburgh/Cardinal.
Mother Tongue	Number of Individuals	% Amongst Non-official Language population	Percentage Amongst Total Population
Dutch	60	27.9%	0.9%
German	55	25.6%	0.8%
Polish	15	7.0%	0.2%
Greek	10	4.7%	0.1%
Punjabi	10	4.7%	0.1%

=== Religious demographics ===
Upon the Loyalists first arrival in 1784, there was already two missionaries belonging to the Roman Catholic church in what would later be Upper Canada. Shortly after settlement, the British appointed chaplains to attend to the needs of both Anglican and Presbyterian Loyalists. Later on, Methodism was introduced to the area by ancestral German Protestants. These four religious denominations maintained strong influence in Edwardsburgh/Cardinal into the modern age.

Religious Affiliation	Count	Percentage
Roman Catholic	1,755	25.3%
United church	1,525	22.0%
Anglican	1,050	15.2%
No religious affiliation	1,285	18.5%

In 2011, 81.5% of the population of Edwardsburgh/Cardinal associated themselves with a religion, according to National Household Survey data. The most common religion stated was Roman Catholic.

=== Labour ===
In 2011, 3,385 individuals of working age reported being employed while 370 individuals reported being unemployed. This means the employment rate was at 57.8% and the unemployment rate was around 9.9%.

Labour force status	Individuals
Total number of working age	5,860
In the labour force	3,750
Not in the labour force	2,105
Employed	3,385
Unemployed	370

Within the township of Edwardsburgh/Cardinal, the top three industries of employment were manufacturing, retail trade and construction. The top occupations were middle management positions in trade, transportation, production and utilities; transportation jobs and heavy equipment operation or repair, and sales representatives or salespersons. In the township, the percentage of workers aged 15 – 24 was 11.2% of the work force and the percentage of individuals aged 55–64 in the workforce was 15.5%. The majority of the work force is aged 35 – 54 years, accounting for 51.8% of Edwardsburgh/Cardinal's working age population.

The average commute for residents of Edwardsburgh/Cardinal is around 28.7 minutes which is close to the national average of 27.6 minutes. In the year 2011, only 0.3% of those living in the township used some form of public transportation to get to or from work; the national average being around 14%. 88.4% of the population used a car, truck or van as a driver while 5.9% reported being a passenger. 81.4% of working individuals reported working at their usual establishment while 6.9% worked from home and 11.2 have no fixed work address.

Class of worker	Number	Percentage
Total employed work force	3,385	100.0
Employee	3,005	88.8
Self-employed	380	11.2
Self-employed (incorporated or unincorporated)	345	10.2
Unpaid family worker	30	0.9

== Cemeteries ==
Edwardsburgh/Cardinal is home to many small cemeteries and private family burial plots, most of which are over a century old. It is believed there are potentially many small family plots from the late 18th, and early 19th centuries that remain unknown within the township, as mortality rates in this time were much higher and early settlers needed to bury their dead quickly and easily; most people at this time were buried on the family property.

Grave robbing was also an issue faced by early settlers, as fresh bodies could be sold for profit to those looking to practice medicine; burying the bodies of loved ones close to the homestead decreased the likelihood of anyone being tempted to steal the body. No grave markers were likely placed on these graves; any markers that would have been used in these times would likely have not survived two centuries.

The oldest legible stone in the area can be found at North Channel Cemetery. The grave and stone belong to Jerusha Plumley, who was buried here in 1801. One of the earliest known burials in the area took place in the same cemetery a few years prior, in 1796. The grave is that of John McIlmoyle Sr., and though the dates were recorded the stone marker is no longer there.

The following is a list of all the registered cemeteries, including private cemeteries, in Edwardsburgh/Cardinal:

- Johnstown Cemetery
- North Channel Cemetery
- Adams Cemetery
- Mainsville Cemetery
- Shanly Cemetery
- Driver Cemetery
- Bush cemetery
- Connell Cemetery
- Holmes Cemetery
- St. Andrew's Cemetery
- St. Lawrence O’Toole Cemetery
- Spencerville Union Cemetery
- Cardinal Presbyterian Cemetery
- Cardinal Methodist Cemetery
- Sacred Heart Cemetery
- St. Paul's Cemetery

=== Private cemeteries ===
There are around six private cemeteries located in the township on record; these cemeteries are from the mid-to-late 19th century and are small family plots that were erected on former homesteads. These small cemeteries are located on private property and therefore not accessible to the public.

Along what was formerly The Front, the family of John Driver (d.1896) are buried along with Henry Bolton (d.1856), who was once a fairly prominent local figure; the burying place is known as Driver Cemetery. On the outskirts of Spencerville near Connell Road, there are two old family cemeteries in close proximity; one is a family plot for the Connell family, and the other the Stitt family. The stones in these family plots date from as far back as 1837. The Holmes Cemetery located near Pittston is a fairly large family plot, with over ten members of the Holmes family interred here. Many of the Holmes family stones are too decayed to read however the earliest confirmed interment was in 1849, and the most recent in 1910.

The Kane Cemetery was located in Groveton on property originally owned by Isaac Wilson, and was the burying place of three of his relatives; including his mother, and two of his adult children who died as a result of a fever epidemic in 1850. In 1880, the grandson of Isaac Wilson built a small fence around the cemetery however the stone markers were later moved to Adams cemetery in Ventnor where they remain today. Near Clover Hill, a pioneer man named William Bush and his wife are buried on what was once their homestead.

=== Vaults ===
The township is also home to a few cemetery vaults, four of which still stand. Also known as dead houses, these stone vaults were used to store bodies in cold-climate areas until the ground could be excavated for burial.

The Shanly cemetery vault is located in close proximity to the hamlet's cemetery. This vault is in poor condition but still stands; it is estimated to have been built around 1876, the same time the Shanly cemetery was erected. There are two vaults located in Spencerville, the Spencerville Funeral Home vault and the Connell vault. The Connell vault is located just outside the village, on the Connell family's property. It was built in 1912 as a private family vault and remains a private structure today. The Spencerville Funeral Home vault is located on County Road 44 just south of the village. The vault was built in 1892, and according to The Prescott Journal in an article published August 24, 1893, the vault was built at a cost of $600 and had every modern convenience of the time in regards to vaults. As of 2008, the vault was owned by the Grant Brown Funeral Home of Spencerville and was still in use. St. Paul's Cemetery vault is located within St. Paul's Cemetery on the outskirts of Cardinal. It is believed this vault was built using stones salvaged from the St. Paul's Anglican church when it was dismantled in 1872. This vault was still in use as of 2008.

== Education ==
=== History ===
In the late 1700s, most of the Loyalists upon their arrival to the area were farmers, and did not see formal education as a valuable or important thing. In 1787, three years after their arrival, more privileged Loyalists began to petition for a school to be built in each district, to teach mathematics, arithmetic, English and Latin. Finally, in the early 1800s, the government of Upper Canada passed The Common School Act of 1816, which allowed for a common school to be built in every district where at least 20 students would attend. It would then be the township's responsibility to divide itself into School Sections based upon the locations of the congregated pupils. The Act distributed grants of £25 to schools that met the requirements to pay for a teacher's salary. Although this Act showed promise for the township, the Act did not supply funds for building materials or labour for schools to be built, thus few schools managed to be established early on.

In the 1840s, further school related Acts were passed that led to vast improvement of the Common School education system in Edwardsburgh/Cardinal. By 1845, the superintendent for the Edwardsburgh district recorded 20 schools operating in the area with 755 children registered as students. In the 1850s, the township began to consider building separate schools in lieu of Common Schools, however these schools more expensive for the township to open due to a higher taxation on separate schools. When another Act went into effect in the mid-1850s, the common and separate schools levelled in price, as the double taxation on separate schools ended. This led to the first separate school being erected in 1855.

In total, about 28 single-room separate schools were registered in the township of Edwardsburgh/Cardinal. The separate schools were phased out after bigger, newer schools were built in the larger villages and pupils started being transported there instead. Many of the structures are still standing and have been converted into private homes. The following is a list of some of these schools and their names:

- S.S No. 1, New Wexford
- S.S No. 3, North Channel
- S.S No. 4, Cardinal
- S.S No. 5, The Second
- S.S No. 6, Brouseville
- S.S No. 7, Clover Hill
- S.S No. 8, Crystal Rock
- S.S No. 9, Mainsville
- S.S No. 10, Pittston
- S.S No. 11, Glen Smail
- S.S No. 12, Garryowen
- S.S No. 13, Shanly
- S.S No. 14, Ventnor
- S.S No. 15, Spencerville
- S.S No. 16, Groveton
- S.S No. 17, Campbell's Corners
- S.S No. 18, Knowles school
- S.S No. 20, Cedar Grove
- S.S No. 23, Hyndman
- S.S No. 25, Edwardsburgh
- S.S No. 26, The Island
- S.S No. 27, Dobbie's school

=== Present day ===
Currently, the township's schools belong to the Upper Canada District School Board. There are only two schools still operating within the township boundaries: South-Edwardsburgh Public School in Johnstown, and Centennial '67 Public School in Spencerville. Both of these schools are elementary schools; for high school, students have the option of either South Grenville District High School in Prescott, or North Grenville District High School in Kemptville, both of which are located in close proximity to the township. For Catholic schools, students from Edwardsburgh/Cardinal may attend St. Mark Catholic School in Prescott or St. Mary-St. Cecilia Catholic School in Morrisburg; as these are the closest elementary schools to the township under the Catholic District School Board of Eastern Ontario. The closest Catholic high school to the township is St. Michael Catholic High School located in Kemptville. Elementary students also have the option of attending St. Lawrence Academy, located in Prescott, which is a private school that focuses on Christian values. The nearest post-secondary school to the township is the St. Lawrence College campus located in Brockville. For adult schools and continuing education, residents of Edwardsburgh/Cardinal have the option of attending a TR Leger School campus located in Prescott.

In 2011 according to the National Household Survey, of 5,060 adults (persons over 25 years of age) in the township, 53.8% had obtained some form of post-secondary education; 13.8% having a university degree, and an additional 27.4% having a college diploma, and 12.5% having a trades certificate. 27.1% of the township's adult population reported a high school diploma being the highest level of education attainment, and 19.3% reported having neither a high school nor a post-secondary diploma or degree. Within Edwardsburgh/Cardinal, the percentage of seniors (ages 65+) with post-secondary credentials was 42.4% and the percentage of seniors without any credentials was 40.3%. The percentage of adults (ages 25–44) with post-secondary credentials was about 20% higher, at 62.5%; the percentage of adults without post-secondary credentials was significantly lower than the percentage of seniors, with only 10.4% having not attained any certifications.

Most common field of study for the adult population with post-secondary certification in Edwardsburgh/Cardinal
Field of Study	# of Individuals	% of Population
Business, management, or marketing	480	17.6%
Health professions/related programs	340	12.5%
Construction trades	295	10.8%
Mechanic and repair technologies	230	8.5%
Engineering technologies or related fields	155	5.7%

The most common field of study in Edwardsburgh/Cardinal is business, management or marketing. In the year 2011, of the 2,720 residents aged 25 or older who had obtained a post-secondary education, 86.2% had attended school in Ontario, 9.6% had studied in another province or territory and 4.2% had studied outside Canada.

== Notable people ==
- Gideon Adams (1755–1834), political figure
- Leo Boivin (born 1932), NHL player
- Rusty Crawford (1885–1971), NHL player
- Todd Gill (born 1965), NHL player
- Peter Hoy (born 1966), Major League Baseball player
- George Perry Graham (1859–1943), political figure

== See also ==
- List of townships in Ontario
- Ogdensburg–Prescott International Bridge
- Royal eponyms in Canada
