= Shanly, Ontario =

Shanly
- Compact Rural Community
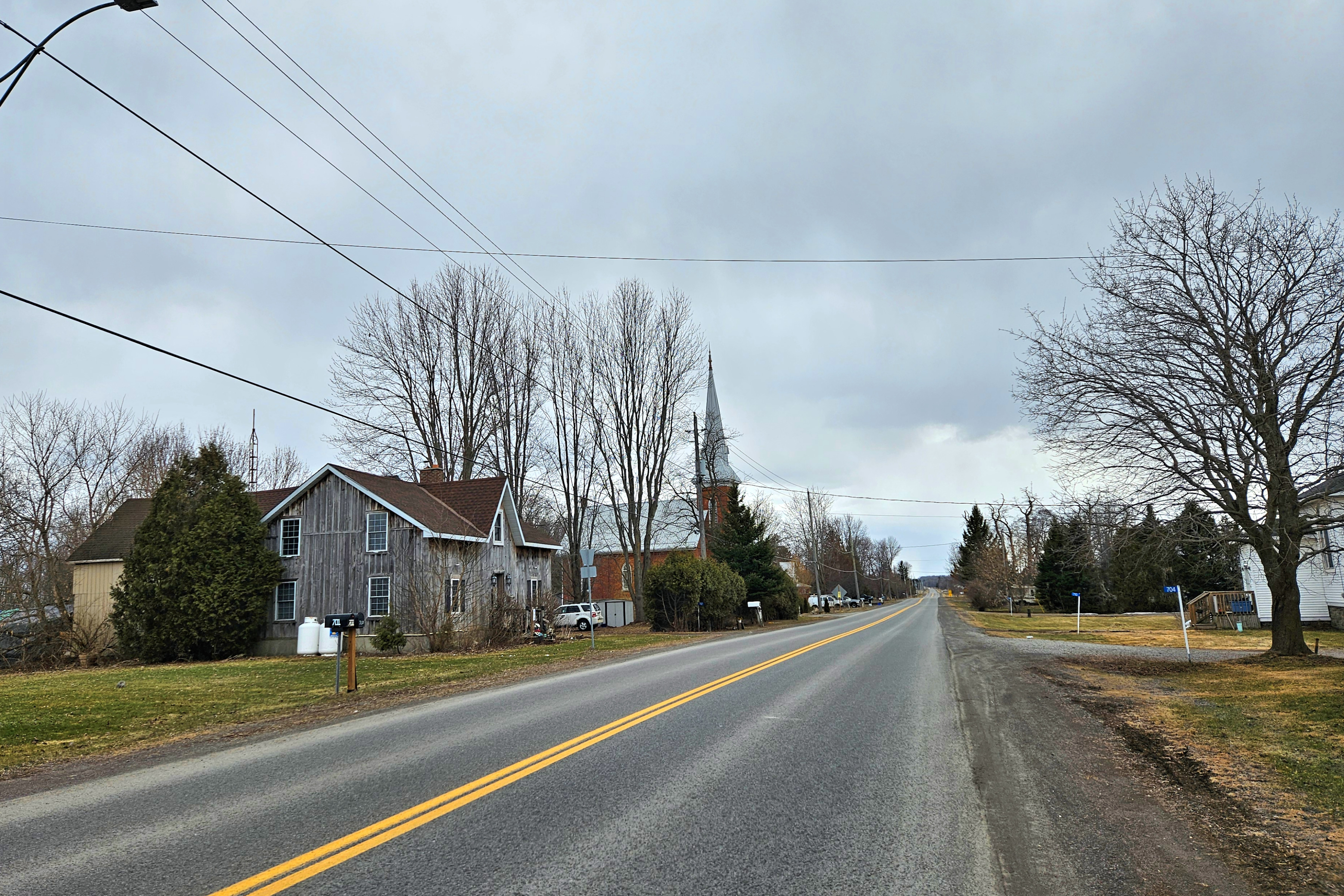
- Etymology: Named for Walter Shanly
- Location in southern Ontario
- Coordinates: 44°53′26″N 75°28′14″W
- Country: Canada
- Province: Ontario
- County: Leeds and Grenville
- Municipality: Edwardsburgh/Cardinal
- Elevation: 87 m (285 ft)
- Time zone: UTC-5 (Eastern Time Zone)
  - Summer (DST): UTC-4 (Eastern Time Zone)
- Postal Code: K0E 1X0
- Area codes: 613, 343

Shanly is an unincorporated place and Compact Rural Community in the township of Edwardsburgh/Cardinal in the United Counties of Leeds and Grenville in eastern Ontario, Canada. The village is about one hour south of Ottawa and around 7 miles north-west of Cardinal. Shanly is centred around the intersection of County Road 22, also known as Shanly Road, and County Road 21. Formerly these roads were the Nine Mile Road and the Seventh Concession, respectively. The community was settled during the 1800s, primarily as an agricultural community, and was at its height during the latter half of the 19th century, when many farms and a few businesses and factories were in operation. As of the 2000s, the rural area surrounding the main intersection consists of mostly residential properties and a few family farms. The village is also home to a few businesses and two churches.

In the 1840s, the village that would later become Shanly was called Moore's Settlement, however the meaning of this name is allegedly lost to time. From the 1800s until the 1970s, County Road 22 ran north from Cardinal and ended at the intersection of County Road 21, continuing north again to the west of this junction; early into settlement, the junction was commonly referred to as simply "the Corner" by locals. By the 1860s the community was renamed to Wallace's Corner, Wallace being the surname of a large local family who were one of the first to settle here in 1827. The village was renamed Shanly in 1885 after Walter Shanly, a prominent local political figure who was responsible for establishing the community's post office.

== History ==
The land which currently makes up the village changed hands many times during the beginning of the 19th century before being settled. Some families, including the Wallace family, first established permanent homesteads here during the 1820s. For the first half of the 1800s the community consisted primarily of family farms and homes, and residents sustained themselves almost entirely through agricultural means. By the 1830s, the settlement had grown large enough in population to require its own schoolhouse. Shanly continued to grow in population, and by mid-century had established a post office and a Wesleyan-Methodist church. The post office was established on February 1, 1865, with a man named William Clark as the first postmaster.

In the mid-1800s the Loyal Orange Institution, a Protestant fraternal organization, had a group based in Shanly known collectively as the Loyal Orange Lodge No. 1227. The Orange Lodge constructed a hall in 1869, calling the building Dufferin Lodge. The two-storey frame structure consisted of an upper-level meeting hall and a lower-level drive shed. This hall was replaced in 1889, when new hall was constructed for their meetings in a new location. In 1949, the Orange Lodge tore down the hall after purchasing the Workman's Hall from the Shanly United Church (formerly the Wesleyan-Methodist), which was used for meeting into the 1990s.

By the mid-to-late 1800s, the population of Shanly had reached around 160 individuals. By the 1880s, the village was home to numerous pioneer industries and businesses including a blacksmith, a harness shop, a cooperage, a carpentry and woodworking shop, a tin shop, a hay and grain dealer, and a grocery store which adjoined the post office. Additionally, the village was home to a second church by the late-1800s, which was of Anglican denomination. Most of the residents during the end of the century still sought an income through agriculture, with some residents being listed in business directories as employed as builders.

During the late-1800s, Shanly was home to two cheese factories. The first factory was constructed on the east-side of County Road 22 around forty rods north from the village's main intersection, and was operated by two local men. The cheese from the first factory was shipped to Brockville for sale. It is unclear when exactly the first cheese factory was constructed or closed. The structure was demolished sometime after its closure. The second cheese factory was constructed east of the intersection, and was built around 1890. The second factory was called the Shanly Cheese Factory and operated for over 50 years. According to a statement from 1910, the factory had produced 21,337 pounds of cheese in the month of September. In 1901, the Shanly Cheese Factory received recognition at the Pan-American Exposition in Buffalo, New York for its quality product. The second factory was originally owned by multiple shareholders before being sold off to an individual named Thomas Johnston at an unknown date. Johnston owned the cheese factory until its closure. In August 1952, the Shanly Cheese Factory was destroyed by fire and was not rebuilt.

As with most of the other communities in Edwardsburgh/Cardinal, organized team sports were a crucial part of the community's social scene in the late-1800s and into the early 20th century. Shanly was home to a rugby team during this time, with their own designated and maintained rugby field located on a local family's property. Tournaments or matches were played against teams from neighbouring communities or townships which drew crowds from throughout the area, and were considered significant community events. The results of the matches were widely reported in newspapers from Edwardsburgh/Cardinal and the nearby townships.

At the start of the 1900s Shanly remained a stable community in terms of its population and active businesses, however the post office closed in 1913 and the Anglican church closed in 1921. The last wave of immigration occurred immediately following World War II, when several Dutch families came to the area. By the mid-twentieth century the village began to experience a decline in prosperity. Around this time the pioneer industries, such as the cooperage, harness shop and blacksmith, became obsolete and ceased operation along with the cheese factories. For half a century, from around 1920 until 1972, absolutely no new houses were constructed in Shanly. In 1964, a modern public elementary school was built to amalgamate the schoolhouses of the surrounding area which were being phased out.

The general store, located at the main intersection, remained open until the 1970s. During the later years of its operation, around the 1930s onward, the store was damaged and then repaired several times when cars failing to stop at the intersection drove into the building. In 1973, the general store and former post office were demolished when County Road 22 was rerouted, creating a four-way intersection with County Road 21 at the former junction.

== Education and schools ==
The first common school in the village of Shanly was built in 1836 and was known as Moore's School. This school was a one-room schoolhouse serving elementary aged students. The building was an 18 by 20 foot long log structure. When Shanly was designated a school section it became section number thirteen. In 1865, the log building was replaced by a newer stone schoolhouse, which was called S.S. #13 Wallace's Corners School. The school was replaced a third time in 1900 with a frame structure. The school closed around the 1960s when one-room common schools were phased out in favour of larger, modern public elementary schools.

In 1964 a modern, brick school was built in Shanly called North Edwardsburgh Public School. The rectangular building contained six classrooms as well as a gymnasium. The school was built to accommodate around 134 pupils. Originally operating as an elementary level school, by the 2000s North Edwardsburgh Public School only served primary students, junior and senior kindergarten through to grade three. In 2008, the decision was made by the Upper Canada District School Board to close North Edwardsburgh Public School. Ultimately, closing the school would cut costs and enrolment had declined in numerous public schools in the area, which led to area schools amalgamating. Pupils from North Edwardsburgh were moved to Centennial ’67 Public School in nearby Spencerville. The building which was once North Edwardsburgh Public School still stands, having been converted after its closure into a retirement home.

== Churches and cemetery ==
Shanly is currently home to two churches, the Shanly United Church and the Shanliwood Community Church. Historically, Shanly was home to both an Anglican and Wesleyan-Methodist church, with the Wesleyan-Methodist church later becoming the Shanly United Church.

Prior to 1860, the first log schoolhouse served as a meeting place for the Methodist congregation. The first Wesleyan-Methodist church was a white frame building, measuring 26 by 36 feet, built on land belonging to Walter Shanly. Opening ceremonies for the first Wesleyan-Methodist church occurred on December 30, 1860. By the 1890s, the frame structure had deteriorated and the congregation decided to replace the church at a new location, more central to the village. The new Methodist church was constructed of red brick and stone in 1893 with a 100-foot long shed accompanying it. After a church union, the Wesleyan-Methodist church became the Shanly United Church. In 1993, the church celebrated its centennial. Since 1976, there has been an annual Christmas party held in the village on the Friday before December 25 in the basement of the Shanly United Church.

The Anglican church in Shanly was located on a triangular piece of land, locally referred to as the Flat Iron, east of the village intersection. It is unclear when the church was established, however business directories from the late 1800s mention its existence. The Anglican church closed in 1921 and the land was deeded back to family who owned it previously. It was used as a private dwelling for a period of time before being dismantled. The brick from the Anglican church was used in the 1930s to modernize and repair the village's general store.

Shanly has a graveyard as well, with graves dating nearly 200 years old. The Shanly Cemetery was erected in 1876, on land purchased from the Wallace family for $100 by a trio of village residents. The cemetery was established as a multi-denominational cemetery. The first burial was that of Prudence Pitt, the infant daughter of a local couple. In 1962, the stone gateposts at the entrance of the cemetery were erected in memory of T. Carl Reilly. As of the 1990s, the cemetery was still in use, and is maintained by the Shanly Cemetery Board.

The Shanliwood Community Church is a Baptist church located along County Road 21. The church opened in 1996. The building used to be a small restaurant, but it was bought and converted into a church, by an unknown man who built his house beside it.

== Modern day ==
The current borders of Shanly are indefinite, although historically the western limit of Shanly's school district extended to lot 12 of County Road 21, with lots west of this belonging to Garryowen. Shanly is located in a rural area, and the main area of it is hardly more populous than the surrounding country side. Some believe Shanly is only a road, and the inhabitants of this road make up its population, while others believe Shanly includes the sprawling fields and forests that surround it.

By the mid-1900s all of Shanly's businesses and services from the previous century, aside from the Shanly United Church, had ceased operations. In the 1990s a church was constructed for the area's Baptists. Some years after Shanly's initial decline, a few new businesses were established during the late 1900s which are all reportedly still in operation as of the 2010s. During the 1970s, William Hooper Woodworking Inc. was established as a custom woodworking business. When North Edwardsburgh Public School was closed around 2009, the building became a retirement home called BonLen Place. The building was converted from classrooms into one and two-bedroom apartments. The facility houses retired individuals who are able to live independently, without constant care or supervision.

The agricultural industry of Shanly steadily declined throughout the 1900s as family farm operations became increasingly inactive or unprofitable due to improving infrastructure. As of the 2000s, the community consisted mostly of residential properties and very few farms. Despite this a few farms are still active, some of which have maintained operations for over a century. The most notable farming operation still operating in the village is possibly the Holmestead Farm, a family farm operated by the seventh generation of the Holmes family. The Holmes' moved to Shanly around the 1850s and established the farm on their land shortly after.

As of 2016, Shanly remains home to a maple sugar bush and restaurant called Hunter's Maple Products & Pancake House. The business is owned and operated by the seventh generation of the Hunter family, who immigrated from Scotland to Shanly in 1821. Although the Hunter's have produced maple sugar and syrup from the property since around the time of their settlement, the sugar bush didn't become a fully operational business until the 1970s.

Overall, little development or immigration has occurred in Shanly since the turn of the 20th century apart from the few aforementioned businesses established from 1970 onwards. Some new, modern homes have been constructed in the surrounding area since the 1970s. These homes were built sporadically over a course of decades, during which time other homes were demolished, meaning the village remains sparsely occupied.
