= Johnstown, Ontario =

Johnstown
- Compact rural community
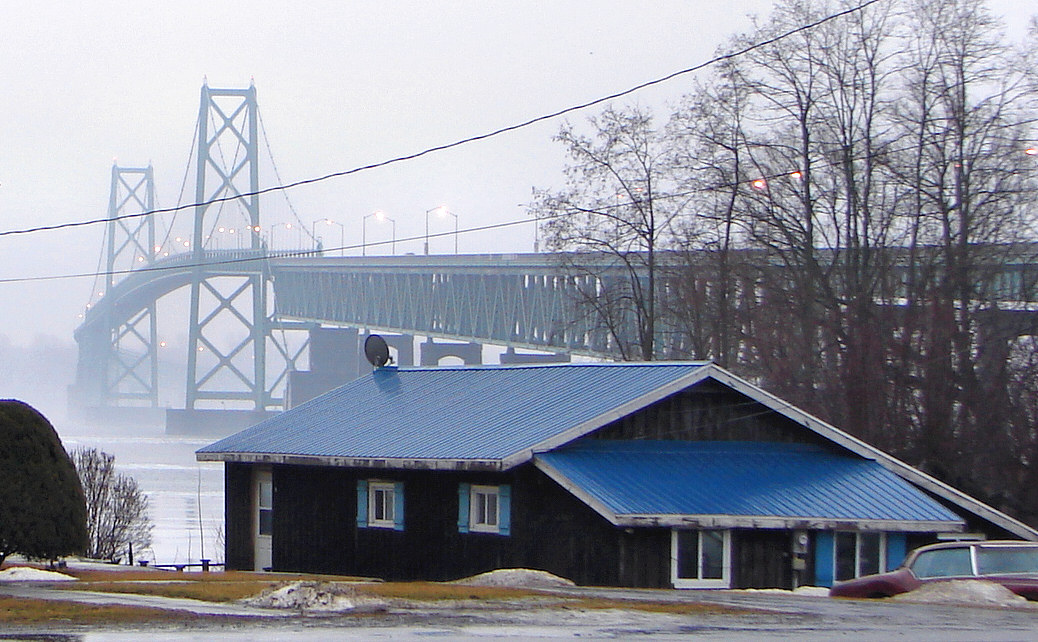
- Johnstown with the Ogdensburg-Prescott International Bridge in the background

- Location in Southern Ontario
- Coordinates: 44°44′53″N 75°28′11″W
- Country: Canada
- Province: Ontario
- County: United Counties of Leeds and Grenville
- Municipality: Edwardsburgh/Cardinal
- First settled: 1673
- Elevation: 84 m (276 ft)
- Time zone: UTC-5 (Eastern Time Zone)
  - Summer (DST): UTC-4 (Eastern Time Zone)
- Postal code: K0E 1T1
- Area codes: 613, 343

Johnstown is a compact rural community in the United Counties of Leeds and Grenville, in eastern Ontario, Canada, part of the township municipality of Edwardsburgh/Cardinal. It is at the Canadian terminus of the Ogdensburg–Prescott International Bridge and at the southern termini of Highway 416 and Highway 16.

== History ==
Prior to the arrival of Europeans, Johnstown and the surrounding area had been sporadically occupied by various Indigenous cultures for many centuries. Evidence of their presence such as clay utensils and arrowheads have been found throughout the township. No physical evidence of significant Native American settlements, such as longhouses, have been discovered within the hamlet itself, however the hamlet was apparently frequented by Natives. According to the Edwardsburgh Centennial Committee, who compiled a history of the township in 1967, Johnstown was used by Native Americans as a stopover place due to its location. Before the construction of dams and later the Saint Lawrence Seaway, Johnstown was fronted by calm section of the St. Lawrence River located between two rapids. This would have made the land of present-day Johnstown a convenient place for those travelling on the river to rest. When the French arrived in the 1600s they were met by the Native Americans at Johnstown, who were essentially responsible for inspiring the French to settle here.

=== French period (1673–1760) ===
The first regular land occupancy began in 1673 when French settlers, along with the allied Natives, built a fortified storehouse in present-day Johnstown, then called La Veille Gallette. The storehouse was situated on the shores of Old Breeches River, now called Johnstown Creek, and was used to hold supplies headed upriver to fur trading posts such as Fort Frontenac (Now, Kingston). It was in use until 1758.

In 1760, the French constructed a fort near Johnstown called Fort de Lévis. The fort was located on Chimney Island (Formerly known as Isle Royale) in the St. Lawrence River just off of the shores of Grenville Park. It was built in preparation for a British attack as an attempt to block their advance down river. The original design, created by and named after Francis de Gaston, Chevalier de Levis, intended for the fort to be built with stone walls, have 200 guns, and house 2,500 troops. Instead, the fort was built much smaller and of wood, with five cannon and about 300 soldiers. In the same year it was built, the fort was captured by the British during the Battle of the Thousand Islands. After a week-long standoff, the 11,000 British troops led by Jeffery Amherst succeeded in taking the fort from the few hundred French. The French troops managed to significantly delay the British arrival to Montreal, and succeeded in sinking two ships as well as crippling a third. The number of British casualties was 26 dead and 47 wounded, while the French saw 275 of their 300 troops killed or wounded. The British renamed the captured fort Fort William Augustus.

=== Settlement: 1760–1808 ===
During and after the American Revolutionary War, those in opposition to American independence were dubbed Loyalists, and ultimately became refugees when their opposition was met with violence. Thousands were displaced who then fled to Canada, relying on the British Crown for a solution. As part of a resolution, townships were surveyed in the 1780s along the St. Lawrence River in present-day Leeds and Grenville, which included the township of Edwardsburgh/Cardinal. By 1784, 166 Loyalists were residing in the township and until 1790 the landing point and base camp for these settlers was at Johnstown. Loyalists intended to turn the base camp into a new townsite.

In 1788, plans for a town site were drawn up with a plot of 1.0 square mile (2.6 km^{2}). The plan was created by the government Land Committee with strict regulations in regards to the layout of houses and streets. By 1789, a number of Loyalist men were placed in charge of selecting the location of the town site, at that time called simply "New Town". The agreed upon site was that of present-day Johnstown. The name Johnstown was selected in 1790 after a pastor suggested they name the town after Sir William Johnson.

In 1792 John Graves Simcoe, the first Lieutenant Governor of Upper Canada, established himself in Johnstown which then became the district’s administrative seat or "capital". This led to the court of quarter sessions (the district's government) alternating its meeting location between Johnstown and Cornwall, and to the construction of a courthouse and gaol. The courthouse was a log structure, which stood near the present site of the Ogdensburg-Prescott International Bridge. By the late 1790s, the village was also home to a sawmill, gristmill, and an inn and tavern. Census records indicate by 1807, there were 36 houses and a general store.

In 1808, the seat of justice was moved to Elizabethtown (now Brockville), as it was a more central location in the district. The move and village's shallow harbour prevented the village from ever reaching its expected potential.

=== 1800s ===
By the mid-1800s, Johnstown was less prosperous than many other Edwardsburgh/Cardinal communities. Most residents made a living through farming, while later into the century some pioneer industries operated in the village. The village relied on nearby Prescott for most services including the post office. The saw and grist mill which had been in operation since the late 1700s was sold during the 1800s and became known as Wharton's Mill for most of its operation. This mill was a gristmill, sawmill and carding mill. In addition to the mills, a pottery business called Mooney's Pottery provided employment opportunities for the village. Mooney’s employed around four men and made earthenware items such as ink wells or pots which were sold throughout the county.

By the last half of the 19th century, some pioneer tradespeople and businesses were active in the community aside from the mill and pottery manufacturer. This included a blacksmithing shop, a tavern called Finnegan's Tavern, the McAuley Motel, several hot houses, as well as a tourist camp called St. Lawrence Resort Camp. By the 1870s, the village had two grocery stores. Some business directories from the late-1800s indicate Johnstown also employed a village constable.

=== Early 1900s ===
Johnstown began to grow as a village again by the 1920s when the grain elevator (now the Port of Johnstown) was constructed and highway traffic along Highway 2 increased. During this time, the village became home to three car garages, boarding houses and a barber shop. The construction of the St. Lawrence Seaway in the late 1950s and the international bridge in 1960 also contributed to an influx of people residing in Johnstown. During the 1960s many new homes and subdivisions were constructed in the village to accommodate the influx. Two new motels were constructed around this time, the Johnstown Motel and the Glen Motel, both of which have since closed.

From the 1960s onward Johnstown has continued to develop, becoming the township's industrial centre. In the late 1900s, the community was home to a variety of businesses such as a cable manufacturer, a machine and welding shop, an automotive repair shop, a Chrysler dealership, and a few others. Many of these twentieth century businesses have since changed or closed.

== Modern day ==
As of 2016, Johnstown remains the township's industrial centre. According to the township's website, the industrial park focuses on transportation and logistics, intermodal facilities and light manufacturing. In addition to the Port of Johnstown, the village is home to the companies Greenfield Ethanol Inc., Ingredion Inc. and Prysmian Cables.

In 2006, it was announced that Canadian ethanol producer GreenField Ethanol had plans to build a new high capacity ethanol production plant in Johnstown's industrial park. Construction commenced in 2007, and operations at the plant began in December 2008. By early 2009, the plant had reached full production levels. The plant can produce 200,000,000 litres (52,834,410 US gal) of ethanol per year, making it the largest ethanol plant operated by GreenField.

In addition to the industrial park and large businesses, Johnstown is home to a church, a Jehovah's Witness Kingdom Hall, an elementary school and a convenience store and gas station. A Duty Free store operates at the foot of the bridge for those travelling internationally.

Johnstown is also home to a recreation area. The recreation area consists of a community pool as well as two regulation-sized softball diamonds, three beach volleyball courts, two tennis courts, three horseshoe pits and a soccer field. Additionally, there is a community hall on site which is used year-round for community events including weddings, banquets or picnics.

== Education and schools ==
During the era of one-room schoolhouses, Johnstown went through three schools. The first school to serve Johnstown was a frame building called Lee School built north of Second Street. According to records, the Board of Education stated in 1834 that this school was the only approved common school within the township. This building was eventually replaced around the 1860s by a stone building near the Johnstown Cemetery. In 1902, this school was replaced again by a brick building, built at the corner of Queen Street and Ontario Highway 2. Upon its construction, the third, brick school was painted many colours; the wainscotting was red while the walls and ceiling were blue and the floor was yellow. In 1941, it was repainted in a more neutral palette. In later years, the school became known as Johnstown Public School. The final schoolhouse was closed and demolished in 1961, and the bricks were used to construct a bungalow on the same site.

In the 1960s, a newer, modern school was constructed in Johnstown called South Edwardsburgh Public School. Officially opened on September 14, 1961, the six-room brick school was built to replace numerous rural schoolhouses in the area. By 1967, two more classrooms were added as well as a kindergarten and a general purpose room. As of 2018, this school remains open. For post-secondary schools, students have the option of attending South Grenville District High School in nearby Prescott.

== Churches ==
Prior to any churches being constructed in Johnstown the home of a local man named John McIlmoyl and the old gaol house were used to house meetings for the Anglican and Methodist congregations, who were serviced by a travelling minister. Johnstown eventually became home to two churches, built over 100 years apart; a Methodist church and a Jehovah’s Witness Kingdom Hall.

The Methodist church was constructed in 1879 through volunteer efforts and donated money and supplies. The church is a small, red brick church located along the St. Lawrence River near the international bridge. The church was built with a drive shed that also served as the church hall. In 1925, the church became the Johnstown United Church after a church union. In 1962, the church was moved closer to the river when Highway 2 was widened. At this time, the church also received new brickwork and a basement to serve as the new church hall. The drive shed was given to a local farmer to house cattle. The church saw more renovations in the 1980s when an extension was added, the roof was replaced and a wheelchair ramp was built.

In 1990, a Kingdom Hall was built for the local Jehovah’s Witnesses in Johnstown after the congregation outgrew their church in Prescott. The building was built to accommodate 180 people, and was in a more central location to most of its congregation. The building was constructed mostly through volunteer efforts, and was completed in only three days.

== Cemeteries ==
Johnstown is home to two cemeteries, both of which are amongst the oldest in the township. The first cemetery is North Channel Cemetery, located along Highway 2 outside of the village. This cemetery contains mostly members of the McIlmoyl family. The cemetery is also known as the Old Burying Ground or East Commons Cemetery. The oldest recorded and marked grave is that of Jerusha Plumley who died on April 12, 1801, at age 61. This grave is considered to be one of the oldest marked graves in the entire township. The entire cemetery was transcribed in both 1978 and 1983 and is maintained by the township. Burials no longer take place here.

The second graveyard is called Johnstown Cemetery, sometimes referred to as the Commons Cemetery. This cemetery is located along Queen Street, within the original townsite of Johnstown. One of the earliest stones in the cemetery belongs to a Thomas Dunlop, who died in 1808 at the age of 62. It was transcribed in 1983 and is maintained by the township. Johnstown Cemetery is non-denominational, and is still in use as of the late 1990s.

== Port of Johnstown ==
=== History ===
The Port of Johnstown was built in 1931 to replace a grain elevator located closer to the town of Prescott which operated from 1895 until 1931. Prior to the construction of the St. Lawrence Seaway, most grain carrying ships were too large to bypass the rapids between Prescott and Montreal; the port was built as a transfer point for the grain was needed. Once the Welland Canal was constructed in the late 1920s, the grain elevator near Prescott became inadequate and construction began on the current Port of Johnstown in 1928. The thousands of piles used for the building's foundations were supplied by local farmers. The port was built with a 5 million bushel capacity.

The Port of Johnstown had a positive effect on the village of Johnstown. The influx of labourers led to the community's expansion as more homes and boarding houses were built, and more businesses opened. Additionally, electrical power was first brought to the community due to the project.

Originally, the Port of Johnstown was owned and operated by the Department of Railways and Canals. After that, the port was operated by the National Harbours Board, and after the Seaway’s construction, Canada Ports Corporation. Elders of Australia leased the operation in 1988 for two years. The Port of Johnstown was then subleased to Goderich Elevator Co. until May 1994, when it again became the property of Canada Ports Corporation until it was purchased by the township of Edwardsburgh/Cardinal.

=== Modern day ===
On 10 December 2013, it was announced that the Port of Prescott, owned and operated by the Township of Edwardsburgh/Cardinal, was to become known as the Port of Johnstown, to better reflect its geographical situation. Its $35 million expansion, funded by municipal, provincial and federal governments, was planned to end with intermodal wharf of 465 ft (142 m) and 7.7 ha (19.0 acres) of storage area. The official grand opening was held on 26 June 2015.

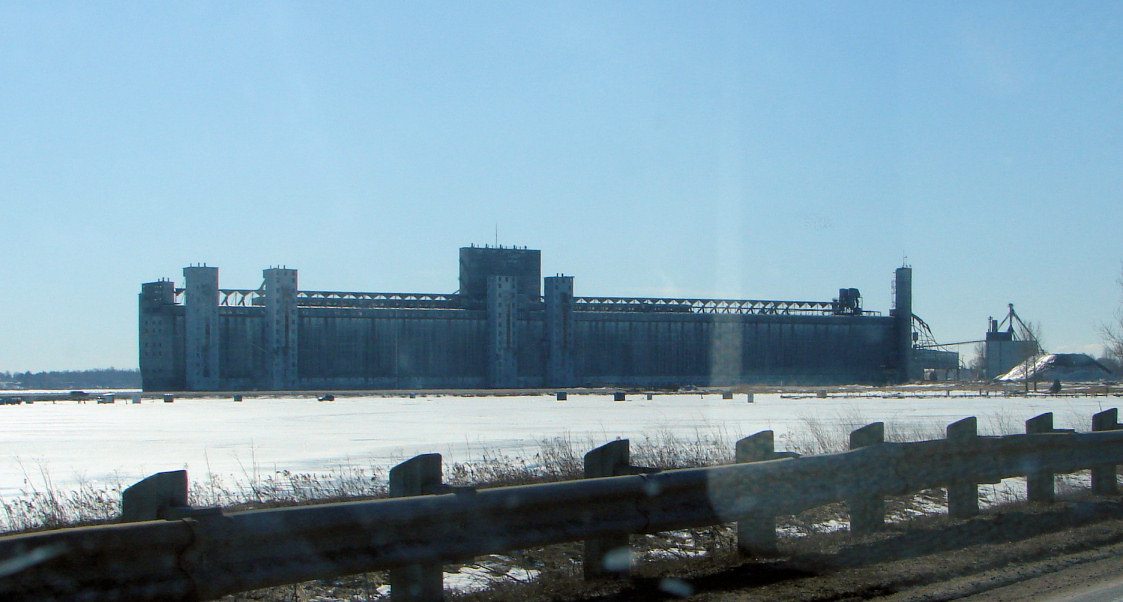
Port of Johnstown

Marine cargo had jumped 13 per cent in 2014 to 759,000 tonnes, a record amount since the Township of Edwardsburgh/Cardinal purchased the site for $10 from the federal government in October 2000. Total revenues of $6.6 million were about the same as the previous year, but revenue from marine services jumped $100,000 as the number of vessels jumped to 39 from 31 a year earlier. In 2014, the port had 25 full-time and 11 seasonal staff.

About 10 of 39 vessels carried road salt to replenish local supplies that dwindled during the winter of 2013. A record 527,678 tonnes of salt was unloaded in 2014 but a more encouraging figure may have been the 50,000 tonnes of aggregate shipped by vessel out of the port. For the first time since 2011, grain was offloaded by vessel at the port in 2014. Grain services continue to dominate port activity, accounting for 75 per cent of business revenues in 2014 when 634,717 tonnes of corn, soybean, wheat and other grains were processed through the facility.

=== Notable events ===
On September 1, 2015, the Port of Johnstown and the Ogdensburg-Prescott International Bridge made headlines after then Prime Minister Stephen Harper posted a video to his Facebook page standing in front of the port and bridge. The video was supposed to be a congratulatory video about the shipbuilding industry in the Halifax Harbour in Halifax, Nova Scotia, however upon its release, locals of Halifax noticed inconsistencies with the scenery compared to that of the Halifax Harbour and began to question where the video was actually shot. By September 5, viewers had determined the video was actually shot in Johnstown, Ontario based on the quick shot of the port in the background, which was unmistakably the Port of Johnstown. Viewers then accused Harper of trying to pass off the scenery as the Halifax Harbour due to the undeniable similarities between the Ogdensburg-Prescott bridge and the A. Murray MacKay Bridge in Halifax Harbour.
