= Salem Creek (Ontario) =

- Location of the mouth of the creek in southern Ontario
- Etymology: from the community of Salem

Location
- Country: Canada
- Province: Ontario
- County: Northumberland
- Municipality: Cramahe

Physical characteristics
- Source: Unnamed point
  - coordinates: 44°01′55″N 77°50′33″W
  - elevation: 140 m (460 ft)
- Mouth: Lake Ontario
  - coordinates: 44°00′00″N 77°49′54″W
  - elevation: 74.1 m (243 ft)
- Length: 4 km (2.5 mi)

Basin features
- River system: Lake Ontario drainage basin

Salem Creek is a stream in the municipal township of Cramahe, Northumberland County in Central Ontario, Canada. It is a tributary of Lake Ontario. The creek takes its name from the community of Salem which it flows past.

Salem Creek begins at an unnamed point at an elevation of 140 metres (460 ft) and flows south, past Salem Hill and the community of Salem. It heads under County Road 2 (formerly Ontario Highway 2), under the Canadian National Railway and Canadian Pacific Railway mainlines, and reaches its mouth at Lake Ontario at an elevation of 74.1 metres (243 ft).
