= Ontario Highway 30 =

Former Ontario provincial highway

Highway 30

Route information
- Maintained by Ministry of Transportation of Ontario
- Length: 51.1 km (31.8 mi)
- Existed: July 9, 1930–January 1, 1998
- History: Extended from Campbellford to Havelock March 28–April 11, 1934

Major junctions
- South end: Highway 2 in Brighton
- Highway 401 (Exit 509)
- North end: Highway 7 in Havelock

Location
- Country: Canada
- Province: Ontario
- Towns: Brighton, Campbellford, Trent River, Havelock

Highway system
- Ontario provincial highways; Current; Former; 400-series
← Highway 28	→ Highway 33
Former provincial highways
← Highway 29	Highway 31 →

King's Highway 30, commonly referred to as Highway 30, was a provincially maintained highway in the Canadian province of Ontario. The 51.1-kilometre (31.8 mi)-long route connected Highway 2 in Brighton with Highway 7 in Havelock via Campbellford. Established in 1930, the highway initially travelled only as far north as Campbellford. Alongside the construction of Highway 7 between Peterborough and Perth, Highway 30 was extended north to Havelock in 1934. The route remained generally consistent until 1998, when it was decommissioned and transferred to Northumberland County and Peterborough County. Both counties redesignated their portion of the former highway as County Road 30.

== Route description ==
Highway 30 began at former Highway 2 (Main Street) in downtown Brighton, following Young Street northward and meandering out of town towards an interchange with Highway 401. It continued to meander northward through the communities of Hilton and Orland before straightening out. It passed through Codrington, but otherwise encountered stretches of farmland or forests. The route eventually curved to the northeast to meet the Trent River in Meyersburg. It paralleled the river into Campbellford, taking on the local name of Grand Road. In downtown Campbellford, Highway 30 turned west onto Bridge Street West and followed it out of town before curving north. It continued through farmland along a generally straight course to Havelock, crossing the Trent River and skirting the community of the same name several kilometres to the south. Entering Havelock, the highway took on the name Concession Street, and terminated at Highway 7; Concession Street continued north as Peterborough County Road 46, as it is still known.

== History ==
On July 9, 1930, the Department of Highways, predecessor to the Ministry of Transportation of Ontario, assumed the 32 km (20 mi), gravel-surfaced Brighton–Campbellford Road. Unemployment relief measures carried out in 1931 and 1932 resulted in the construction of Highway 7 between Peterborough and Ottawa. As a result, Highway 30 was extended north from Campbellford to Havelock in 1934 along existing roads. The section within Peterborough County was assumed on March 28, while the section within Northumberland County was assumed on April 11.

Highway 30 originally crossed the Trent River on this bridge, which still remains, to connect with Church Street on the northern shore. A replacement was opened in 1968, bypassing the old route.

In 1936 work began to grade and improve Highway 30 along its entire length. By the end of 1937, paving was completed several kilometres south of Havelock as well as from Campbellford south to Northumberland County Road 29. A gravel base was laid from there to south of Orland. The remainder of the road was gravelled. A diversion was also constructed at Meyersburg, bypassing the junction with Percy Boom Road. Between 1942 and 1949, paving was completed on the gravel section between Brighton and Campbellford. The remaining gravel section, between Campbellford and Havelock, was paved in 1951.

Highway 401 opened between Brighton and Trenton on November 25, 1958. Traffic could only proceed east to Trenton until the gap between Port Hope and Trenton was opened on July 20, 1961. A new bridge was built over the Trent Canal in 1968, bypassing the route along Church Street. Highway 30 remained generally unchanged over the next 30 years, until January 1, 1998, when the entire route was decommissioned and transferred to Northumberland and Peterborough counties. It was subsequently designated as Northumberland County Road 30 and Peterborough County Road 30.

== Major intersections ==
The following table lists the major junctions along Highway 30, as noted by the Ministry of Transportation of Ontario.

Division	Location	km	mi	Destinations	Notes
Northumberland	Brighton	0.0	0.0	County Road 2 west (Main Street) – Cobourg, Port Hope	Formerly Highway 2
Northumberland	Brighton	2.3	1.4	County Road 26 north	
Northumberland	Brighton	5.0	3.1	Highway 401 – Toronto, Kingston	Exit 509
Northumberland	Brighton	7.1	4.4	County Road 21 west (Dundonald Road)	Hilton
Northumberland	Brighton	11.4	7.1	County Road 41 east – Wooler	Formerly County Road 28 until Highway 28 was downloaded in 1998; Orland
Northumberland	Brighton	15.3	9.5	County Road 27 west – Morganston	Codrington
Northumberland	Brighton	21.9	13.6	County Road 29 (Percy Boom Road) – Warkworth	
Northumberland	Trent Hills	21.9	13.6	County Road 29 (Percy Boom Road) – Warkworth	
Northumberland	Trent Hills	25.9	16.1	Percy Boom Road	
Northumberland	Campbellford	32.8	20.4	County Road 8 east (Bridge Street) – Stirling; County Road 50 north (Queen Street)	
Northumberland	Trent Hills	35.8	22.2	County Road 35 west	
Northumberland	Trent Hills	47.0	29.2	County Road 36	
Peterborough	Havelock	50.1	31.1	Old Norwood Road	Old crossroads before Highway 7 was constructed
Peterborough	Havelock	51.1	31.8	Highway 7 (Ottawa Street)	
1.000 mi = 1.609 km; 1.000 km = 0.621 mi
