= Ontario Highway 32 =

Former Ontario provincial highway

King's Highway 32
- Leeds and Grenville County Road 32

Route information
- Maintained by Ministry of Transportation of Ontario
- Length: 19.6 km (12.2 mi)
- Existed: July 24, 1929–January 1, 1998

Major junctions
- South end: Highway 2 (King Street) in Gananoque
- Highway 401 (Exit 645)
- North end: Highway 15 east of Seeleys Bay

Location
- Country: Canada
- Province: Ontario
- Counties: United Counties of Leeds and Grenville
- Towns: Gananoque

Highway system
- Ontario provincial highways; Current; Former; 400-series
| ← Highway 28 | → Highway 33 |
Former provincial highways
| ← Highway 30 |

King's Highway 32, commonly referred to as Highway 32, was a provincially maintained highway in the Canadian province of Ontario. The 19.6-kilometre (12.2 mi)-long route connected Highway 2 in Gananoque with Highway 15 east of Seeleys Bay, providing a quick alternative route between the two highways. It also featured an interchange with Highway 401. Highway 32 was assumed in 1929, and generally remained unchanged throughout its existence until 1998, when it was decommissioned and transferred to the United Counties of Leeds and Grenville. It was subsequently redesignated as Leeds and Grenville County Road 32.

== Route description ==
Highway 32 began at Highway 2 (King Street) in Gananoque and proceeded north for 19.6 km (12.2 mi) to Highway 15. Within Gananoque, the road was known as Stone Street North. An interchange with Highway 401 lay just north of the town, north of which the former highway travelled through farmland and forests. Today, the route is known as Leeds and Grenville County Road 32, and lays entirely within Leeds and the Thousand Islands with the exception to portion within the town of Gananoque.

== History ==
Highway 32 was assumed on July 24, 1929, following the unimproved road between Gananoque and Highway 15. The route was improved with a gravel surface by 1937 and paved between 1942 and 1949.

The interchange with Highway 401 was opened along with the freeway itself on August 6, 1959, connecting the existing Kingston Bypass and Thousand Islands Parkway. A new bridge was completed over the Gananoque River in 1961, bypassing the original route a short distance to the north and improving the highway geometry. Highway 32 remained generally unchanged until January 1, 1998, when the entire route was decommissioned and transferred to the United Counties of Leeds and Grenville. It has since been known as Leeds and Grenville County Road 32.

== Major intersections ==
The following table lists the major junctions along Highway 32, as noted by the Ministry of Transportation of Ontario. The entire route was located in the United Counties of Leeds and Grenville.

| Location | km | mi | Destinations | Notes |
|---|---|---|---|---|
| Gananoque | 0.0 | 0.0 | County Road 2 (King Street) – Kingston, Cornwall | Formerly Highway 2 |
| Leeds and the Thousand Islands | 1.6 | 0.99 | Highway 401 – Kingston, Cornwall | Exit 645 |
| Leeds and the Thousand Islands | 3.0 | 1.9 | County Road 35 | |
| Leeds and the Thousand Islands | 8.4 | 5.2 | County Road 13 | |
| Leeds and the Thousand Islands | 19.6 | 12.2 | Highway 15 | |
1.000 mi = 1.609 km; 1.000 km = 0.621 mi
