= Quebec Route 1 =

Former highway in Canada

Route 1

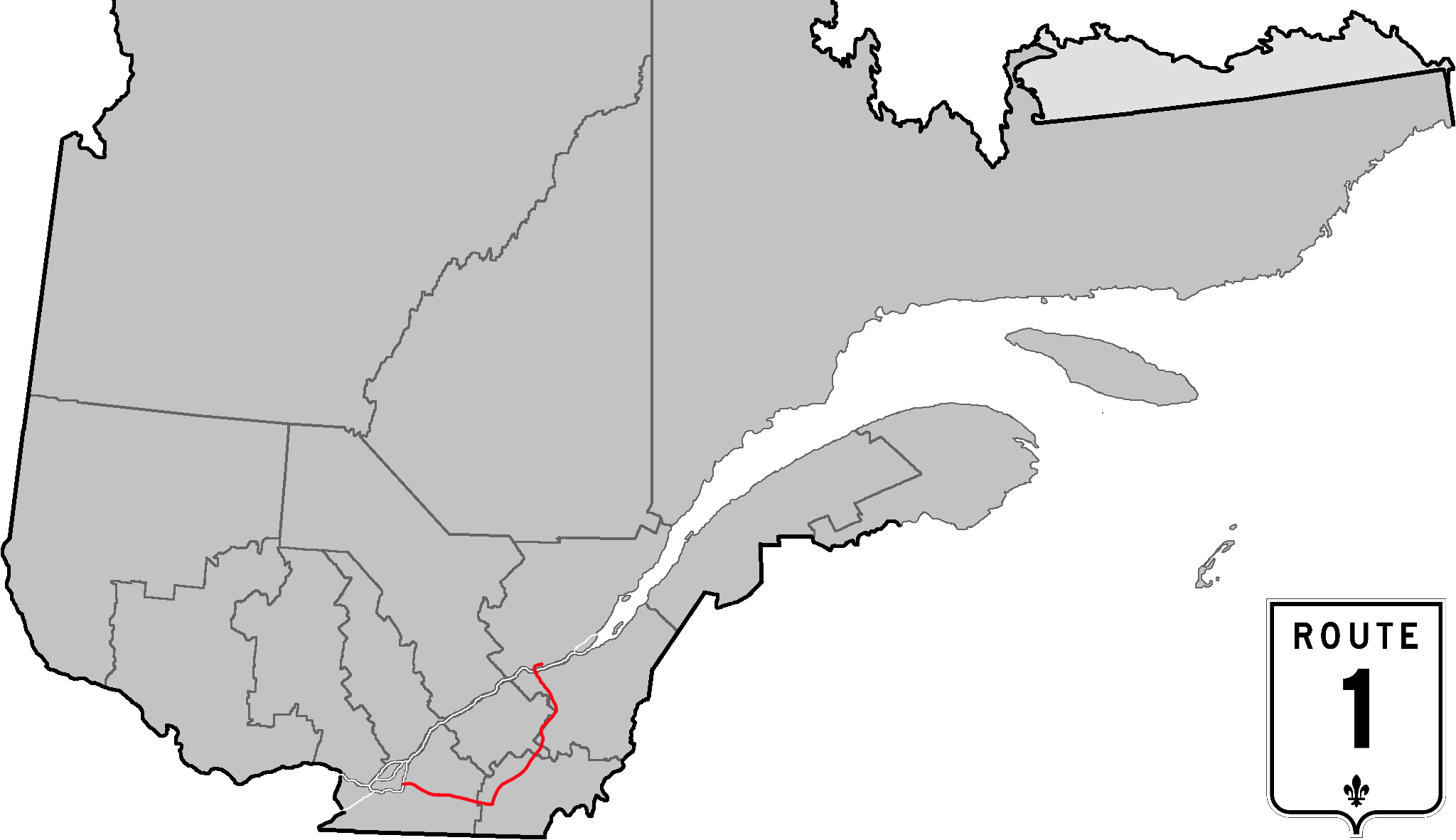

Route information
- Length: 676 km (420 mi)

Major junctions
- West end: Route 2 / Route 3 / Route 9 in Montreal
- Route 9 in Saint-Hubert; Route 5 / Route 22 in Sherbrooke; Route 23 / Route 28 at Vallée-Jonction
- East end: Route 5 / Route 9 / Route 15 in Quebec City

Location
- Country: Canada
- Province: Quebec
- Major cities: Montreal, Sherbrooke, Quebec City

Highway system
- Quebec provincial highways; Autoroutes; List; Former
← A-973	→ Route 2

Route 1 was a previous number used for a major highway in the Canadian province of Quebec. The highway stretched from Montreal, through the Eastern Townships and the city of Sherbrooke, to Quebec City. Route 1 was approximately 676 km (420 mi) long.

In the mid-1970s, as part of Quebec's renumbering scheme, Route 1 was replaced by the following routes:

Route	Length (km)	Length (mi)	From	To	Notes
R-134	3	2	Montréal	Montréal-Sud	Crosses the Jacques Cartier Bridge; cosigned with former Route 5.
R-132	4	2	Montréal-Sud	Longueuil	Cosigned with former Route 3.
Chambly Road	12	7	Longueuil	Saint-Hubert	No longer carries a route number.
R-112	317	197	Saint-Hubert	Vallée-Jonction	
R-173	285	177	Vallée-Jonction	Saint-Maxime	
R-171	31	19	Saint-Maxime	Saint-Étienne-de-Lauzon	
R-116	12	7	Saint-Étienne-de-Lauzon	Lévis	
R-175	12	7	Lévis	Quebec City (downtown)	Crosses the Quebec Bridge.
