= Quebec Route 2 =

Former highway designation

Route 2

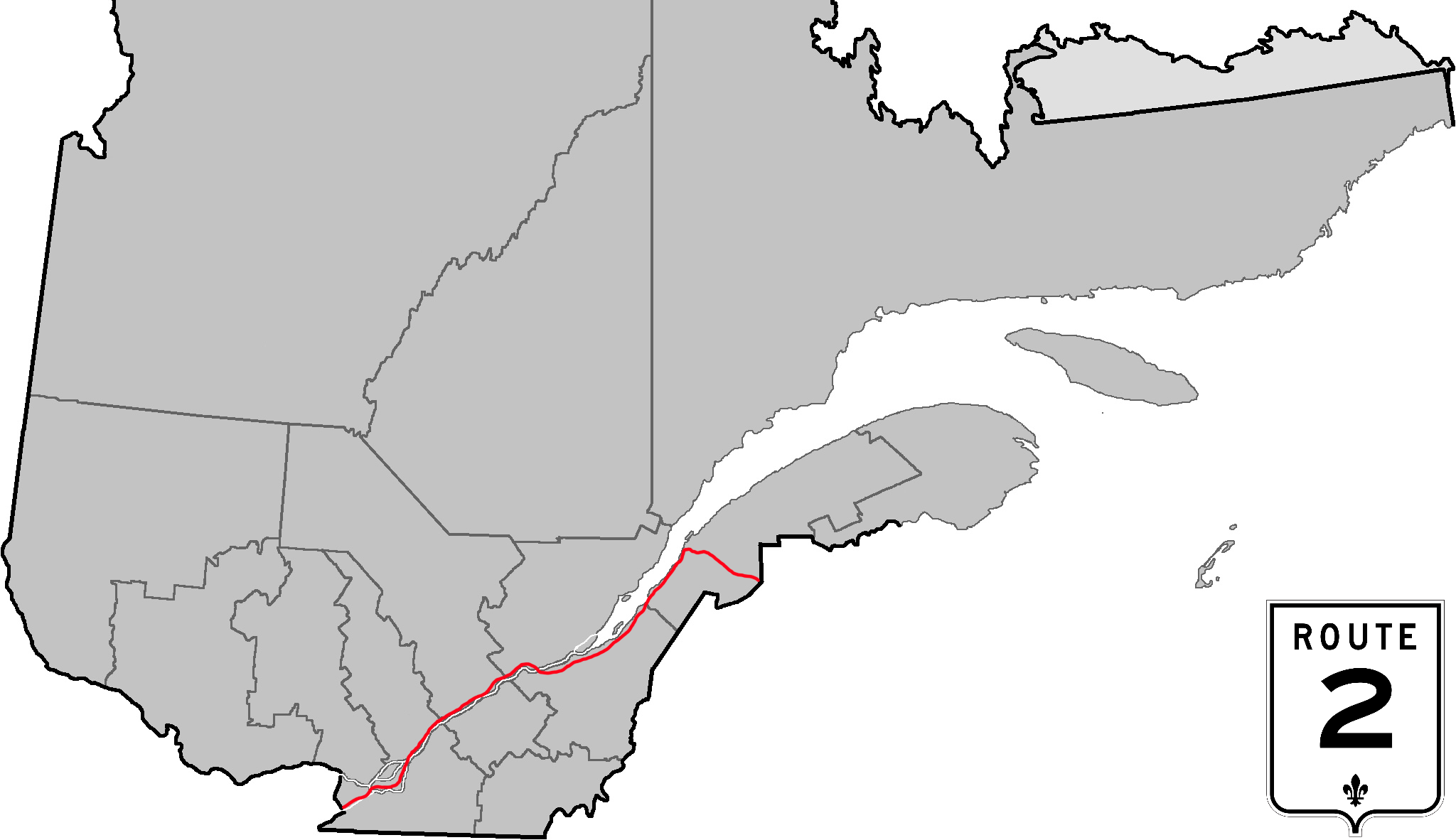

Route information
- Length: 668 km (415 mi)

Major junctions
- West end: Highway 2 (former) at the Ontario border at Rivière-Beaudette
- Route 17 in Vaudreuil-Dorion; Route 4 in St-Pierre; Route 8 / Route 9 / Route 11 in Montreal; Route 19 in Trois-Rivières; Route 1 / Route 5 / Route 9 in Quebec City; Route 3 in Charny; Route 23 / Route 28 in Lévis; Route 10 in Rivière-du-Loup
- East end: Route 2 at the New Brunswick border near Dégelis

Location
- Country: Canada
- Province: Quebec
- Major cities: Montreal, Trois-Rivières, Quebec City

Highway system
- Quebec provincial highways; Autoroutes; List; Former
← Route 1	→ Route 3

Route 2 was a previous number used for a major highway in the Canadian province of Quebec. The highway stretched from the Ontario border at Rivière-Beaudette to the New Brunswick border southeast of Dégelis. The highway was part of a de facto interprovincial Route 2 that stretched from Windsor, Ontario to Halifax, Nova Scotia, connecting Ontario Highway 2 to New Brunswick Route 2, and further to Nova Scotia, connecting with Trunk 2. It was renumbered in the mid-1970s, as part of Quebec's renumbering scheme.

== Replacement routes ==
Route 2 was replaced by the following routes:

Route	Length (km)	Length (mi)	From	To	Notes
R-338	41	25	Ontario border at Rivière-Beaudette	Vaudreuil-Dorion	Connects with Ontario border today with SD&G County Road 2, formerly Ontario Highway 2
A-20	33	21	Vaudreuil-Dorion	Montreal	During the 1960s until being renumbered, Route 2 and the A-20 ran concurrently; this stretch was referred to by Anglophone Montrealers as Highway 2-20 (or "The Two and Twenty").
R-138	285	177	Montreal	Quebec City (downtown)	This follows the original 1737 Chemin du Roy
R-136	12	7	Quebec City (downtown)	Quebec City (Sainte-Foy)	
R-175	2	1	Quebec City (Sainte-Foy)	Lévis	Crosses the Quebec Bridge
R-132	197	122	Lévis	Rivière-du-Loup	
A-85 / R-185	98	61	Rivière-du-Loup	New Brunswick border southeast of Dégelis	Used to connect at border with New Brunswick Route 2; portions of the original Route 2 are along local roads downloaded to local governments during the conversion of Route 185 to Autoroute 85

== Auxiliary routes ==
Route 2 had three auxiliary routes.

=== Route 2A ===
Route 2A
- Location: Sainte-Anne-de-la-Pocatière – Andréville
- Length: 52 km (32 mi)

Route 2A was a 52 km (32 mi) alternate route of Route 2, passing through the communities of Saint-Pacôme and Saint-Pascal. As part of Quebec's renumbering scheme, Route 2A became part of Route 230.

=== Route 2B ===
Route 2B
- Location: Montreal
- Length: 10 km (6.2 mi)

Route 2B was a 10 km (6 mi) spur of Route 2. It ran along Côte-de-Liesse Road from the former Route 2 / Route 17 concurrency in Dorval, past the Montreal–Dorval International Airport, to a traffic circle in Saint-Laurent where it met Laurentien Boulevard and Décarie Boulevard (Route 8 / Route 11A). The route was replaced by Autoroute 520 and its former eastern terminus is now the site of the Décarie Interchange.

=== Route 2C ===
Route 2C
- Location: Quebec City
- Length: 14 km (8.7 mi)

Route 2C was a 14 km (9 mi) spur of Route 2 which ran along Boulevard Wilfrid-Hamel in Quebec City from Route 2 on the city's western edge to downtown. As part of Quebec's renumbering scheme, Route 2C became part of Route 138.

Interprovincial Highway 2
Previous route ON Highway 2	Route 2	Next route NB Route 2
