= Salem, Northumberland County, Ontario =

Salem
- Dispersed Rural Community
- Location in southern Ontario
- Coordinates: 44°01′03″N 77°50′20″W
- Country: Canada
- Province: Ontario
- County: Northumberland
- Municipality: Cramahe
- Elevation: 103 m (338 ft)
- Time zone: UTC-5 (Eastern Time Zone)
  - Summer (DST): UTC-4 (Eastern Time Zone)
- Postal Code: K0K 1S0
- Area codes: 905, 289, 365

Salem is a Dispersed Rural Community and unincorporated place in the municipal township of Cramahe, Northumberland County in southern Ontario, Canada. The community is on Northumberland County Road 2 (formerly Ontario Highway 2) about 4 kilometres (2.5 mi) east of Colborne and 9 kilometres (5.6 mi) west of Brighton.

The community gives its name to two nearby geographic features: Salem Creek, which flows past the community to Lake Ontario; and Salem Hill, which rises to the north of the community.
