= Quebec Route 338 =

Highway in Quebec, Canada

Route 338

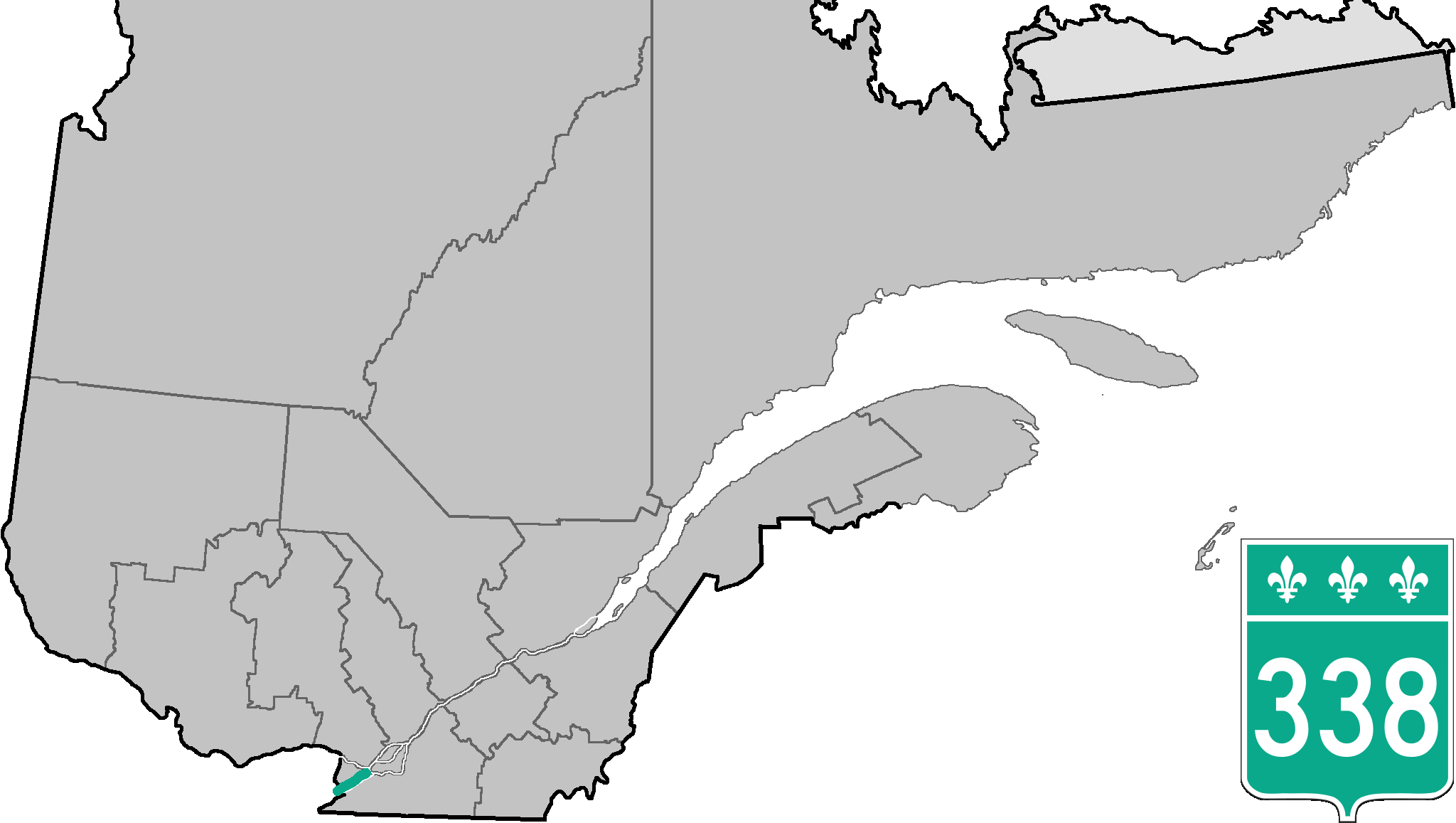

Route information
- Maintained by Transports Québec
- Length: 40.9 km (25.4 mi)
- History: Route 2

Major junctions
- West end: County Road 2 at the Ontario border (formerly Highway 2)
- R-325 in Rivière-Beaudette; R-201 in Coteau-du-Lac; A-30 in Les Cèdres
- East end: A-20 in Vaudreuil-Dorion

Location
- Country: Canada
- Province: Quebec
- Major cities: Coteau-du-Lac, Vaudreuil-Dorion

Highway system
- Quebec provincial highways; Autoroutes; List; Former
← R-337	→ R-339

Route 338 is a provincial highway located in the Montérégie region of Quebec west of Montreal. The highway runs from the Ontario Border near Rivière-Beaudette as a continuation of Stormont, Dundas and Glengarry County Road 2 and ends in Vaudreuil-Dorion at the junction of Autoroute 20. The 338 acts as an alternate and service route parallel to A-20 although through several villages along the Saint Lawrence River. Before the 1970s, this road was named "Route 2", as part of an interprovincial Route 2 that stretched from Windsor, Ontario to Halifax, Nova Scotia.

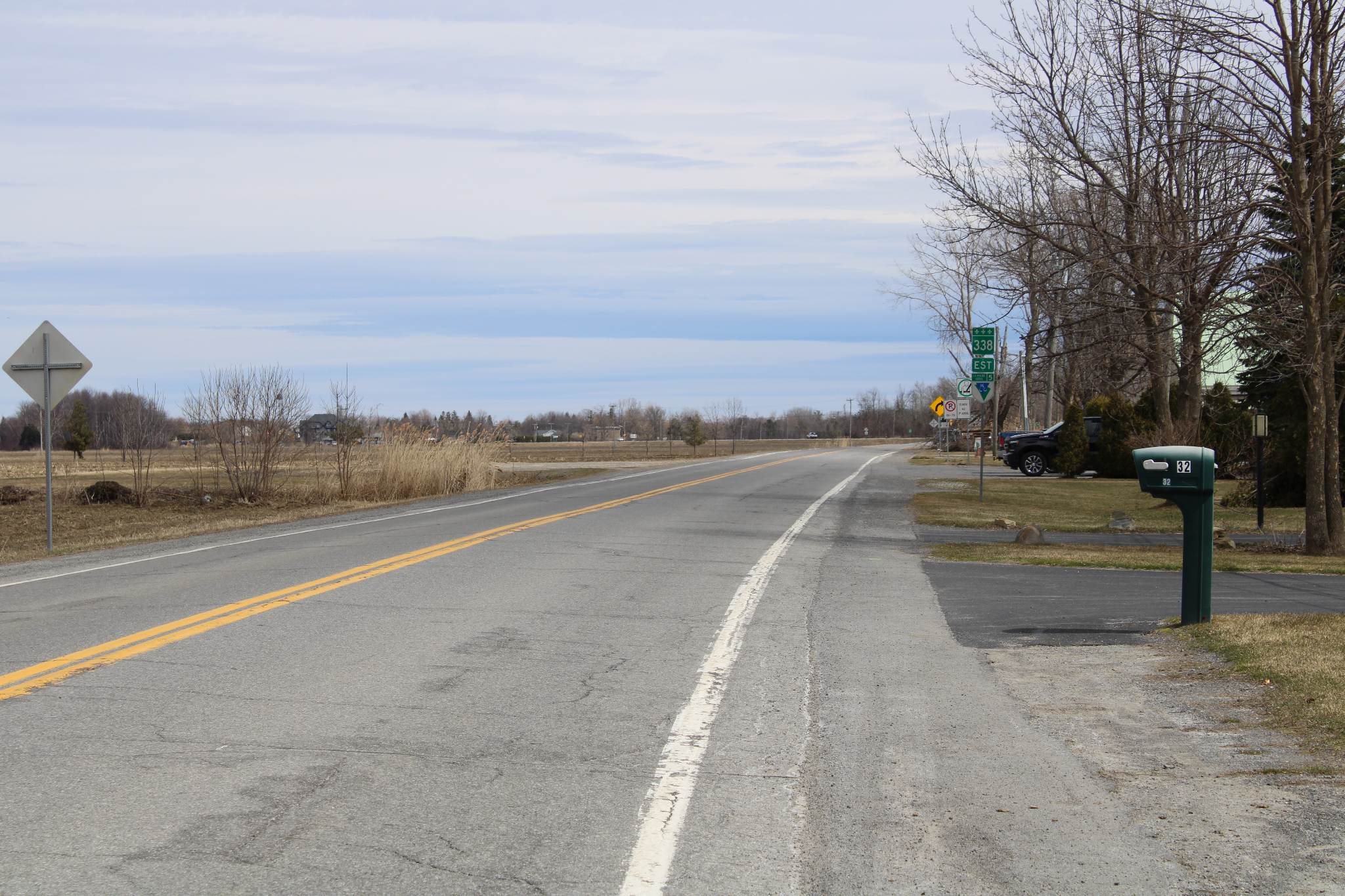
Route 338 at the Ontario border looking towards Rivière-Beaudette

== Municipalities along Route 338 ==
- Rivière-Beaudette
- Saint-Zotique
- Les Coteaux
- Coteau-du-Lac
- Les Cèdres
- Pointe-des-Cascades
- Vaudreuil-Dorion

== Major intersections ==
The entire route is in Vaudreuil-Soulanges RCM.

Location	km	mi	Destinations	Notes
Rivière-Beaudette	0.0	0.0	County Road 2 west – South Glengarry, Cornwall	Continuation into Ontario; formerly Highway 2 west
Rivière-Beaudette	2.3	1.4	R-325 north – Saint-Télesphore	
Saint-Zotique	8.8	5.5	34^{e} Avenue	
Les Coteaux	11.9	7.4	Montée du Comté	
Coteau-du-Lac	14.6	9.1	R-201 to A-20 – Salaberry-de-Valleyfield, Saint-Clet	Interchange
Coteau-du-Lac	17.4	10.8	Rue Principale to R-201 north – Saint-Clet	
Les Cèdres	26.7	16.6	Chemin Saint-Féréol	
Les Cèdres	17.4	10.8	A-30 – Vaudreuil-Dorion, Sorel-Tracy	Interchange; A-30 exit 9
Vaudreuil-Dorion	40.9	25.4	A-20 – Toronto, Montreal	At-grade intersection
1.000 mi = 1.609 km; 1.000 km = 0.621 mi: Route transition

== See also ==
- List of Quebec provincial highways
