= Ontario Highway 2 =

Former Ontario provincial highway

Highway 2
- Highway 2 highlighted in red

Route information
- Maintained by Ministry of Transportation of Ontario
- Length: 0.9 km (0.56 mi; 3,000 ft) 834.56 km (518.57 mi) before 1997
- History: 1794 as the Governor's Road; August 21, 1917, as The Provincial Highway

Major junctions
- West end: Gananoque eastern limits
- East end: Highway 401 westbound off ramp

Location
- Country: Canada
- Province: Ontario
- Major cities: (Before 1996) Windsor, Chatham, London, Brantford, Hamilton, Burlington, Mississauga, Toronto, Oshawa Belleville, Kingston, Cornwall

Highway system
- Ontario provincial highways; Current; Former; 400-series
| ← Highway 811 | → Highway 3 |
Former provincial highways
| Highway 2A → |

King's Highway 2, commonly referred to as Highway 2, is the lowest-numbered provincially maintained highway in the Canadian province of Ontario, and was originally part of a series of identically numbered highways which started in Windsor, stretched through Quebec and New Brunswick, and ended in Halifax, Nova Scotia. Prior to the 1990s, Highway 2 travelled through many of the major cities in Southern Ontario, including Windsor, Chatham, London, Brantford, Hamilton, Burlington, Mississauga, Toronto, Oshawa, Belleville, Kingston and Cornwall, and many other smaller towns and communities.

Once the primary east–west route across the southern portion of Ontario, most of Highway 2 was bypassed by Highway 401, which was completed in 1968. The August 1997 completion of Highway 403 bypassed one final section through Brantford. Virtually, all of the 847.3-kilometre (526.5 mi) length of Highway 2 was deemed a local route and removed from the provincial highway system by January 1, 1998, with the exception of a one-kilometre (0.62 mi) section east of Gananoque. The entire route remains driveable, but as County Road 2 or County Highway 2 in most regions.

The Gananoque welcome arch, facing east towards the remaining provincial portion of Highway 2

Portions of what became Highway 2 served as early settlement trails, post roads and stagecoach routes. While the arrival of the railroad in the mid-19th century diminished the importance of the route, the advent of the bicycle and later the automobile renewed interest in roadbuilding. A 73.7-kilometre (45.8 mi) segment of Highway 2 between Pickering and Port Hope was the first section of roadway assumed by the newly-formed Department of Public Highways (DPHO) on August 21, 1917. By the end of 1920, the department had taken over roads connecting Windsor with the Quebec boundary at Rivière-Beaudette, which it would number as Provincial Highway 2 in the summer of 1925. In 1930, the DPHO was renamed the Department of Highways (DHO), and provincial highways became King's Highways. By this time, it was one of the dominant transportation arteries across southern Ontario and was 878.2 km (545.7 mi) long.

The section of Highway 2 between Hamilton and Toronto along Lakeshore Road became the first paved intercity road in Ontario in 1914. Beginning in the mid-1930s, the DHO began reconstructing several portions of the highway into the new German-inspired "dual highway", including east from Scarborough along Kingston Road. This would be the progenitor to Highway 401, which was built in a patchwork fashion across Southern Ontario throughout the 1950s and early 1960s, often as bypass of and parallel to Highway 2 (except between Woodstock and Toronto). Conversely, the importance of Highway 2 for long-distance travel was all but eliminated, and coupled with the increasing suburbanization of the Greater Toronto Area, it became simply a series of urban arterials street between Hamilton and Oshawa.

Having been replaced in importance by the parallel freeways of Highway 401, the Queen Elizabeth Way, and finally Highway 403, the province gradually transferred sections of the route back to the municipal, county and regional governments that it passed through, a process known as downloading. In 1997 and 1998, the province downloaded 391.6 kilometres (243.3 mi) of Highway 2 and rescinded dozens of Connecting Link agreements, reducing the route to its current length.

== Route description ==
Since 1998, Highway 2 has remained in the provincial highway system solely as a connection between westbound Thousand Islands Parkway and eastbound Highway 401. Highway 2 begins at the eastern town limits of Gananoque, and travels east a short distance before gently curving northward. It meets an interchange with the Thousand Islands Parkway—once referred to as Highway 2S, prior to becoming a temporary part of Highway 401 in 1952—and ends at the westbound Highway 401 offramp (Exit 648). The roadway continues as Leeds and Grenville County Road 2 both east and west of the remaining highway segment.

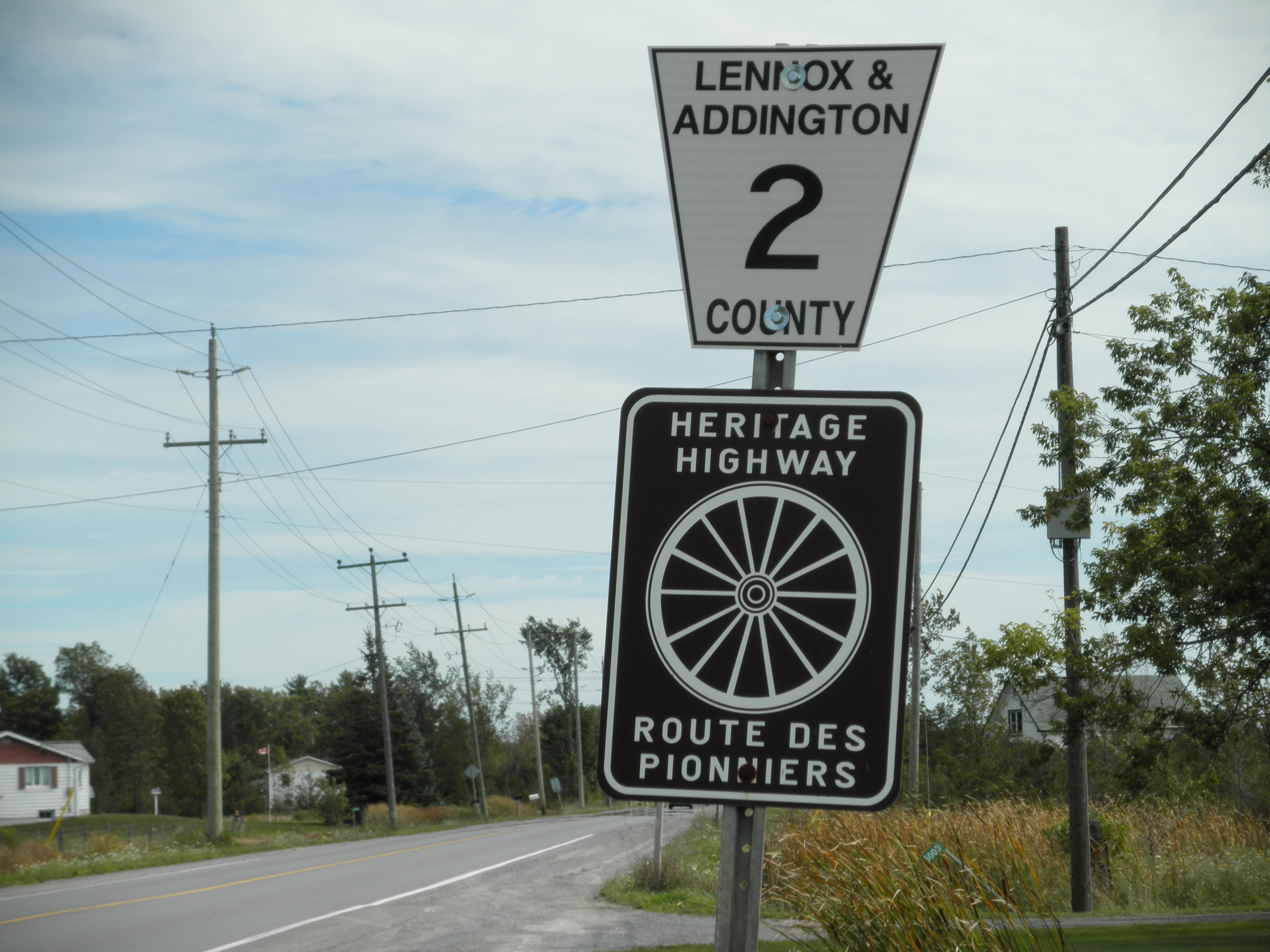
A former portion of Highway 2 in Lennox and Addington County cosigned as the Heritage Highway

=== Before 1997 ===
Before being mostly-decommissioned as a provincial highway in the mid-1990s, Highway 2 was a continuous route from Highway 3 in Windsor to the Quebec border. Prior to the arrival of Highway 401 in the 1950s and early 1960s, Highway 2 was the primary east–west route across the southern portion of Ontario. At one time it connected with Quebec Route 2, which was renumbered in 1966 as multiple highways, and onwards to New Brunswick Route 2 and Nova Scotia Trunk 2 to end in Halifax. New Brunswick reassigned Route 2 to a new freeway running between Fredericton and Moncton in 2007, while Nova Scotia kept its portion of Highway 2 intact, numbering its bypass as Highway 102 and Highway 104.

In 1972, the Ontario and Quebec governments designated Highway/Route 2 from Windsor to Rivière-du-Loup as the Heritage Highway (Route des Pionniers), a tourist route which continued eastward to the Gaspé Peninsula on what is now Quebec Route 132. This tourist route included various side trips, such as highways to Ottawa and Niagara Falls. While this signage is maintained in some counties, others have promoted local tours, including the Apple Route between Trenton and Brighton, the Arts Route in Hastings County, and the Chemin du Roy (The King's Way, now Route 138) between Montreal and Quebec City.

==== Windsor–Mississauga ====
Within Ontario and prior to 1997, Highway 2 began in Windsor at the interchange between the E. C. Row Expressway and Highway 3 (Huron Church Road), where it also met the northern terminus of Highway 18. It followed the expressway east through Windsor, with the divided highway transitioning to an urban arterial road near Lesperance Road. It travelled nearby the south shoreline of Lake St. Clair as it bisected Emeryville and Belle River before curving south briefly. It then turned east and travelled through a rural setting to Tilbury, where it met Highway 401 at two interchanges (Exit 56 and 63). Crossing from Essex County to Kent County, the highway curved northeast and passed through Chatham—where it intersected Highway 40—Louisville and Thamesville—where it intersected Highway 21—before entering Middlesex County near Bothwell—where it met Highway 79.

Between Chatham and Delaware, Highway 2 travelled roughly parallel to and north of the Thames River. It passed through the communities of Wardsville, Strathburn—intersecting Highway 76 and Highway 80—and Melbourne before encountering an interchange with Highway 402 and crossing the Thames River. Within Delaware, the highway intersected Highway 81 and turned east. At Lambeth it met Highway 4 and the two highways travelled concurrent northeast into London. In downtown London, Highway 2 and Highway 4 parted at the intersection of York Street and Richmond Street, with Highway 2 continuing east along the former. It intersected the northern end of Highway 100, now known as the Veterans Memorial Parkway. While the route was south of the Thames River between Delaware and London, it continued east along Dundas Street between the two branches of the river between London and Woodstock, intersecting Highway 19 between the two in the community of Thamesford.

At Woodstock, Highway 2 intersected Highway 59 and met Highway 401 at an interchange near the split with Highway 403. It then continued east, becoming parallel with the latter towards Hamilton. It intersected with Highway 53 at Eastwood and passed through the communities of Creditville, Gobles and Falkland before entering Paris. Within Paris, the highway intersected Highway 24A and met the western terminus of Highway 5, with which it remained within 15 kilometres (9.3 mi) through to Toronto. Highway 2 branched southeast through Brantford, where it intersected Highway 24 and became concurrent with Highway 53 before meeting the end of Highway 403 at Cainsville; Highway 54 branched south from there.

Before 1997, Highway 403 was discontinuous between Cainsville and Ancaster, intersecting and merging into Highway 2 at both locations. The combined Highway 2/53 travelled east through Alberton, before splitting at Duff's Corners. Highway 2 split to the northeast, and Highway 403 resumed at what is now Exit 58. Highway 2 then travelled through Ancaster, became concurrent with Highway 8 and entered into Hamilton. Following a series of streets, the routes split, and Highway 2 travelled north, now concurrent with Highway 6. The two routes split northeast of Burlington Bay, with Highway 2 turning northeast into Burlington, encountering an interchange with the Queen Elizabeth Way at North Shore Boulevard. North Shore becomes Lakeshore Road, which the highway followed through Oakville and Mississauga along the shore of Lake Ontario towards Toronto.

==== Toronto–Quebec ====
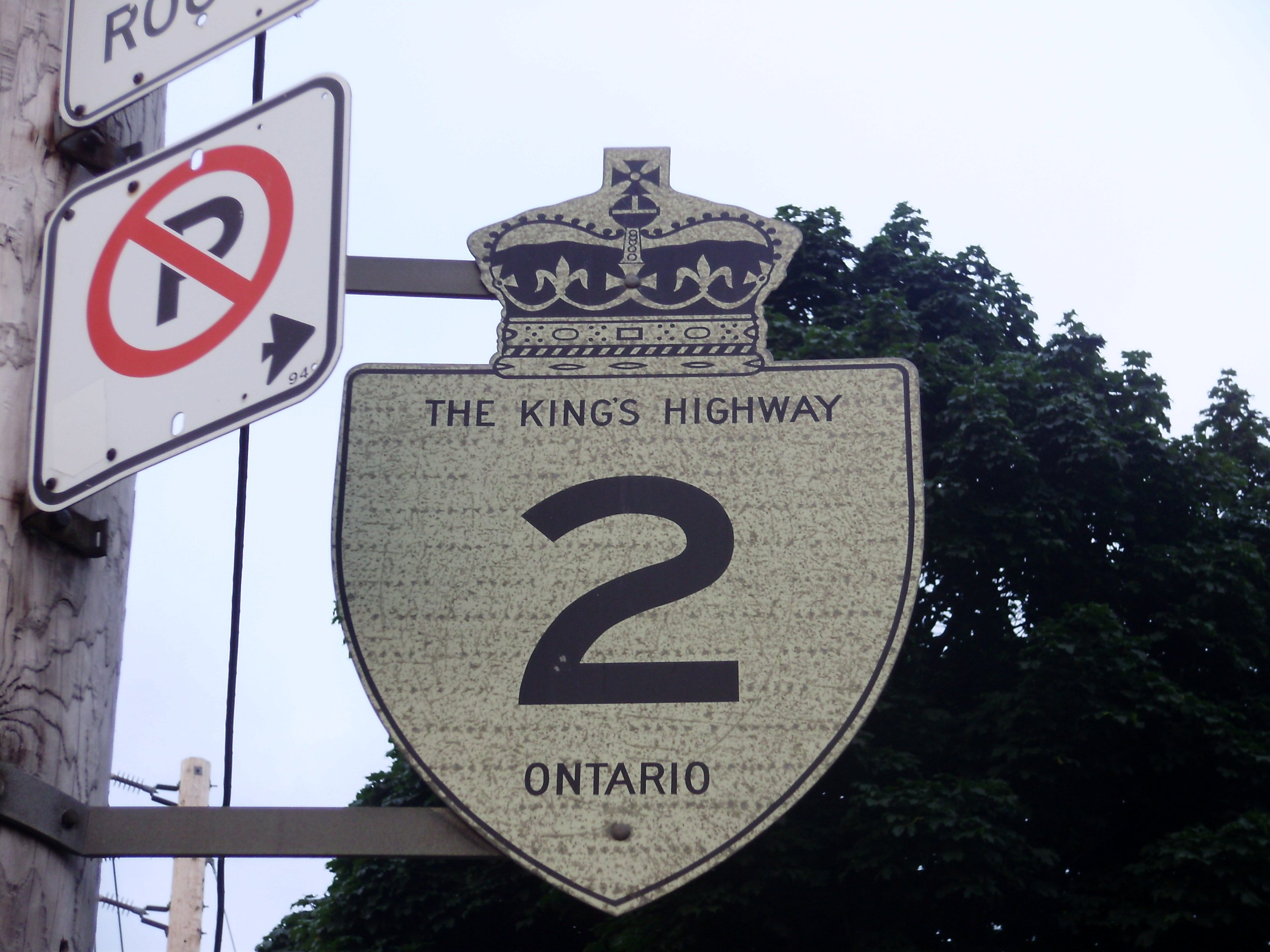
A former Highway 2 reassurance marker along Lake Shore Blvd. in Toronto

At the Etobicoke Creek, Highway 2 entered Etobicoke, one of the six municipalities in Metropolitan Toronto that amalgamated to form the present City of Toronto in 1998. At that point Lakeshore Road also transitioned to Lake Shore Boulevard. It intersected the southern end of Highway 27 and travelled through the community of New Toronto, where numerous motels flourished during the golden age of the automobile which have since given way to condominium development. Approaching the west bank of the Humber River which was the eastern terminus of the Queen Elizabeth Way until 1998, the Highway 2 route merged onto the Gardiner Expressway via an on-ramp from Lake Shore Boulevard. Highway 2 proceeded to follow the Gardiner around Humber Bay and then through Downtown Toronto on the Gardiner's elevated section. Beyond the Don Valley Parkway interchange, the Gardiner descended to ground level and ended, so Highway 2 rejoined Lakeshore Boulevard near Leslie Street. Highway 2 continued east, splitting into two routes; one continuing along Lake Shore until it curved north as it transitioned into Woodbine Avenue and the second via Coxwell Avenue and a short stretch of Queen Street to then follow Kingston Road. The two routes then rejoined at Woodbine and Kingston, following the latter northeast into Scarborough.

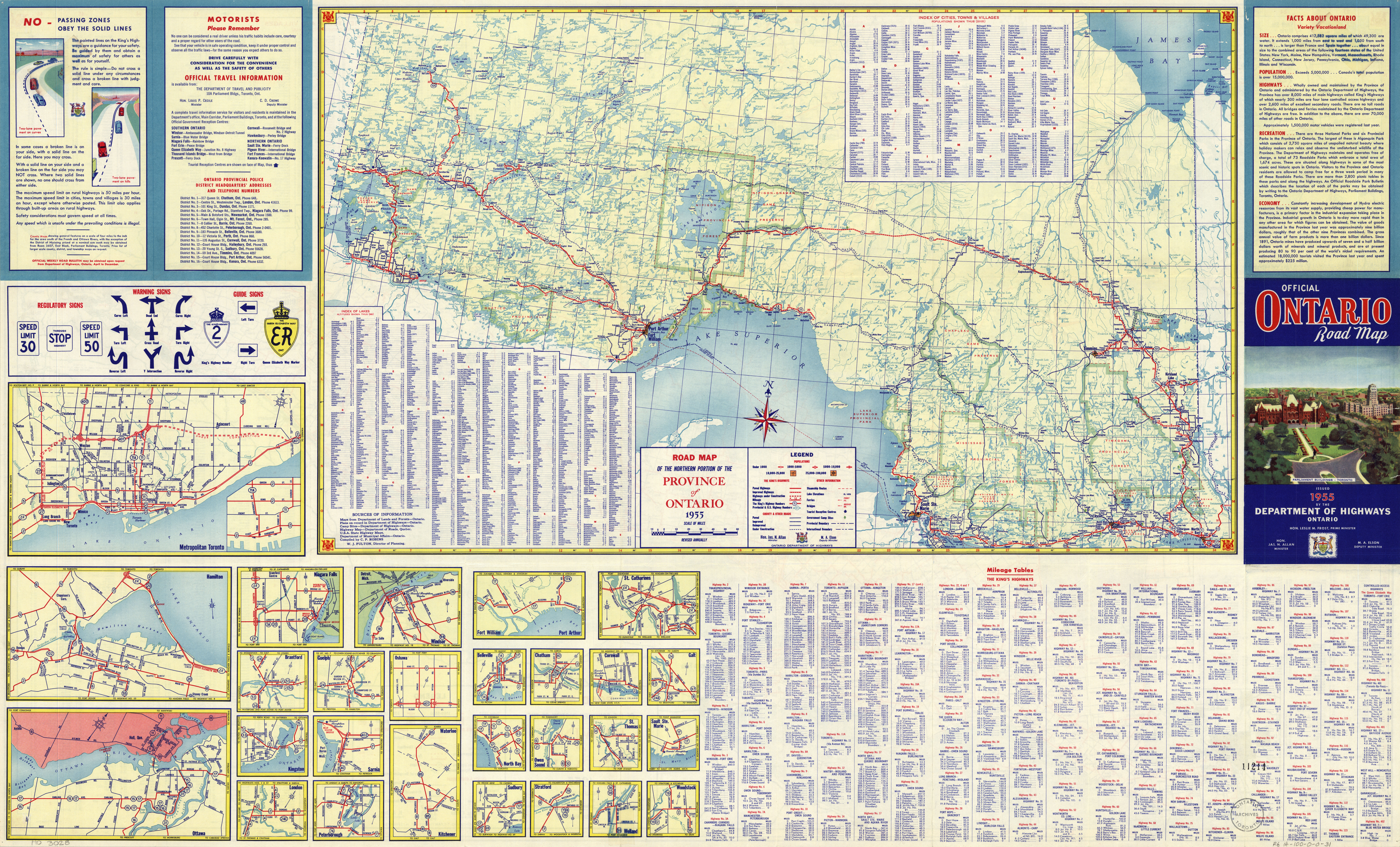
The original alignment of Highway 2 through Downtown Toronto

Prior to the construction of the Gardiner and Lakeshore Boulevard, the original alignment of Highway 2 through Downtown Toronto split into three separate routes to disperse traffic through the core. The northernmost route ran along Queen Street until Kingston Road. Another route split from Queen from its western terminus at Roncesvalles Avenue and ran along the entire length of King Street until it rejoined Queen. The southernmost route consisted of streets which are now partially or wholly absorbed into Lake Shore: Fleet, Cherry, and Keating Streets; as well as short sections of Leslie Street and Eastern Avenue until meeting with the Queen Street route at Kingston Road. All three routes rejoined at and followed Kingston Road along the newest pre-1998 alignment., although after the construction of Lake Shore, the aforementioned later branches along Coxwell and Woodbine Avenues were created.

After crossing the Highland Creek valley, Highway 2 and Kingston Road followed an off-ramp at the Highland Creek Overpass since the main road defaulted to Highway 2A, travelling parallel to and north of Highway 2A (the latter route being a short freeway connecting directly Highway 401). Highway 2 continued along Kingston Road as it passed under Highway 401 and then crossed the Rouge River into Pickering and Durham Region, initially alongside Highway 401 before departing farther north. It bisected Pickering Village and passed through Ajax. Entering Whitby—where it intersected Highway 12 at Brock Street—Kingston Road became Dundas Street, while in Oshawa it became King Street. Highway 2 then split into a one-way pairing within the latter, with westbound traffic following the adjacent Bond Street. It continued eastward through Courtice, Bowmanville and Newcastle as it drifted closer to Highway 401 and Lake Ontario; an interchange with Highway 35/115 was encountered immediately west of Newcastle.

Former Highway 2 facing southwest into downtown Trenton

After passing through Newtonville, Highway 2 entered Northumberland County, passing through the communities of Morrish and Welcome before turning southeast and crossing Highway 401 into Port Hope and intersecting the southern end of Highway 28. It continued near the shoreline of Lake Ontario through the town of Cobourg, where it intersected the southern end of Highway 45, as well as the communities of Grafton, Wicklow, Colborne and Salem. At the town of Brighton, where it intersected the southern end of Highway 30, the highway entered Hastings County and moved inland from Lake Ontario. In Trenton, the route crossed the Trent–Severn Waterway, intersected Highway 33, and began to travel along the northern shoreline of the Bay of Quinte.

Continuing northeast, Highway 2 passed south of CFB Trenton and through the community of Bayside before travelling through the city of Belleville, where it intersected both Highway 62 and Highway 37. After passing through the communities of Shannonville and Marysville, it turned south and bisected the Tyendinaga Mohawk Territory. Highway 2 turned east at an intersection with Highway 49 and travelled through Deseronto, after which it entered Lennox and Addington County. At Napanee, the highway met the southern terminus of Highway 41 then travelled through the communities of Morven, Odessa and Westbrook before entering Kingston.

Within Kingston, Highway 2 followed Princess Street and intersected Highway 38 and Highway 33, crossed the Cataraqui River and Rideau Canal on the La Salle Causeway, then intersected the southern end of Highway 15 near CFB Kingston. For the remainder of its length, the highway followed close to or along the northern shoreline of the St. Lawrence River. Travelling northeast from Kingston, Highway 2 passed through the communities of Barriefield, Ravensview and Pitts Ferry before reaching Gananoque and intersected the southern terminus of Highway 32. By 1997, the portion of Highway 2 between the interchanges at Exit 648 east of Gananoque and Exit 687 west of Brockville along Highway 401 was maintained by the United Counties of Leeds and Grenville, serving the communities of Wilstead, Mallorytown and Butternut Bay. The highway intersected Highway 29 at Brockville, then passed through the communities of Maitland, Prescott and Johnstown, intersecting the southern end of Highway 16 at the latter. It passed through Cardinal, as well as the Lost Villages relocated towns of Iroquois, Morrisburg—where it intersected Highway 31—Ingleside and Long Sault before entering Cornwall. It met the southern terminus of Highway 138 and continued northeast through the communities of Glen Walter and Summerstown. At Lancaster—the final notable community along Highway 2—the route met Highway 34, and shortly thereafter crossed into Quebec.

=== Current routes ===
Despite being decommissioned as a provincial highway in the 1990s, almost the entirety of the former highway remains driveable, and is now maintained by the various counties, regions, and cities through which it passes. The various sections have the following designations, from west to east:

| Location | Name | Notes |
|---|---|---|
| Windsor | E. C. Row Expressway | Dougall Avenue to Banwell Road |
| Essex County | Essex County Road 22, Essex County Road 42 | |
| Chatham-Kent | Chatham-Kent Road 2 | A 6.1 km (3.8 mi) of the route follows the extant Highway 40 |
| Middlesex County | Middlesex County Road 2, Longwoods Road, Dundas Street | |
| London | Longwoods Road, Main Street, Wharncliffe Road, Stanley Street, York Street, Florence Street, Dundas Street | |
| Oxford County | Oxford Road 2 | |
| County of Brant | Brant County Highway 2 | |
| Brantford | Paris Road, Brant Road, Colborne Street East | |
| Hamilton | Wilson Street, Main Street, Paradise Road, King Street, Dundurn Street, York Boulevard | One-way pairing; eastbound traffic follows Main Street and Dundurn Street, westbound traffic follows King Street and Paradise Road |
| Halton Region | Plains Road, King Road, North Shore Boulevard, Lakeshore Road | |
| Peel Region (Mississauga) | Southdown Road, Lakeshore Road | |
| Toronto | Lake Shore Boulevard, Gardiner Expressway, Lake Shore Boulevard, Woodbine Avenue, Kingston Road | 1950s maps pre-Gardiner Expressway show King Street and Queen Street as parallel alternate routes |
| Durham Region | Durham Regional Highway 2 | Kingston Road within Pickering and Ajax, Dundas Street within Whitby, King Street/Bond Street (one-way pair) within Oshawa, King Street within Bowmanville |
| Northumberland County | Northumberland County Road 2 | |
| Hastings County | Hastings County Road 2 | |
| Quinte West | Quinte West Municipal Road 2, Dundas Street | |
| Belleville | Old Highway 2, Dundas Street | A 1.0 km (0.62 mi) section follows the extant Highway 62 over the Moira River |
| Lennox and Addington County | Lennox and Addington County Road 2 | County Rd 2 West, also known as "Highway 2 West" |
| Kingston | Kingston Road 2 | Princess Street, Queen Street, La Salle Causeway, Ontario Street |
| United Counties of Leeds and Grenville | Leeds and Grenville County Road 2 | Excluding section from Gananoque east to Highway 401, which remains Highway 2 |
| Cornwall | Vincent Massey Drive, Brookdale Avenue, Ninth Street West, Marleau Avenue, Boundary Road, Montreal Road | |
| United Counties of Stormont, Dundas and Glengarry | Stormont, Dundas and Glengarry County Road 2 | Continues into Quebec as Quebec Route 338 towards Montreal |

== History ==
Highway 2 was the first roadway assumed under the maintenance of the Department of Public Highways (today's Ministry of Transportation of Ontario). The 73.5-kilometre (45.7 mi) section from the Rouge River to Smith's Creek, now Port Hope, was inaugurated on August 21, 1917, as The Provincial Highway. On June 7, 1918, the designation was extended east approximately 379 kilometres (235 mi) to the Quebec border.

=== Footpaths ===
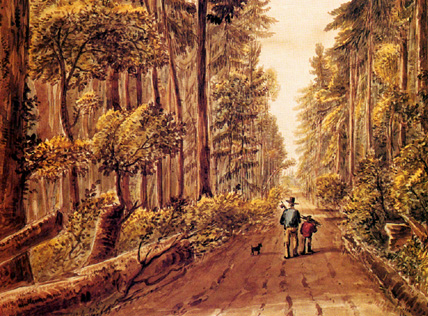
A painting of Kingston Road east of Toronto in the 1830s.

The forerunners to Highway 2 are numerous paths constructed during the colonization of Ontario. While some portions may have existed as trails created by Indigenous peoples for hundreds of years, the first recorded construction along what would become Highway 2 was in late October 1793, when Captain Smith and 100 Queen's Rangers returned from carving The Governor's Road 20 miles (32 km) through the thick forests between Dundas and the present location of Paris. John Graves Simcoe was given the task of defending Upper Canada (present day Ontario) from the United States following the American Revolution and with opening the territory to settlement. After establishing a "temporary" capital at York (present day Toronto), Simcoe ordered an inland route constructed between Cootes Paradise at the tip of Lake Ontario and his proposed capital of London. By the spring of 1794, the road was extended as far as La Tranche, now the Thames River, in London. In 1795, the path was connected with York. Asa Danforth Jr., recently immigrated from the United States, was awarded the task, for which he would be compensated $90 per mile.

Beginning on June 5, 1799, the road was extended eastwards. Danforth was hired once more, and tasked with clearing a 10-metre (33 ft) road east from York through the bush, with 5 metres (16 ft) (preferably in the centre) cut to the ground. It was carved as far as Port Hope by December, and to the Trent River soon after. Danforth's inspector and acting surveyor general William Chewett declared the road "good" for use in the dead of winter, but "impassible" during the wet summers, when the path turned to a bottomless mud pit. He went on to suggest that rather than setting aside land for government officials which would never be occupied, the land be divided into 200 acres (81 ha) lots for settlers who could then be tasked with statute labour to maintain the path. Danforth agreed, but the province insisted otherwise and only four settlers took up residence along the road between Toronto and Port Hope; like many other paths of the day, it became a quagmire.

Kingston Road at the Rouge River, c. 1909

Danforth's road did not always follow the same path as today's Kingston Road. Beginning near Victoria Park Avenue and Queen Street East, the road can be traced along Clonmore Drive, Danforth Road, Painted Post Drive, Military Trail and Colonel Danforth Trail. Other sections of the former roadway exist near Port Hope and Cobourg, as well as within Grafton. Otherwise the two roads more or less overlap until they reach the Trent River; beyond this point Danforth's road is continued (1802) on a more southern route to reach the Bay of Quinte at Stone Mills (now Glenora). As the route straying through Scarborough avoided many of the settlers who had taken up residence near the lake, Danforth's road was bypassed by 1814 by William Cornell and Levi Annis. The Cornell Road (as it was known for a short time) shortened the journey from Victoria Park to West Hill, but remained mostly impassible like Danforth's route to the north. Finally succumbing to increasing pressures, the government raised funds to straighten the road and extend it through Belleville to Kingston. The work was completed by 1817 and the road renamed The Kingston Road.

Downriver from Kingston, roads built along the St. Lawrence for War of 1812 military use became a popular means to avoid rapids on the river by travelling overland.

Prescot, now called Fort Wellington, is important as being the chief stage between this port and Montreal, from which it is distant 130 miles, and between which coaches run every day, except Sundays. From the position of this place, however, as at the head of the Montreal boat-navigation, and at the foot of the sloop and steam navigation from the lakes, it must soon increase in extent, as it will rise in importance.

— George Henry Hume, 1832

=== Stagecoach and mail road ===
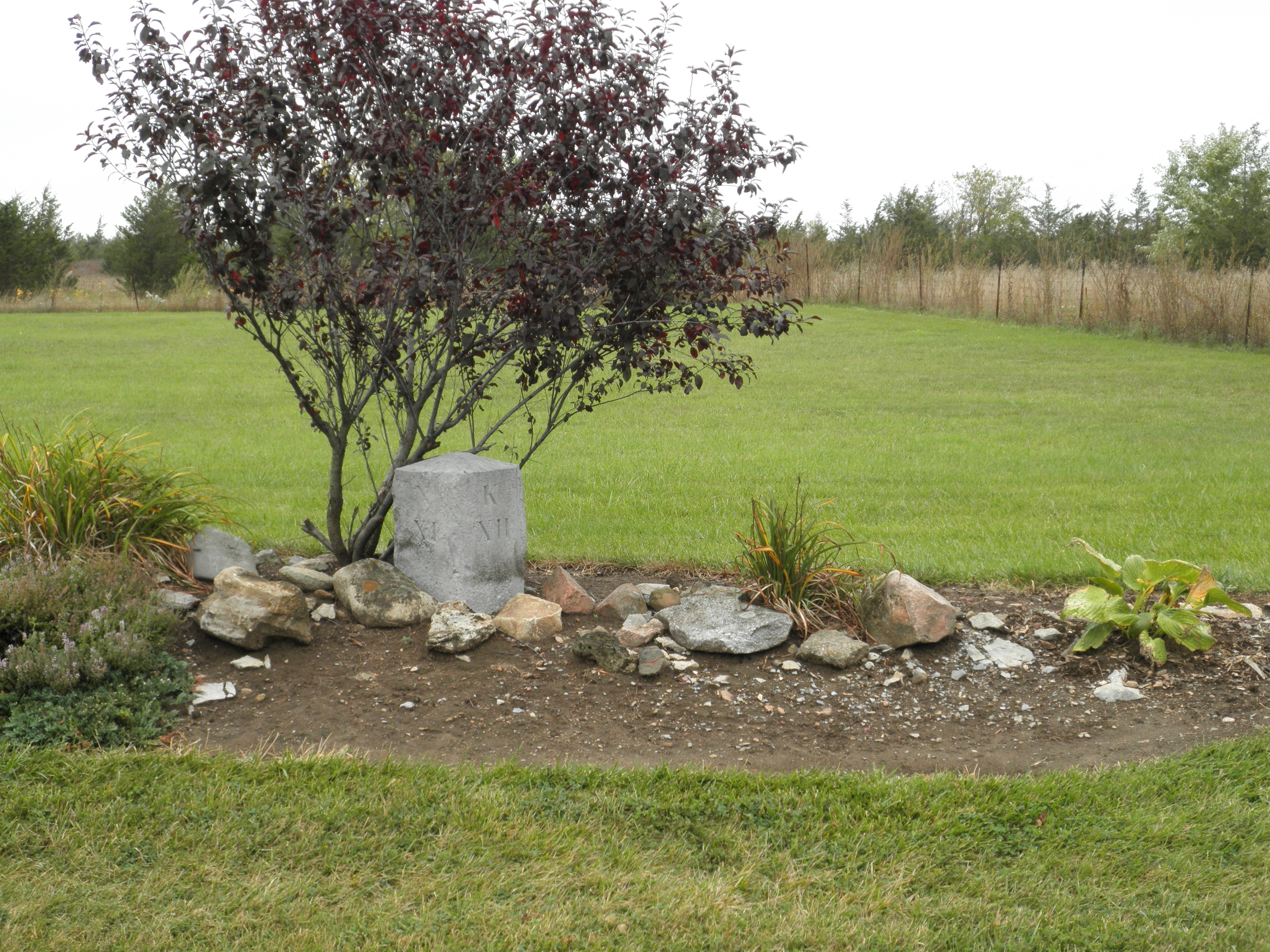
1839 milestone near Odessa

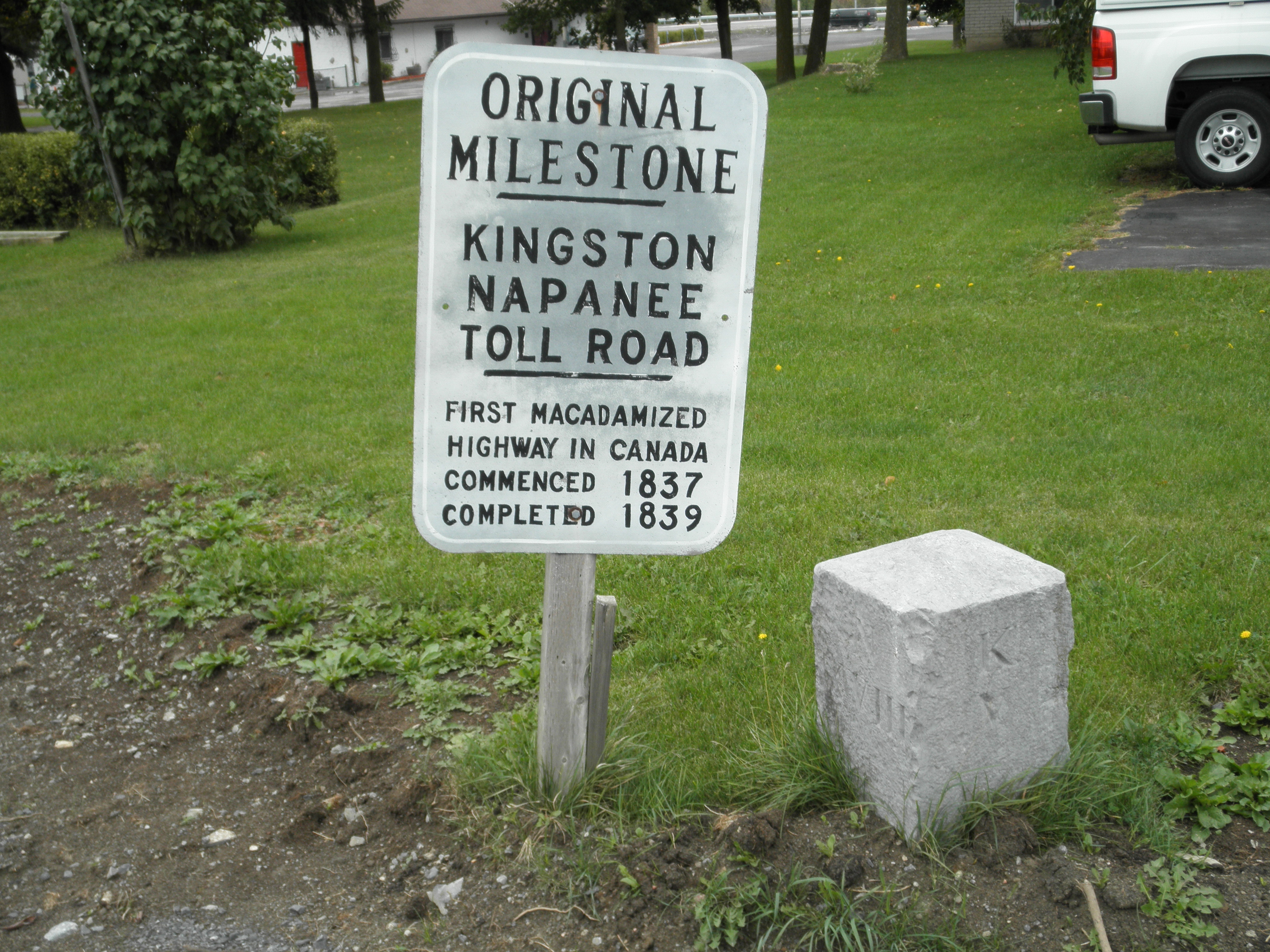
Original milestone marker in Kingston

The creation of a post road extended year-round communication which had already existed on the Chemin du Roy from Quebec City-Montreal westward, with the first stagecoaches reaching York (Toronto) in January 1817. This link proved economically vital to enterprises such as the Bank of Montreal, established 1817 with branches in Quebec, Montreal, Kingston and Toronto. The original coaches left Montreal every Monday and Thursday, arriving in Kingston two days later; the full Montreal-York run took a week.

As with earlier routes (such as the Danforth Road), coaching inns prospered in every wayside village as the stagecoaches made frequent stops for water, food or fresh horses.

The original York Road (from Kingston) a.k.a. Kingston Road (from York) was initially little more than a muddy horse path. In 1829, a ferry crossing on the Cataraqui River in Kingston was replaced by a draw bridge. In the 1830s, efforts were made by various toll road operators to macadamise the trail as a gravel stagecoach road. On one section between Cobourg and Port Hope the Cobourg Star on October 11, 1848, expressed "surprise and deep regret, that the Cobourg and Port Hope Road Company have placed a tollgate on their road, although only just gravelled" adding a week later "On Sunday night last, the Toll House and Gate on the Port Hope Road were burned to the ground. We regret to say that there is no doubt as to its having been done designedly as a very hard feeling has grown up against the Company, from their having exacted Toll before the road was properly packed. They might have known that no community would quietly submit to drive their teams and heavy loads through six inches of gravel and pay for the privilege. But we would not be understood to sanction the lawless proceeding which has taken place."

Despite these issues, this road would remain the principal means of winter travel until the Grand Trunk Railway connected Montreal and Toronto in 1856. As intercity traffic formerly carried by the various stagecoach operators migrated to the iron horse, stagecoach roads faded to primarily local importance, carrying regional traffic.

This changed as the 20th century and the invention of the motorcar quickly made evident a need for better roads in the young but growing Dominion. The macadamised Lake Shore Road between Toronto and Hamilton, in poor condition with ongoing erosion, was the first section to be upgraded with concrete. The Toronto–Hamilton Highway, proposed in 1914, was opened along the lakeshore in November 1917. The Cataraqui Bridge, a toll swing bridge, was replaced by the La Salle Causeway that same year.

In 1918, the province subsidised the county and municipal purchase of various former toll roads (Brockville-Prescott, Paris-Brantford, Cobourg-Port Hope and Cobourg-Baltimore) to be improved and incorporated into the provincial highway system. Later acquisitions included a road from Cobourg to Grafton. As the roads became publicly owned, toll gates were removed.

In 1925, the Galipeault Bridge and Taschereau Bridge, both adjacent to 1854 Grand Trunk Railway bridges which were the first fixed mainland links to Montreal, brought Route 2 onto Montreal Island.

=== Provincial highway ===
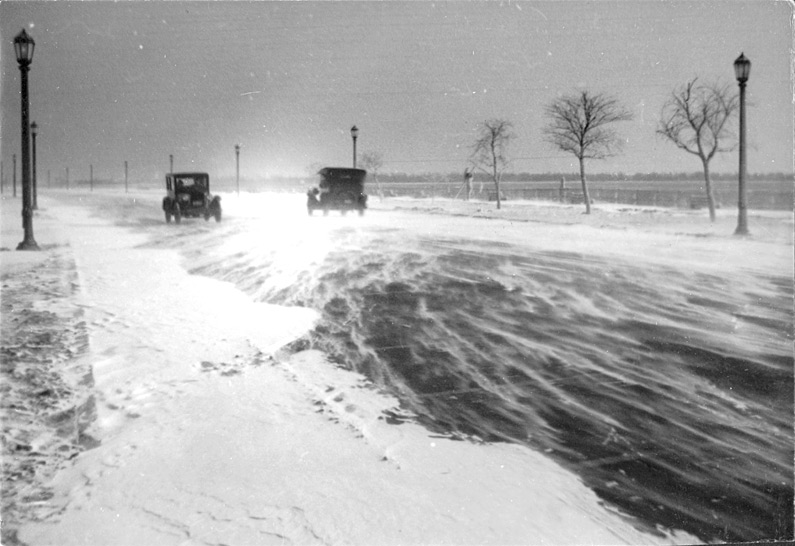
Lake Shore Boulevard, winter 1925

Ontario has published an official highway map since at least 1923, an era when many provincial highways were still gravel or unimproved road. To accommodate the passenger cars of the Roaring Twenties, efforts to pave Ontario's roads had begun in earnest. The 1926 Official Road Map of Ontario boasted the "Highway from Windsor to the Quebec border, via London will all be paved at the end of the present year" and "a person will then be able to travel over 700 miles of pavement without a detour". Twenty-five years after the first provincial road improvement efforts, Ontario maps boastfully listed fifteen king's highways (numbered 2–17, as 1 and 13 were never assigned) and a growing network of county roads. While thousands of miles of dirt and gravel road still remained throughout the system, the steel rails which crossed the region now had a credible rival in southern Ontario.

Beginning in 1935, Highway Minister Thomas McQuesten applied the concept of a second roadway to several projects along Highway 2: a 4 mi (6.4 km) stretch west of Brockville, a 4.5 km (2.8 mi) stretch from Woodstock eastward, and a section between Birchmount Road to east of Morningside Avenue in Scarborough Township. When widening in Scarborough reached the Highland Creek ravine in 1936, east of Morningside, the Department of Highways began construction on a second bridge over the large valley (the original having been constructed as a bypass of the former alignment through West Hill in 1919). From here the highway was constructed on a new alignment to Oshawa, avoiding construction on the congested Highway 2. As grading and bridge construction neared completion between Highland Creek and Ritson Road in September 1939, World War II broke out and gradually money was siphoned from highway construction to the war effort.

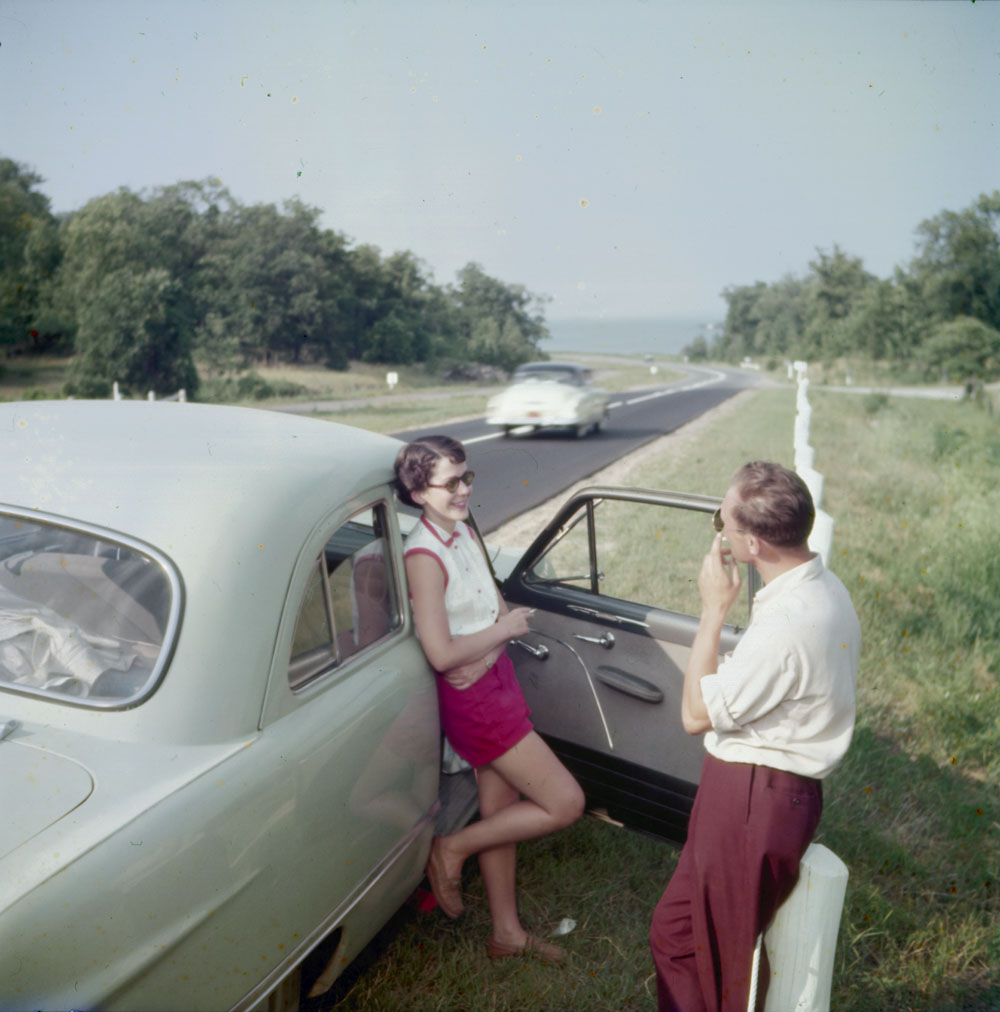
Highway 2 near Brockville, 1952

The wartime rationing of the 1940s soon gave way to the fifties neon era of growing prosperity, increased vehicle ownership and annual paid vacations. Service stations, diners, motels and tourist-related establishments were proliferating on long strips of highway such as Toronto's Lakeshore Boulevard and Kingston Road to accommodate the growing number of travellers.

Increased traffic initially led to a construction boom, but soon the most congested sections were among the first candidates to be bypassed by freeway. By 1955, businesspeople along the north shore of Lake Erie were organising efforts to promote tourism on Highways 2 and 3, both of which stood to lose traffic upon the construction of Highway 401. In 1956, the 401 provided a continuous Toronto Bypass from Weston to Oshawa.

A portion of the highway in the area of Morrisburg was permanently submerged by the creation of the St. Lawrence Seaway in 1958. The highway was rebuilt along a Canadian National Railway right-of-way in the area to bypass the flooded region. The town of Iroquois was also flooded, but was relocated 1.5 kilometres north rather than abandoned. This event led to the nickname of The Lost Villages for a number of communities in the area.

Countless roadside motels from Windsor to Montreal were bypassed in the 1960s, with the 401 freeway completed in 1968. Growing hotel chains built new facilities near the 401 offramps, saturating the market in some areas. By the 1980s, Toronto's portion of the Kingston Road was in steep decline. Some motels were used to shelter homeless or refugee populations, others were simply demolished.

Highway 2 being widened to four lanes through Oshawa, 1965

The section of Highway 2 between Woodstock and Ancaster (today a part of Hamilton) was not bypassed by 401 (which followed a more northerly corridor to serve Kitchener-Waterloo and Guelph), but was ultimately bypassed by Highway 403. As the main street in many communities Highway 2 remained busy with stop-and-go local traffic, sustaining countless shopkeepers and restaurateurs but offering little comfort to independent tourist motels. Outside urban areas, numerous former service stations were converted to other uses, demolished or abandoned.

The last section from Ancaster to Brantford, was bypassed on August 15, 1997. On January 1, 1998, most of the former length of Highway 2 was downloaded, transferring the highway from provincial responsibility to local counties or municipalities. The route lost its King's Highway designation in the process, along with much of its visibility on printed Ontario maps. Many Ontario highways which originally ended at Highway 2 (as the backbone of Ontario's highway system) were truncated or simply decommissioned, most often becoming county roads.

One token provincially maintained section of Highway 2 remains east of Gananoque; this section remains provincially maintained because the Thousand Islands Parkway does not have a complete interchange with Highway 401, meaning that some drivers must use the Highway 2 interchange to transfer between the two roads.

== Major intersections ==
The following table lists the major junctions along Highway 2. Based on the c. 1998 routing but using present-day roadway designations. While the route remains drivable for its entire length, officially only a 1.1 km (0.7 mi) stub currently remains under provincial control.

| Division | Location | km | mi | Destinations | Notes |
|---|---|---|---|---|---|
| Windsor | | 0.0 | 0.0 | E. C. Row Expressway Highway 3 (Huron Church Road) | Former Highway 2 western terminus; Highway 2 follows E. C. Row Expressway east; formerly Highway 18 south |
| Windsor | | See E. C. Row Expressway § Exit list | | | |
| Windsor | | 12.7 | 7.9 | County Road 43 south (Banwell Road) County Road 22 begins | E. C. Row Expressway eastern terminus; Essex County Road 22 western terminus |
| Essex | Lakeshore | 32.8 | 20.4 | County Road 42 west | Essex County Road 22 eastern terminus; former Highway 2 follows Essex County Road 42 east |
| Essex | Lakeshore | 51.6 | 32.1 | Highway 401 – Windsor, London | Highway 401 exit 56 |
| Essex–Chatham-Kent boundary | Lakeshore | 52.3 | 32.5 | Essex County Road 42 ends Chatham-Kent Municipal Road 2 begins | |
| Chatham-Kent | Tilbury | 53.7 | 33.4 | Municipal Road 1 (Queen Street) | |
| Chatham-Kent | | 58.8 | 36.5 | Highway 401 – Windsor, London | Highway 401 exit 63 |
| Chatham-Kent | Chatham | 80.9 | 50.3 | Highway 40 north (St. Clair Street) | Former western end of Highway 40 concurrency |
| Chatham-Kent | Chatham | 84.6 | 52.6 | Highway 40 south (Communication Road); Municipal Road 30 north (Prince Albert Road) | Former eastern end of Highway 40 concurrency |
| Chatham-Kent | Thamesville | 105.6 | 65.6 | Municipal Road 21 (Victoria Road) | Formerly Highway 21 |
| Chatham-Kent | Bothwell | 116.2 | 72.2 | Municipal Road 16 north (West Bothwell Road) | Formerly Highway 79 north |
| Chatham-Kent–Middlesex boundary | Southwest Middlesex | 120.0 | 74.6 | Chatham-Kent Municipal Road 2 ends Middlesex County Road 2 begins Chatham-Kent Municipal Road 121 / Middlesex County Road 14 (Clachan Road) | |
| Middlesex | Southwest Middlesex | 133.4 | 82.9 | County Road 76 south (Graham Road) | Woodgreen; formerly Highway 76 south |
| Middlesex | Southwest Middlesex | 138.3 | 85.9 | County Road 80 west – Glencoe | Strathburn; formerly Highway 80 west |
| Middlesex | Strathroy-Caradoc | 166.7 | 103.6 | Highway 402 – Sarnia, London | Highway 402 exit 86 |
| London | | 174.1 | 108.2 | County Road 2 breaks | London city limits |
| London | | 178.4 | 110.9 | Colonel Talbot Road | Formerly Highway 4 south; former western end of Highway 4 concurrency |
| London | | 180.5 | 112.2 | Bostwick Road / Exeter Road | Formerly Highway 135 east |
| London | | 180.9 | 112.4 | Highway 4 (Wonderland Road) | Present-day Highway 4 alignment; former Highway 2 continues on Wharncliffe Road |
| London | | 187.6 | 116.6 | Wharncliffe Road / Stanley Street | Formerly Highway 4 north; former eastern end of Highway 4 concurrency; former Highway 2 follows Stanley Street and York Street |
| London | | 194.7– 195.0 | 121.0– 121.2 | Highbury Avenue; Dundas Street | Formerly Highway 126; former Highway 2 followed Highbury Avenue for 300 m (980 ft) to Dundas Street; western end of Dundas Street concurrency |
| London | | 197.3 | 122.6 | Veterans Memorial Parkway | Formerly Highway 100 south |
| Middlesex | Thames Centre | 199.8 | 124.1 | County Road 2 resumes | London city limits |
| Middlesex–Oxford boundary | Thames Centre–Zorra boundary | 207.7– 208.9 | 129.1– 129.8 | Middlesex County Road 2 ends Oxford County Road 2 begins | 1.2 km (0.75 mi) concurrency |
| Oxford | Zorra | 211.3– 211.5 | 131.3– 131.4 | County Road 119 (Allan Street / Milton Street) | Thamesford; formerly Highway 19; intersections offset and 200 m (660 ft) concurrency |
| Oxford | Woodstock | 231.9 | 144.1 | County Road 59 north (Vansittart Avenue) | Formerly Highway 59 north; former western end of Highway 59 concurrency |
| Oxford | Woodstock | 233.2 | 144.9 | County Road 54 north (Huron Street); County Road 59 south (Wilson Street) | Formerly Highway 59 south; former eastern end of Highway 59 concurrency |
| Oxford | Woodstock | 238.5 | 148.2 | Highway 401 – Toronto, London | Highway 401 exit 238 |
| Oxford | Woodstock | 239.7 | 148.9 | County Road 55 east | Formerly Highway 53 east |
| Oxford–Brant boundary | Blandford-Blenheim | 244.7– 258.3 | 152.0– 160.5 | Oxford County Road 2 ends Brant County Highway 2 begins | 14.1 km (8.8 mi) concurrency |
| Brant | Paris | 263.6 | 163.8 | County Highway 24 south (Rest Acres Road) | To Highway 24 south |
| Brant | Paris | 264.6 | 164.4 | County Highway 24A north (Dumfries Street) | Formerly Highway 24A north |
| Brant | Paris | 266.3 | 165.5 | County Road 55 north (Green Lane) County Highway 5 east (Governors Road East) | Formerly Highway 5 east; eastern end of Dundas Street concurrency |
| Brantford | | 269.0 | 167.1 | County Highway 2 breaks | Brantford city limits |
| Brantford | | 271.9 | 169.0 | Highway 403 – Hamilton, London | Highway 403 exit 33; present-day Highway 403 / Highway 24 concurrency; no eastbound access to Highway 403 west |
| Brantford | | 274.8 | 170.8 | St. Paul Avenue | Formerly Highway 24 north; former western end of Highway 24 concurrency |
| Brantford | | 276.3 | 171.7 | Colborne Street W | Formerly Highway 24 west / Highway 53 south; former eastern end of Highway 24 concurrency; former western end of Highway 53 concurrency; to County Highway 53 west |
| Brant | Cainsville | 282.8 | 175.7 | County Road 18 County Highway 2 / County Highway 53 resumes | Brantford city limits; formerly Highway 54 east; western end of County Highway 2 / County Highway 53 concurrency |
| Hamilton | | 290.8 | 180.7 | Brant County Highway 2 / Brant County Highway 53 ends | Hamilton city limits; former Highway 2 / Highway 53 follows Wilson Street and Main Street |
| Hamilton | | 296.1 | 184.0 | City Road 52 | Formerly Highway 52 north |
| Hamilton | | 297.6 | 184.9 | Garner Road West | Formerly Highway 53 east; former eastern end of Highway 53 concurrency |
| Hamilton | | 299.5 | 186.1 | Highway 403 – Toronto, Brantford | Highway 403 exit 58 |
| Hamilton | | 330.2 | 205.2 | City Road 8 west (Cootes Drive) | Formerly Highway 8 west; former western end of Highway 8 concurrency; former Highway 2 follows present-day City Road 8 east |
| Hamilton | | 299.5 | 186.1 | Highway 403 – Toronto, Brantford | Highway 403 exits 69 & 70; one-way transition where eastbound follows Main Street and westbound follows King Street; present-day Highway 403 / Highway 6 concurrency |
| Hamilton | | 335.6 | 208.5 | City Road 8 east (Main Street W) / Dundurn Street | Formerly Highway 8 east / Highway 6 south; former eastern end of Highway 8 concurrency; former western end of Highway 6 concurrency; former Highway 2 follows Dundurn Street |
| Hamilton | | 336.6 | 209.2 | York Boulevard | Former Highway 2 follows York Boulevard |
| Hamilton | | 337.0 | 209.4 | Thomas B. McQuesten High Level Bridge crosses Desjardins Canal | |
| Hamilton | | 338.3 | 210.2 | Highway 403 east – Toronto | Eastbound exit and westbound entrance; westbound exit and eastbound entrance from Highway 403; Highway 403 exit 73 |
| Halton | Burlington | 339.6 | 211.0 | Plains Road W | Formerly Highway 6 north; former eastern end of Highway 6 concurrency; former Highway 2 follows Plains Road W |
| Halton | Burlington | 345.7 | 214.8 | Plains Road W / King Road | Former Highway 2 follows King Road and North Shore Boulevard |
| Halton | Burlington | 348.2 | 216.4 | Queen Elizabeth Way – Toronto, Niagara | Queen Elizabeth Way exit 97; former Highway 2 continues on Lakeshore Road |
| Halton | Oakville | 359.7 | 223.5 | Bronte Road | Formerly Highway 25 north; to Regional Road 25 north |
| Peel | Mississauga | 382.3 | 237.6 | Hurontario Street | Formerly Highway 10 north |
| Toronto | | 387.5– 387.8 | 240.8– 241.0 | Brown's Line to Highway 427 north | |
| Toronto | | 396.5 | 246.4 | Gardiner Expressway | Gardiner Expressway exit 145; former Queen Elizabeth Way Toronto terminus; former Highway 2 followed Gardiner Expressway |
| Toronto | | See Gardiner Expressway § Exit list (exits 145-157) | | | |
| Toronto | | 408.0 | 253.5 | Don Valley Parkway Lake Shore Boulevard | Gardiner Expressway eastern terminus; former Highway 2 follows Lake Shore Boulevard and Woodbine Avenue; ramps to Lake Shore Boulevard closed August 31, 2021 |
| Toronto | | 412.8 | 256.5 | Woodbine Avenue / Kingston Road | Former Highway 2 follows Kingston Road |
| Toronto | | 418.6 | 260.1 | Danforth Avenue | Westbound exit and eastbound entrance; formerly Highway 5 west |
| Toronto | | 430.3 | 267.4 | Highway 2A east to Highway 401 east / Lawson Road | |
| Toronto | | 432.3 | 268.6 | Highway 401 west | Highway 401 exit 390; eastbound exit and westbound entrance from Highway 401 |
| Toronto–Durham boundary | Toronto–Pickering boundary | 434.2 | 269.8 | Durham Regional Highway 2 begins | |
| Durham | Pickering | 439.1 | 272.8 | Regional Road 29 (Liverpool Road) | |
| Durham | Ajax | 445.2 | 276.6 | Regional Road 44 (Harwood Avenue) | |
| Durham | Whitby | 449.3 | 279.2 | Highway 412 north | Highway 412 exit 1; southbound exit and northbound entrance from Highway 412; constructed after Highway 2 was downloaded |
| Durham | Whitby | 450.1 | 279.7 | Regional Highway 2 breaks Fothergill Court | |
| Durham | Whitby | 452.2 | 281.0 | Brock Street | Formerly Highway 12; to Regional Highway 12 north |
| Durham | Oshawa | 458.6– 458.8 | 285.0– 285.1 | Regional Road 2A south (Centre Street); Regional Road 2 north (Simcoe Street) | One-way pair |
| Durham | Oshawa–Clarington boundary | 463.0 | 287.7 | Regional Highway 2 resumes Regional Road 55 (Townline Road) | |
| Durham | Clarington | 467.1 | 290.2 | Highway 418 | Highway 418 exit 3; constructed after Highway 2 was downloaded |
| Durham | Clarington | 472.2 | 293.4 | Regional Road 57 (Bowmanville Avenue) | Bowmanville |
| Durham | Clarington | 479.3 | 297.8 | Highway 35 / Highway 115 – Lindsay, Peterborough | Newcastle |
| Durham–Northumberland boundary | Clarington–Port Hope boundary | 493.0 | 306.3 | Durham Regional Highway 2 ends Northumberland County Road 2 begins | |
| Northumberland | Port Hope | 503.6 | 312.9 | Highway 401 – Kingston, Toronto | Highway 401 exit 461 |
| Northumberland | Port Hope | 507.6 | 315.4 | County Road 28 north (Mill Street) | Formerly Highway 28 north |
| Northumberland | Cobourg | 519.1 | 322.6 | County Road 45 north (Division Street) | Formerly Highway 45 north |
| Northumberland | Brighton | 555.9 | 345.4 | County Road 30 north (Young Street) | Formerly Highway 30 north |
| Northumberland–Quinte West boundary | Brighton–Quinte West boundary | 561.5 | 348.9 | Northumberland County Road 2 ends Quinte West Municipal Road 2 begins | |
| Quinte West | | 570.1 | 354.2 | Municipal Road 33 south (Dufferin Avenue) | Formerly Highway 33 south; former western end of Highway 33 concurrency |
| Quinte West | | 570.6 | 354.6 | Municipal Road 33 north (Division Street) | Formerly Highway 33 north; former eastern end of Highway 33 concurrency |
| Quinte West–Belleville boundary | | 583.8 | 362.8 | Quinte West Municipal Road 2 ends Wallbridge Loyalist Road | |
| Belleville | | 587.3 | 364.9 | Highway 62 south (Baybridge Road) | Former western end of Highway 62 concurrency |
| Belleville | | 588.3 | 365.6 | Highway 62 north (Pinnacle Street) | Former eastern end of Highway 62 concurrency |
| Belleville–Tyendinaga Mohawk Territory boundary | | 599.1 | 372.3 | Hastings County Road 2 begins | Hasting County Road 2 western terminus |
| Hastings | Tyendinaga | 612.0 | 380.3 | County Road 15 north (Marysville Road) County Road 24 east (Belleville Road) | Marysville; formerly Highway 49 north north; former western end of Highway 49 concurrency |
| Tyendinaga Mohawk Territory | | 613.1 | 381.0 | Highway 49 begins County Road 2 breaks | Territorial boundary; Highway 49 northern terminus |
| Tyendinaga Mohawk Territory | | 616.2 | 382.9 | County Road 2 resumes Highway 49 south – Picton | Former eastern end of Highway 49 concurrency |
| Hastings–Lennox and Addington boundary | Deseronto–Greater Napanee boundary | 620.6 | 385.6 | Hastings County Road 2 ends Lennox and Addington County Road 2 begins County Road 10 north (Deseronto Road) | |
| Lennox and Addington | Greater Napanee | 630.0 | 391.5 | County Road 41 north / County Road 8 south (Centre Street) | Formerly Highway 41 north |
| Lennox and Addington | Loyalist | 645.1 | 400.8 | County Road 4 | Formerly Highway 133 |
| Kingston | | 655.0 | 407.0 | Lennox and Addington County Road 2 ends Kingston Road 2 begins | Kingston city limits |
| Kingston | | 662.1 | 411.4 | Road 38 north (Gardiners Road) | Formerly Highway 38 north |
| Kingston | | 667.3 | 414.6 | Road 33 (Bath Road) | Formerly Highway 33 west |
| Kingston | | 670.8 | 416.8 | La Salle Causeway crosses Cataraqui River | |
| Kingston | | 672.2 | 417.7 | Road 15 north | Formerly Highway 15 north |
| Leeds and Grenville | Leeds and the Thousand Islands | 692.7 | 430.4 | Kingston Road 2 ends Leeds and Grenville County Road 2 begins | Kingston city limits |
| Gananoque | | 696.8 | 433.0 | County Road 2 breaks | Gananoque city limits |
| Gananoque | | 699.0 | 434.3 | Stone Street | Formerly Highway 32 north |
| Leeds and Grenville | Leeds and the Thousand Islands | 0.0 725.8 | 0.0 451.0 | Highway 2 begins | Gananoque city limits; present-day Highway 2 western terminus |
| Leeds and Grenville | Leeds and the Thousand Islands | 0.3 726.1 | 0.19 451.2 | Thousand Islands Parkway to Highway 401 west – Kingston | |
| Leeds and Grenville | Leeds and the Thousand Islands | 1.1 726.9 | 0.68 451.7 | Highway 2 ends County Road 2 resumes Highway 401 east – Cornwall | Westbound exit and eastbound exit from Highway 401; Highway 401 exit 648; present-day Highway 2 eastern terminus is at the offramp from westbound Highway 401; continues as Leeds and Grenville County Road 2 |
| Leeds and Grenville | Elizabethtown-Kitley | 764.5 | 475.0 | Highway 401 – Cornwall, Kingston | Highway 401 exit 687 |
| Brockville | | 774.0 | 480.9 | County Road 29 north (Courthouse Avenue) / Broad Street | Formerly Highway 29 north |
| Leeds and Grenville | Elizabethtown-Kitley | No major junctions | | | |
| Prescott | | 793.4 | 493.0 | County Road 18 north (Edward Street) | |
| Leeds and Grenville | Elizabethtown-Kitley | 798.9 | 496.4 | Highway 16 north to Highway 416 / NY 812 / NY 37 – Ottawa | Johnstown; to Ogdensburg-Prescott International Bridge |
| Leeds and Grenville–Stormont, Dundas and Glengarry boundary | Elizabethtown-Kitley–South Dundas boundary | 810.1 | 503.4 | Leeds and Grenville County Road 2 ends Stormont, Dundas and Glengarry County Road 2 begins | |
| Stormont, Dundas and Glengarry | South Dundas | 828.9 | 515.1 | County Road 31 north / Ottawa Street | Morrisburg; formerly Highway 31 north |
| Cornwall | | 861.6 | 535.4 | County Road 2 breaks | Cornwall city limits |
| Cornwall | | 868.1 | 539.4 | Highway 138 north (Brookdale Avenue) – Hawkesbury | Former western end of Highway 138 concurrency |
| Cornwall | | 868.5 | 539.7 | Highway 138 ends / Brookdale Avenue / 9th Street West | Highway 138 southern terminus; to Seaway International Bridge |
| Stormont, Dundas and Glengarry | South Glengarry | 876.8 | 544.8 | County Road 2 resumes | Cornwall city limits |
| Stormont, Dundas and Glengarry | South Glengarry | 897.5 | 557.7 | Highway 401 – Cornwall, Montreal County Road 34 north | Lancaster; Highway 401 exit 814; formerly Highway 34 north |
| Stormont, Dundas and Glengarry | South Glengarry | 908.9 | 564.8 | County Road 23 north | To Highway 401 (exit 825) |
| Stormont, Dundas and Glengarry | South Glengarry | 912.1 | 566.8 | R-338 east – Rivière-Beaudette, Vaudreuil-Dorion | Stormont, Dundas and Glengarry County Road 2 eastern terminus; continuation into Quebec; formerly Route 2 east |
1.000 mi = 1.609 km; 1.000 km = 0.621 mi: Closed/former; Incomplete access

== See also ==
- Heritage Highway

Interprovincial Highway 2
| Previous route Terminus | Highway 2 | Next route QC Route 2 |
