= Ontario Highway 138 =

Ontario provincial highway

Highway 138
- Highway 138 highlighted in red

Route information
- Maintained by the Ministry of Transportation
- Length: 38.7 km (24.0 mi)
- Existed: May 1, 1967–present

Major junctions
- South end: 9th Street West in Cornwall (formerly Highway 2 east)
- Highway 401 in Cornwall
- North end: Highway 417 / TCH near Casselman

Location
- Country: Canada
- Province: Ontario
- Counties: Stormont, Dundas and Glengarry United Counties
- Towns: Saint Andrews, Monkland

Highway system
- Ontario provincial highways; Current; Former; 400-series
← Highway 137	→ Highway 140

King's Highway 138, commonly referred to as Highway 138, is a provincially maintained highway in eastern Ontario, Canada. It extends from former Highway 2 in Cornwall, north to Highway 417 east of Casselman. Highway 138 provides access to the Seaway International Bridge, connecting Cornwall with Massena, New York. The highway is 38.7 km (24.0 mi) in length.

Highway 138 was first established in 1967, connecting Highway 2, now Vincent Massey Drive, with Highway 43 in Monkland. By the mid-1970s, the route had been extended north to meet with the newly opened Highway 417. Since then it has remained unchanged.

== Route description ==
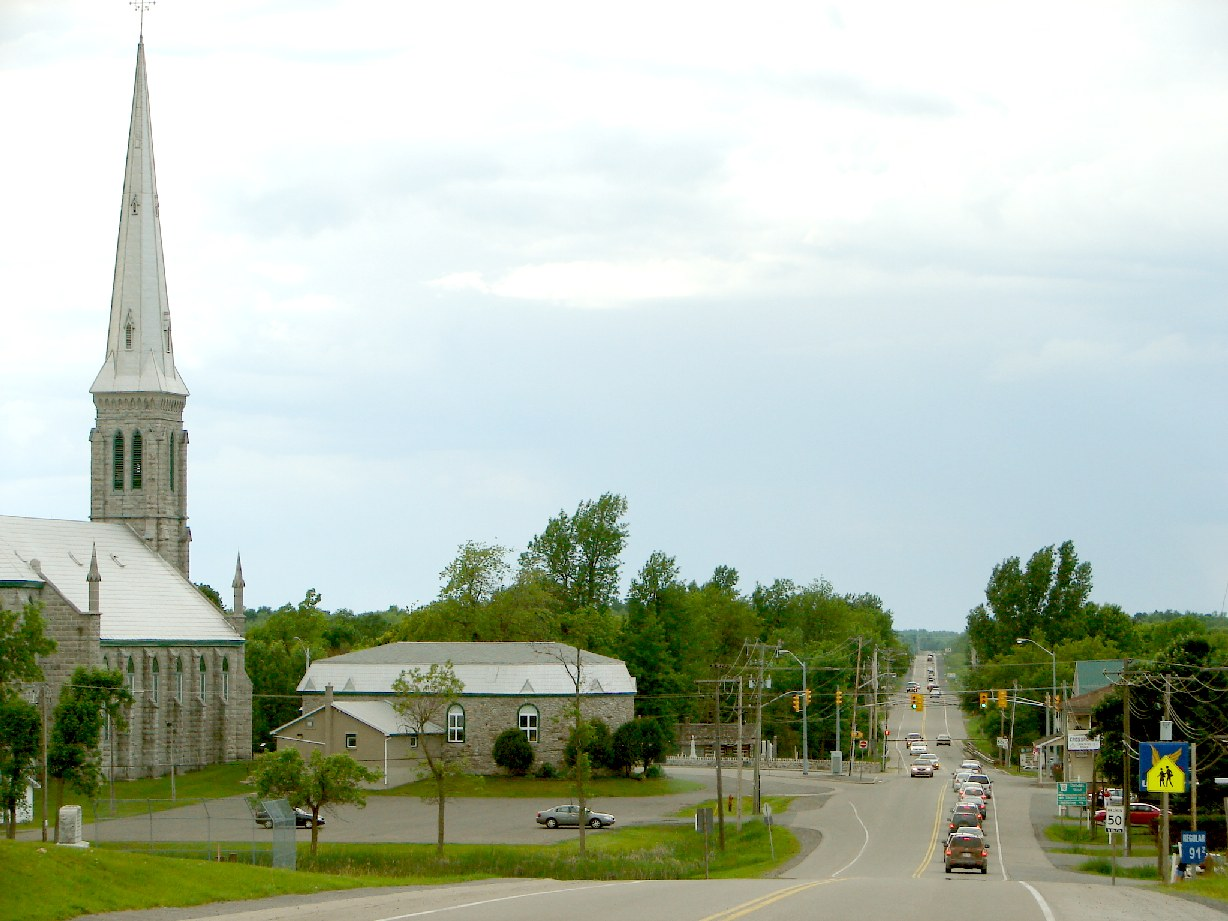
Highway 138 through St. Andrews West

Highway 138 is a 36.0-kilometre (22.4 mi) highway that crosses the Laurentian Valley in eastern Ontario, connecting Highway 401 in Cornwall with Highway 417 east of Casselman.

The route begins at 9th Street West, which was Highway 2 until the late 90s, and proceeds north along the western side of Cornwall; this section is maintained under a Connecting Link agreement and is locally known as Brookdale Avenue. After crossing Highway 401, at which there is an interchange, the route encounters Cornwall Centre Road, onto which it turns east. After following it for a brief distance, the highway turns north onto St. Andrews Road; the Connecting Link agreement ends at this junction.

Over the next two kilometres (1.25 mi), the highway exits the fringes of Cornwall, passing through the neighbourhood of Churchill Heights. After passing Headline Road (County Road 44), the route divides a forest and then enters an agricultural area before coming upon the community of St. Andrews West. It crosses the Raisin River and continues north through a mix of farmland and forests.

Like other provincial routes in Ontario, Highway 138 is maintained by the Ministry of Transportation of Ontario. In 2010, traffic surveys conducted by the ministry showed that on average, 11,200 vehicles used the highway daily along the section between Cornwall Centre Road and Kings Road in Saint Andrews while 5,200 vehicles did so each day along the section between Stormont, Dundas and Glengarry County Roads 43 and 22, the highest and lowest counts along the highway, respectively.

== History ==
Highway 138 was established by the Department of Highways on May 1, 1967, following existing Stormont County roads between Highway 2 at the Seaway International Bridge and Highway 43. With the construction of Highway 417 planned and progressing eastward from Ottawa, Highway 138 was extended north to its present terminus east of Casselman in 1971 or 1972.

Budget constraints brought on by a recession in the 1990s resulted in the Mike Harris provincial government forming the Who Does What? committee to determine cost-cutting measures in order to balance the budget after a deficit incurred by former premier Bob Rae. It was determined that many Ontario highways no longer serve long-distance traffic movement and should therefore be maintained by local or regional levels of government. The MTO consequently transferred many highways to lower levels of government in 1997 and 1998, removing a significant percentage of the provincial highway network. On January 1, 1998, 1.7 kilometres (1.1 mi) of Highway 138 was transferred to the City of Cornwall. This section is now known as Brookdale Avenue.

== Major intersections ==
The following table lists the major junctions along Highway 138, as noted by the Ministry of Transportation of Ontario.

Division	Location	km	mi	Destinations	Notes
Mohawk Nation at Akwesasne	Kawehno:ke	−4.1	−2.5	To NY 37 – Malone, Massena	Continuation into New York (state)
Mohawk Nation at Akwesasne	Kawehno:ke	−4.1	−2.5	Canada–United States border	
Mohawk Nation at Akwesasne	Kawehno:ke	−4.1– −2.0	−2.5– −1.2	Seaway International Bridge crosses the St. Lawrence River via Cornwall Island	
Cornwall		0.0	0.0	9th Street West	Beginning of Cornwall Connecting Link agreement; formerly Highway 2 east; southern end of former Highway 2 concurrency
Cornwall		0.5	0.31	Vincent Massey Drive	Formerly Highway 2 west; northern end of former Highway 2 concurrency
Cornwall		2.7	1.7	Highway 401 – Kingston, Montreal	Highway 401 exit 789
Cornwall		4.3	2.7	Cornwall Centre Road	End of Connecting Link agreement
Stormont, Dundas and Glengarry	South Stormont	6.4	4.0	County Road 44 east / Headline Road	
Stormont, Dundas and Glengarry	South Stormont	8.9	5.5	County Road 18 (Kings Road)	St. Andrews
Stormont, Dundas and Glengarry	North Stormont	21.8	13.5	County Road 43 – Smiths Falls, Alexandria	Monkland; formerly Highway 43
Stormont, Dundas and Glengarry	North Stormont	30.6	19.0	County Road 22 east (McNeil Road) – Dyer	
Stormont, Dundas and Glengarry	North Stormont	32.1	19.9	County Road 15 west (McLean Road) – Moose Creek	
Stormont, Dundas and Glengarry–Prescott and Russell boundary	North Stormont–The Nation boundary	38.7	24.0	Highway 417 / TCH – Ottawa, Montreal	Highway 417 exit 58
1.000 mi = 1.609 km; 1.000 km = 0.621 mi: Closed/former
