= Ontario Highway 76 =

Former Ontario provincial highway

Highway 76

Route information
- Maintained by the Ministry of Transportation of Ontario
- Length: 18.0 km (11.2 mi)
- Existed: September 16, 1936–April 1, 1997

Major junctions
- South end: Highway 3 in Eagle
- North end: County Road 2 (Longwoods Road)

Location
- Country: Canada
- Province: Ontario

Highway system
- Ontario provincial highways; Current; Former; 400-series
← Highway 72	→ Highway 77
Former provincial highways
← Highway 75

King's Highway 76, commonly referred to as Highway 76, was a provincially maintained highway in the Canadian province of Ontario. The route began at Highway 3 in Eagle and progressed north through the community of West Lorne, encountering Highway 401 immediately before terminating southwest of Glencoe at Longwoods Road (then Highway 2). Today the route it followed is known as Elgin County Road 76 and Middlesex County Road 76.

Highway 76 was first designated in 1936, connecting West Lorne with Highway 3. It was extended northwest to Highway 2 in 1957 in anticipation of the construction of Highway 401 through the area, which took place in 1963. The route remained unchanged until 1997, when it was transferred to Elgin County and Middlesex County.

== Route description ==
Highway 76 began near the Lake Erie shoreline in Eagle, at Highway 3. From there it travelled northwest through a mixture of farmland and woodlots for 4.2 kilometres (2.6 mi) to the town of West Lorne, meeting. Immediately north of West Lorne before encountering an interchange with Highway 401 (Exit 137). About 8.6 kilometres (5.3 mi) north of Highway 401, Highway 76 crossed over the Thames River. Highway 76 ended 2.1 kilometres (1.3 mi) beyond the river at Longwoods Road (then Highway 2) midway between Wardsville and Strathburn as well as near the town of Glencoe.

South of the Thames River, Highway 76 was within Elgin County, while north of the river was within Middlesex County. Outside of Eagle and West Lorne, the former highway was entirely rural. Today it is known as Elgin County Road 76 and Middlesex County Road 76 in the respective county.

== History ==
Highway 76 was first assigned by the Department of Highways (DHO), predecessor to today's Ministry of Transportation, on September 16, 1936. It was initially 5.6 kilometres (3.5 mi) long, connecting Highway 3 with the village of West Lorne to the northwest along an existing gravel township road. The DHO quickly improved the route, fully paving it by 1938. Several highway routings were altered southwest of London in late 1957, in anticipation for the construction of Highway 401. On December 5, 1957, Highway 76 was extended 12.4 kilometres (7.7 mi) northwest to Highway 2 between Wardsville and Strathburn. Highway 401 would open between Tilbury and London as a two lane freeway on October 22, 1963 with an interchange at Highway 76. For nearly two years, traffic utilised the future westbound lanes until the eastbound lanes opened July 20, 1965.

Highway 76 remained unchanged for the next 30 years. As part of a series of budget cuts initiated by premier Mike Harris under his Common Sense Revolution platform in 1995, numerous highways deemed to no longer be of significance to the provincial network were decommissioned and responsibility for the routes transferred to a lower level of government, a process referred to as downloading. As Highway 76 generally served local traffic as opposed to long-distance movement, it was downloaded to Elgin County and Middlesex County effective April 1, 1997. The two counties each retained the number 76 for the route in their respective county road system.

== Major intersections ==
The following table lists the major junctions along Highway 76, as noted by the Ministry of Transportation of Ontario.

Division	Location	km	mi	Destinations	Notes
Elgin	Eagle	0.0	0.0	Highway 3	
Elgin	West Lorne	5.4	3.4	County Road 2	
Elgin	West Elgin	7.4	4.6	Highway 401	
Middlesex	Southwest Middlesex	18.0	11.2	Highway 2 (Longwoods Road)	Now Middlesex County Road 2
1.000 mi = 1.609 km; 1.000 km = 0.621 mi
