= List of numbered roads in Stormont, Dundas and Glengarry United Counties =

This is a list of numbered roads in the United Counties of Stormont, Dundas and Glengarry, Ontario.

| County Road # | Local name(s) | Southern/Western Terminus | Northern/Eastern Terminus | Settlements served | Additional Notes |
|---|---|---|---|---|---|
| 1 | Carman Road; Mountain Road; Reids Mills Road | Belmeade Road | Boat House Road | Iroquois, Haddo, Hainsville, Glen Stewart, Pleasant Valley, South Mountain, Mountain, Hallville, Reids Mills | |
| 2 | County Road 2 | Hallecks Road | Quebec border (continues as Quebec Route 338) | Iroquois, Morrisburg, Ingleside, Long Sault, Lakeview Heights, Glen Walter, Summerstown, South Lancaster | Formerly Highway 2; route interrupted by non-existence within Cornwall city limits |
| 3 | County Road 3 | Boundary Road | County Road 7 | South Mountain, Baldwins Bridge, Vinegar Hill, Inkerman Station, Winchester, The Ninth | |
| 4 | Lakeshore Drive | County Road 2 | County Road 31 | Morrisburg | |
| 5 | Oak Valley Road | County Road 16 | County Road 31 | Oak Valley, Winchester Springs | |
| 6 | County Road 6 | Finch-Cambridge Boundary Road | County Road 15 | none | minor rural route |
| 7 | County Road 7 Dunbar Road | County Road 31 | Marionville Road | Elma, Dunbar, Chesterville, The Ninth, Morewood | |
| 8 | Church Road | County Road 2 | County Road 7 | Orchardside, Hoasic, Froatburn | |
| 9 | Smith Road; Berwick Road | County Road 43 | County Road 15 | Chesterville, Berwick | |
| 10 | Glen Robertson Road | County Road 34 | Quebec border | Alexandria, Glen Robertson | |
| 11 | County Road 11 | County Road 18 | County Road 43 | Bush Glen, Grantley | |
| 12 | County Road 12 | County Road 2 | Finch Concession 10-11 Road | Lunenburg, Newington, Finch, Berwick, Crysler | shares roadway with County Road 14 on section extending southwest of Newington |
| 13 | Morewood Road; La Freniere Road | County Road 31 | County Road 6 | Crysler, North Winchester, Morewood | |
| 14 | County Road 14 | County Road 2 | County Road 43 | Ingleside, Osnabruck Centre, Newington | shares roadway with County Road 12 on section extending southwest of Newington |
| 15 | Avonmore Road; McLean Road | County Road 2 | King's Highway 138 | Valley Corners, Lodi, Avonmore, Northfield, Harrisons Corners, Lakeview Heights | |
| 16 | Brinston Road | County Road 2 | County Road 3 | Stampville, Dixons Corners, Brinston, Hulbert, Baldwins Bridge | |
| 17 | County Road 17 | County Road 27 | County Road 34 | MacGillivrays Bridge, Williamstown, Lancaster | |
| 18 | Glen Stewart Road; Cook Road; Dundela Road; King's Road | Byker Road | Quebec border | Glen Stewart, Hainsville, Dixons Corners, Dundela, Williamsburg, Hoasic, Osnabruck Centre, Lunenburg, Harrisons Corners, St. Andrews, Martintown, St. Raphaels | |
| 19 | County Road 19 | South Branch Road | County Road 18 | Grants Corners, Williamstown | |
| 20 | Kinloch Road; Apple Hill Road; Highland Road | County Road 19 | Highway 417 | Martintown, Apple Hill, Dominionville, Maxville, St. Elmo | |
| 21 | Lochiel Road; Lorne School Road; Glen Sandfield Road; Ste.-Anne Road | County Road 34 | Hope-Ouimet Road | Lochiel, Lorne, Glen Sandfield | |
| 22 | Dyer Road | King's Highway 138 | County Road 30 | Dyer, Maxville | |
| 23 | 4th Line; Dalhousie Road; Dalkieth Road | County Road 2 | Highway 417 | Curry Hill, Bridge End, Dalhousie Mill, Glen Robertson, Glen Sandfield, Dalkieth, Breadalbane | route interrupted by Quebec territory for 2.8 km (1 3/4 miles) around Dalhousie Station, QC |
| 24 | Laggan-Glenelg Road; Laggan Road | County Road 34 | Quebec border | Stewarts Glen, Dunvegan, Fiskes Corners, Laggan, Kirkhill, Dalkieth | |
| 25 | County Road 25; Concession Road 9 | County Road 20 | County Road 23 | Glenroy, Green Valley, Glen Norman | |
| 26 | 2nd Line Road | County Road 2 | County Road 18 | North Lancaster Station | |
| 27 | Summerstown Road | County Road 2 | County Road 18 | Summerstown station, MacGillivrays Bridge | |
| 28 | Glen Becker Road | County Road 31 | County Road 8 | Glen Becker | |
| 29 | County Road 29 | County Road 12 | County Road 15 | none | minor rural route |
| 30 | Greenfield Road | County Road 43 | Highway 417 | Dunvegan, Baltics Corners, Greenfield | |
| 31 | County Road 31 | County Road 4 | Marionville Road | Morrisburg, Glen Becker, Williamsburg, Winchester Springs, Cloverdale, Harmony | Continues north to Ottawa as Road 31 (Bank Street). Formerly Highway 31. |
| 32 | County Road 32 | County Road 13 | Marionville Road | Cannamore | |
| 33 | Power Dam Drive | Cornwall Centre Road | County Road 36 | Cornwall Centre | |
| 34 | County Road 34 | County Road 2 | Highway 417 | Lancaster, Green Valley, Alexandria, Laggan | |
| 35 | Moulinette Road | County Road 2 | County Road 29 | Long Sault | |
| 36 | Milles Roches Road; Post Road | County Road 2 | County Road 18 | Long Sault | |
| 37 | Queen Street | County Road 43 | County Road 7 | Chesterville | |
| 38 | Holmes Road; St. Lawrence Street | County Road 3 | County Road 3 | Winchester | |
| 39 | Duncan Street | County Road 34 | County Road 2 | Lancaster | |
| 40 | Stampville Road | County Road 5 | County Road 28 | Stampville | |
| 41 | Upper Canada Road | County Road 8 | County Road 2 | none | contains former St. Lawrence Parks Commission Upper Canada Road uploaded in June, 2016 |
| 42 | McConnell Avenue | South Branch Road | Headline Road | none | minor suburban route |
| 43 | County Road 43 | Boundary Road | County Road 34 | Hallville, Mulloys, Maple Ridge, Chesterville, Finch, Avonmore, Monkland, Alexandria | |
| 44 | Headline Road | King's Highway 138 | County Road 19 | none | minor rural route |
| 45 | Kenyon Dam Road; Kenyon Concession Road | County Road 43 | County Road 34 | none | minor rural route |
| 46 | MacDonald Boulevard; MacDougald Street West | County Road 43 | County Road 34 | Alexandria | |
