= List of numbered roads in Northumberland County =

List of county roads

This is a list of county arterial roads in Northumberland County, Ontario, Canada.

County Arterial Road	Local name(s)	Southern/western terminus	Northern/eastern terminus	Settlements served	Additional notes
2	County Road 2, various town streets (see notes)	East Townline Road	Walt Street	Welcome, Port Hope, Cobourg, Grafton, Colborne, Brighton, Smithfield	Part of old King's Highway 2. Also known as Toronto Road, Ridout Street, Walton Street, Mill Street and Peter Street, Port Hope; William Street and King Street, Cobourg; Toronto Street and King Street, Colborne; and Main Street and Elizabeth Street, Brighton.
8	County Road 8	County Road 30	Wingfield Road	Campbellford, English Line, Hoards	
9	Ganaraska Road	Cold Springs Camp Road	County Road 45	Elizabethville, Garden Hill, Bewdley	continues as Durham Road 9 to Kirby
10	County Road 10	County Road 2	Challice 1st Line	Welcome, Perrytown, Thomstown	continues as Peterborough County/Kawartha Lakes Road 10 to Pigeon Lake Road
15	Harwood Road	County Road 45	County Road 18	Harwood	
18	County Road 18; Burnham Street	County Road 2	County Road 45	Cobourg, Cold Springs, Gores Landing, Harwood, Alderville	
20	Elgin Street; Brook Road	County Road 18	County Road 2	Cobourg	
21	County Road 21	County Road 25	County Road 30	Tubbs Corners, Dundonald, Hilton	
22	County Road 22	County Road 45	County Road 25	Centreton, Castleton	
23	County Road 23; Lyle Street	County Road 2	County Road 22	Centreton, Grafton	
24	County Road 24	County Road 45	County Road 25	Roseneath, Dartford	
25	County Road 25	County Road 2	the Trent River	Colborne, Purdy Corners, Tubbs Corners, Castleton, Morganston, Warkworth, Hastings	
26	County Road 26	County Road 30	County Road 41	Spring Valley	
27	County Road 27	County Road 25	County Road 30	Morganston, Codrington	
28	County Road 28; Ontario Street	County Road 2	Hannah Road	Port Hope, Dale, Rosemount, Bewdley	continues as Peterborough County Road 28 to King's Highway 115
29	County Road 29	Regional Road 45	Percy Boom Road	Burnley, Warkworth	
30	County Road 30	County Road 2	Browns Line Road	Brighton, Spring Valley, Hilton, Orland, Codrington, Meyersburg, Campbellford, West Corners, Trent River	
31	Lakeport Road	Town Line Road	County Road 2	Colborne, Lakeport	
33	Merrill Road	County Road 45	7th Line	McCracken Landing	
35	County Road 35	County Road 25	County Road 30	Godolphin, West Corners	
38	County Road 38	County Road 8	Rylstone Road	Campbellford, Pethericks Corners	
41	New Wooler Road	County Road 30	Dalmas Road	Orland	
45	County Road 45; Division Street	County Road 2	County Road 25	Cobourg, Creighton Heights, Baltimore, Fenella, Alderville, Roseneath, Hastings	
50	County Road 50	County Road 30	Trent River Road	Campbellford, Healey Falls	
64	County Road 64; Prince Edward Street	County Road 2	Stoney Point Road	Brighton, Gosport	continues as Hastings County Road 64 to Loyalist Parkway
65	County Road 65	County Road 2	County Road 9	Osaca, Elizabethville	
66	Ontario Street	Presqu'ile Parkway	County Road 2	Brighton, Presqu'ile Provincial Park	
70	Jocelyn Street	County Road 2	County Road 28	Port Hope	
74	Dale Road	County Road 10	County Road 45	Welcome, Dale, Precious Corners, Baltimore	Formerly King's Highway 106
