= Morganston, Ontario =

- Dispersed rural community
- County Road 25 in Morganston

- Location within Ontario Location within Canada
- Coordinates: 44°08′45″N 77°52′09″W
- Country: Canada
- Province: Ontario
- County: Northumberland
- Township: Cramahe
- Time zone: UTC-5 (Eastern (EST))
  - Summer (DST): UTC-4 (EDT)
- GNBC Code: FDWQE

Morganston is a dispersed rural community in Cramahe Township, Northumberland County, Ontario, Canada.

== History ==
The settlement was first named "Snyder's Corners", after William Snyder, who built a home here in 1833.

A school was built in 1850, and a general store and post office opened in 1867.

The settlement was renamed "Morganston" in 1868, for the numerous Morgan family members who settled here.

The population in 1882 was about 90.

A cheese factory opened in 1885, and remained in business until the early 1960s. Morganston Methodist Church opened in 1910, and remained open until 1995.

Morganston, circa 1900
