= Cramahe, Ontario =

Cramahe
- Township (lower-tier)
- Township of Cramahe
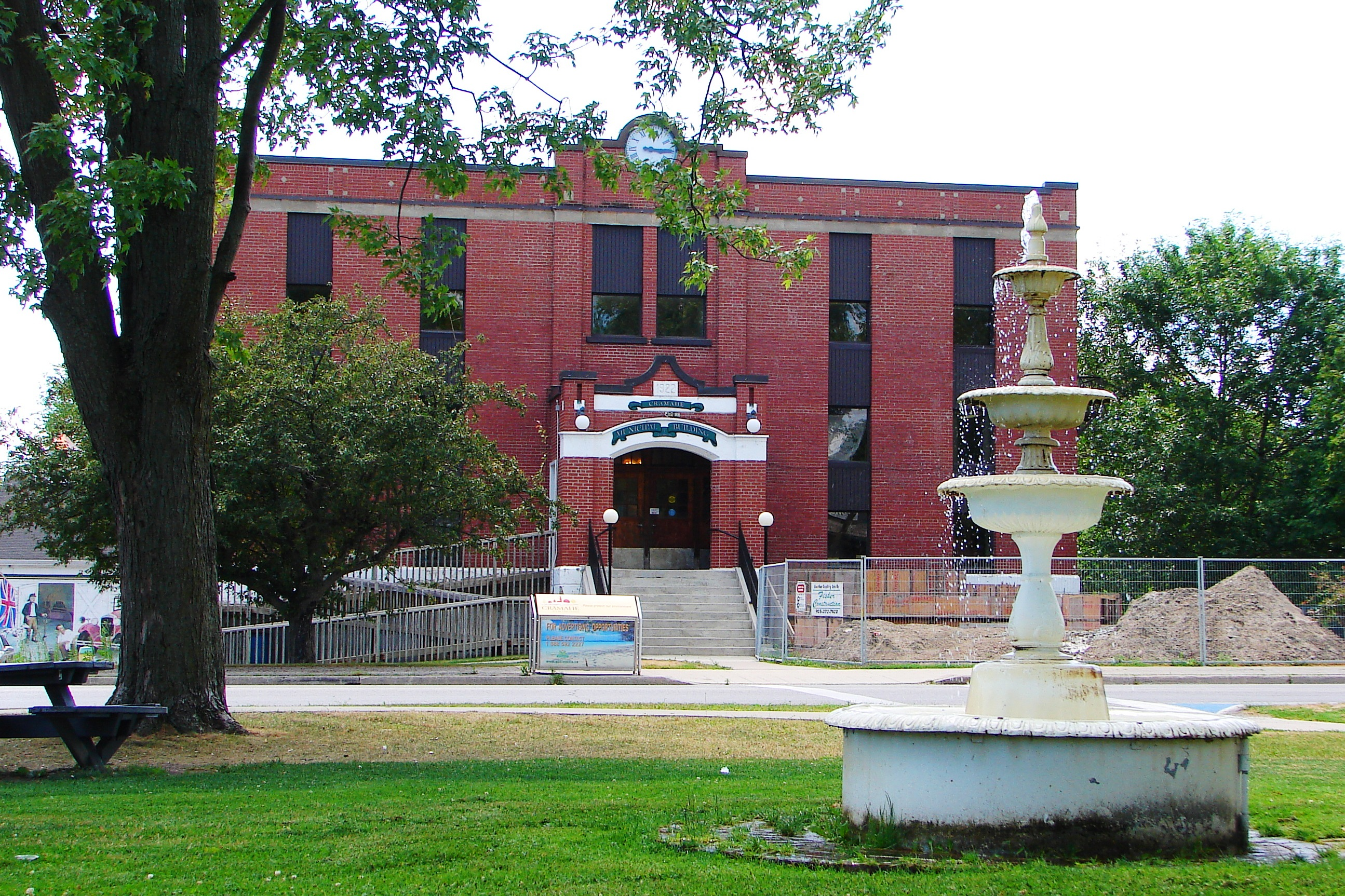
- Township hall in Colborne
- Motto: It's In Our Nature
- Location within Northumberland County Location within Southern Ontario
- Coordinates: 44°05′N 77°53′W
- Country: Canada
- Province: Ontario
- County: Northumberland
- Established: 1850

Government
  - Mayor: Mandy Martin
  - Fed. riding: Northumberland—Clarke
  - Prov. riding: Northumberland—Peterborough South

Area
  - Land: 202.22 km^{2} (78.08 sq mi)

Population (2021)
  - Total: 6,509
  - Density: 32.2/km^{2} (83/sq mi)
- Time zone: UTC-5 (EST)
  - Summer (DST): UTC-4 (EDT)
- Postal code: K0K 1S0
- Area codes: 905, 289, 365, and 742
- Website: www.cramahe.ca

Cramahe is a rural township located in Northumberland County of southern Ontario, Canada. It is situated just off Ontario Highway 401, approximately 140 km East of Toronto.

The township was named for Hector Theophilus de Cramahé, who was Lieutenant-Governor of the Province of Quebec from 6 June 1771 to 18 September 1774. The township's seat and largest town is Colborne.

== History ==
Joseph Keeler opened a store on the site of present-day Colborne about 1819. A community began to grow as other small businessmen followed suit. With the opening of harbour facilities in the 1840s and the arrival of the railway in 1840, Colborne became an important service centre for the region. Cramahe was incorporated as a township in 1850. In 1858, the Village of Colborne seceded from the township as a separate municipality. On January 1, 2001, both municipalities were reamalgamated to form an expanded Township of Cramahe.

== Communities ==
The township of Cramahe comprises a number of communities, including the following communities:

- Banford Station
- Browns Corners
- Castleton
- Colborne
- Dundonald
- East Colborne
- Edville
- Greenleys Corners
- Griffis Corners
- Loughbreeze
- Morganston
- Ogden Point
- Purdy Corners
- Salem
- Shiloh
- Spencer Point
- Tubbs Corners
- Victoria Beach
- Victoria Park

=== Colborne ===
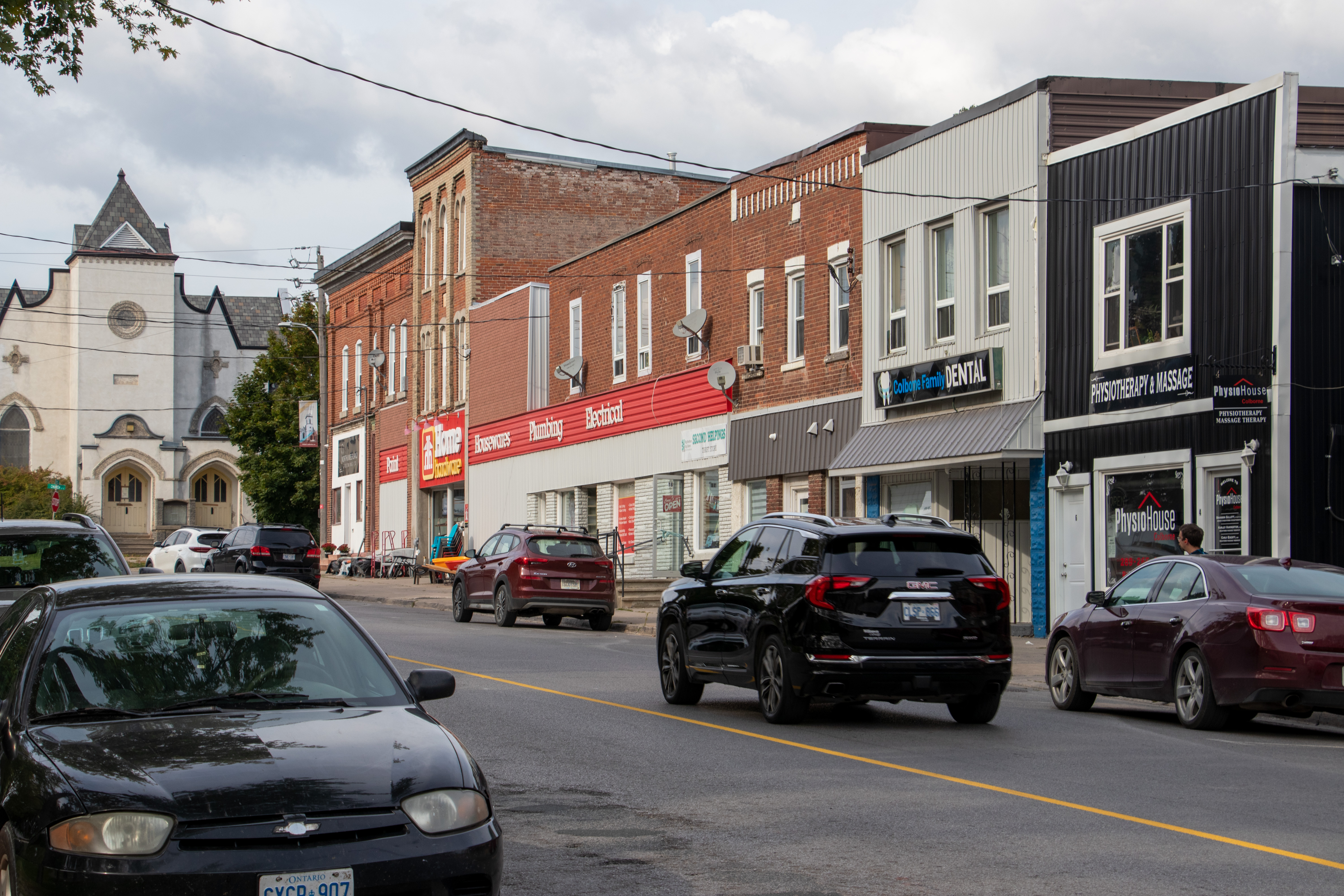
Percy Street, Downtown Colborne

Originally named Keeler's Creek, Colborne (44°00′20″N 77°53′20″W) is the largest and main population centre of the township. It was named after Sir John Colborne, Lieutenant Governor of Upper Canada, by Joseph Abbott Keeler in 1829. Colborne was incorporated as a village in 1858 with a population of approximately 700 people. In 2001, Colborne and Cramahe Township were amalgamated as part of municipal restructuring to form an expanded Township of Cramahe. At the time of dissolution, Colborne Village had a population of 2,040 over an area of 5.2 square kilometres (2.0 sq mi).

In the 2021 Census of Population, Colborne had a population of 1,474 living in 668 of its 696 total private dwellings, a change of −6.5% from its 2016 population of 1,577. With a land area of 1.74 km^{2} (0.67 sq mi), it had a population density of 847.1/km^{2} (2,194.0/sq mi) in 2021.

Colborne is the home of the Big Apple, a tourist attraction located along Ontario Highway 401. With a height of 10.7 metres (35 ft) and diameter of 11.6 metres (38 ft), the Big Apple is billed as the largest apple in the world. There is an observation deck on top of the apple, a restaurant and other amenities on the premises.

== Demographics ==
In the 2021 Census of Population conducted by Statistics Canada, Cramahe had a population of 6,509 living in 2,603 of its 2,772 total private dwellings, a change of 2.4% from its 2016 population of 6,355. With a land area of 202.22 km^{2} (78.08 sq mi), it had a population density of 32.2/km^{2} (83.4/sq mi) in 2021.

Canada census – Cramahe community profile

	2021	2016	2011
Population	6,509 (+2.4% from 2016)	6,355 (+4.6% from 2011)	6,073 (+2.1% from 2006)
Land area	202.22 km^{2} (78.08 sq mi)	202.16 km^{2} (78.05 sq mi)	201.98 km^{2} (77.98 sq mi)
Population density	32.2/km^{2} (83/sq mi)	31.4/km^{2} (81/sq mi)	30.1/km^{2} (78/sq mi)
Median age	49.2 (M: 48.8, F: 49.6)	48.4 (M: 47.9, F: 48.9)
Private dwellings	2,772 (total) 2,603 (occupied)	2,780 (total)	2,676 (total)
Median household income	$86,000	$70,505

References: 2021 2016 2011

Historical census populations – Cramahe, Ontario

Year	Pop.	±%
1871	3,833	—
1881	3,481	−9.2%
1891	2,995	−14.0%
1901	2,556	−14.7%
1911	2,373	−7.2%
1921	2,247	−5.3%
1931	2,224	−1.0%
1941	1,994	−10.3%

Year	Pop.	±%
1951	1,994	+0.0%
1956	2,041	+2.4%
1961	2,124	+4.1%
1966	2,184	+2.8%
1971	2,178	−0.3%
1976	2,428	+11.5%
1981	2,434	+0.2%
1986	2,495	+2.5%

Year	Pop.	±%
1991	3,108	+24.6%
1996	3,420	+10.0%
2001	5,713	+67.0%
2006	5,950	+4.1%
2011	6,073	+2.1%
2016	6,355	+4.6%
2021	6,509	+2.4%

Population counts are not adjusted for boundary changes or merger.
Source: Statistics Canada

Mother tongue according to the 2021 Canadian census:

- English as first language: 94.6%
- French as first language: 0.9%
- English and French as first language: 0.2%
- Other as first language: 3.5%

== Notable people ==
- Israel Wood Powell - Colborne born Member of The House of Assembly of Vancouver Island and British Columbia's First Superintendent of Indian Affairs
- Marcus A. Kemp - Colborne born member of the Wisconsin State Senate
- Charles Smith Rutherford - Colborne born recipient of the Victoria Cross for actions at the Battle of the Scarpe during the First World War
- William Arthur Steel
- Ed Greenwood
- Samantha Moore - Colborne born singer and songwriter

== See also ==
- List of townships in Ontario
