= 2014 Leeds and Grenville United Counties municipal elections =

Elections were held in Leeds and Grenville United Counties, Ontario on October 27, 2014 in conjunction with municipal elections across the province.

== Leeds and Grenville United Counties Council ==
The Council consists of the mayors and reeves of the constituent municipalities.

Position	Elected
Athens Mayor	Herb Scott (acclaimed)
Augusta Reeve	Doug Malanka
Edwardsburgh/Cardinal Mayor	Patrick Sayeau
Elizabethtown-Kitley Mayor	Jim Pickard (acclaimed)
Front of Yonge Mayor	Roger Haley (acclaimed)
Leeds and the Thousand Islands Mayor	Joe Baptista
Merrickville-Wolford Mayor	Dave Nash
North Grenville Mayor	David Gordon
Rideau Lakes Mayor	Ronald E. Holman
Westport Mayor	Robin Patricia Jones

== Athens ==
Mayoral Candidate	Vote	%
Herb Scott (X)	Acclaimed	

== Augusta ==
Reeve Candidate	Vote	%
Doug Malanka	1,316	54.63
Darlene Banning	1,093	45.37

== Edwardsburgh/Cardinal ==
Mayoral Candidate	Vote	%
Patrick Sayeau	1,061	38.41
David Dobbie	931	33.71
Bill Sloan (X)	770	27.88

== Elizabethtown-Kitley ==
Mayoral Candidate	Vote	%
Jim Pickard (X)	Acclaimed	

== Front of Yonge ==
Mayoral Candidate	Vote	%
Roger Haley (X)	Acclaimed	

== Leeds and the Thousand Islands ==
Mayoral Candidate	Vote	%
Joe Baptista	2,766	68.36
Heidi Conarroe	1,280	31.64

== Merrickville-Wolford ==
Mayoral Candidate	Vote	%
Dave Nash	680	58.37
Doug Struthers (X)	485	41.63

== North Grenville ==
Mayoral Candidate	Vote	%
David Gordon (X)	2,304	46.73
Bill Forbes	1,614	32.74
John Barclay	1,012	20.53

== Rideau Lakes ==
Mayoral Candidate	Vote	%
Ronald E. Holman (X)	2,415	44.81
Rob Dunfield	2,338	43.38
Donald Wills	636	11.80

== Westport ==
Mayoral Candidate	Vote	%
Robin Patricia Jones	278	67.97
Daniel John Grunig (X)	131	32.03
