= Kemptville Creek =

Kemptville Creek South Branch of the Rideau River
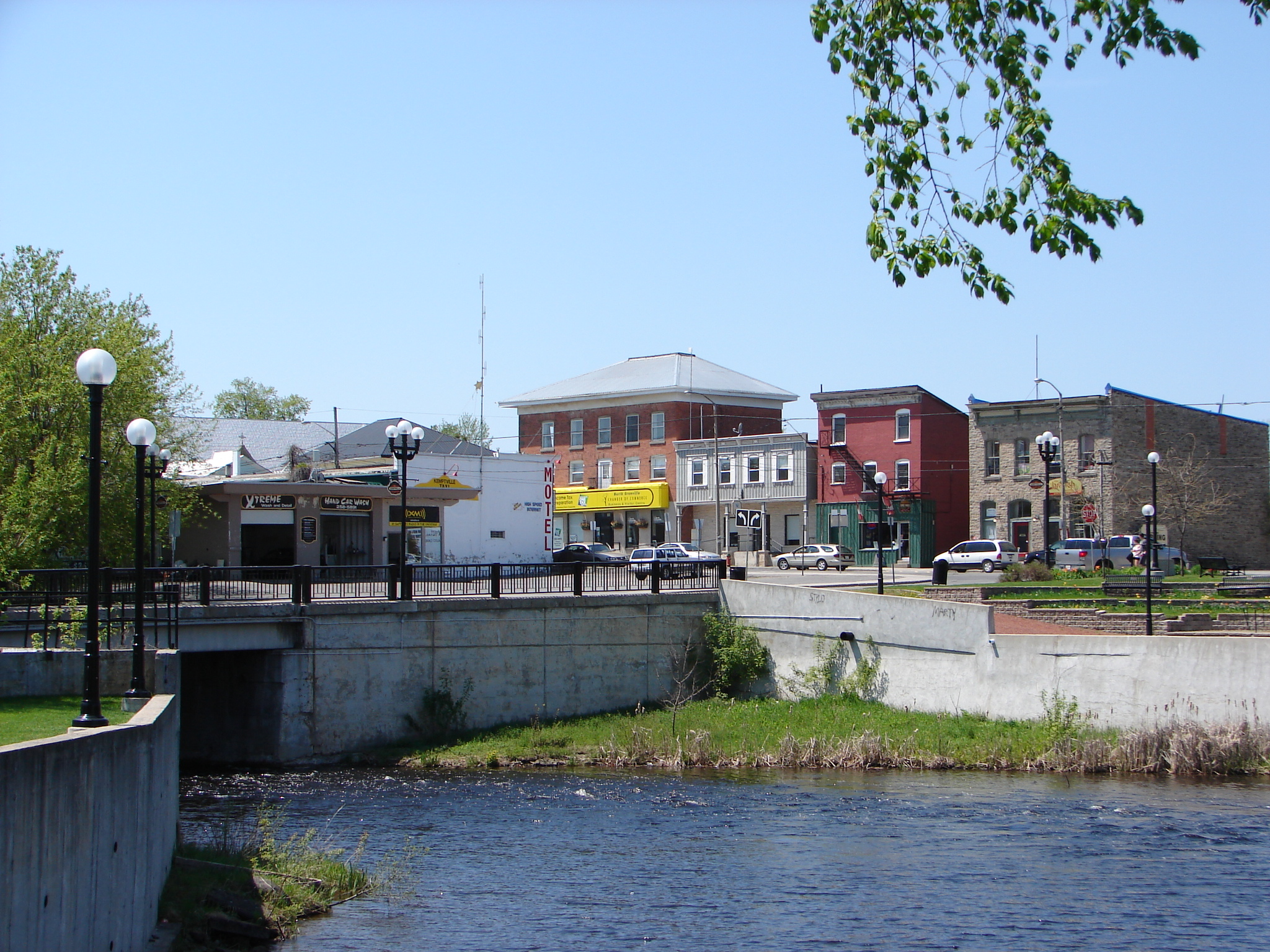
- Kemptville Creek in the town of Kemptville

- Location of the mouth of Kemptville Creek in southern Ontario

Location
- Country: Canada
- Province: Ontario
- Region: Eastern Ontario
- County: United Counties of Leeds and Grenville
- Municipalities: North Grenville; Augusta

Physical characteristics
- Source: unnamed marsh
  - location: North Augusta, Augusta
  - coordinates: 44°45′57″N 75°45′00″W
  - elevation: 112 m (367 ft)
- Mouth: Rideau River
  - location: Kemptville, North Grenville
  - coordinates: 45°03′21″N 75°39′15″W
  - elevation: 85 m (279 ft)
- Length: 69 km (43 mi)
- Basin size: 456 km^{2} (176 sq mi)

Basin features
- Progression: Rideau River→ Ottawa River→ St. Lawrence River→ Gulf of St. Lawrence
- River system: Ottawa River drainage basin

Kemptville Creek is a stream in the municipalities of North Grenville and Augusta, in the United Counties of Leeds and Grenville, in Eastern Ontario, Canada. It is in the Ottawa River drainage basin, is a right tributary of the Rideau River, and is under the auspices of the Rideau Valley Conservation Authority.

Kemptville Creek is 69 kilometres (43 mi) long and has a drainage basin of 456 square kilometres (176 sq mi). Portions of the drainage basin extend into other municipalities of Leeds and Grenville, such as Athens, Elizabethtown-Kitley and Merrickville–Wolford. The creek was historically referred to by the name South Branch of the Rideau River, until its name was changed to Kemptville Creek in 1908. However, the former name is still in use as of 2015.

== Geography ==
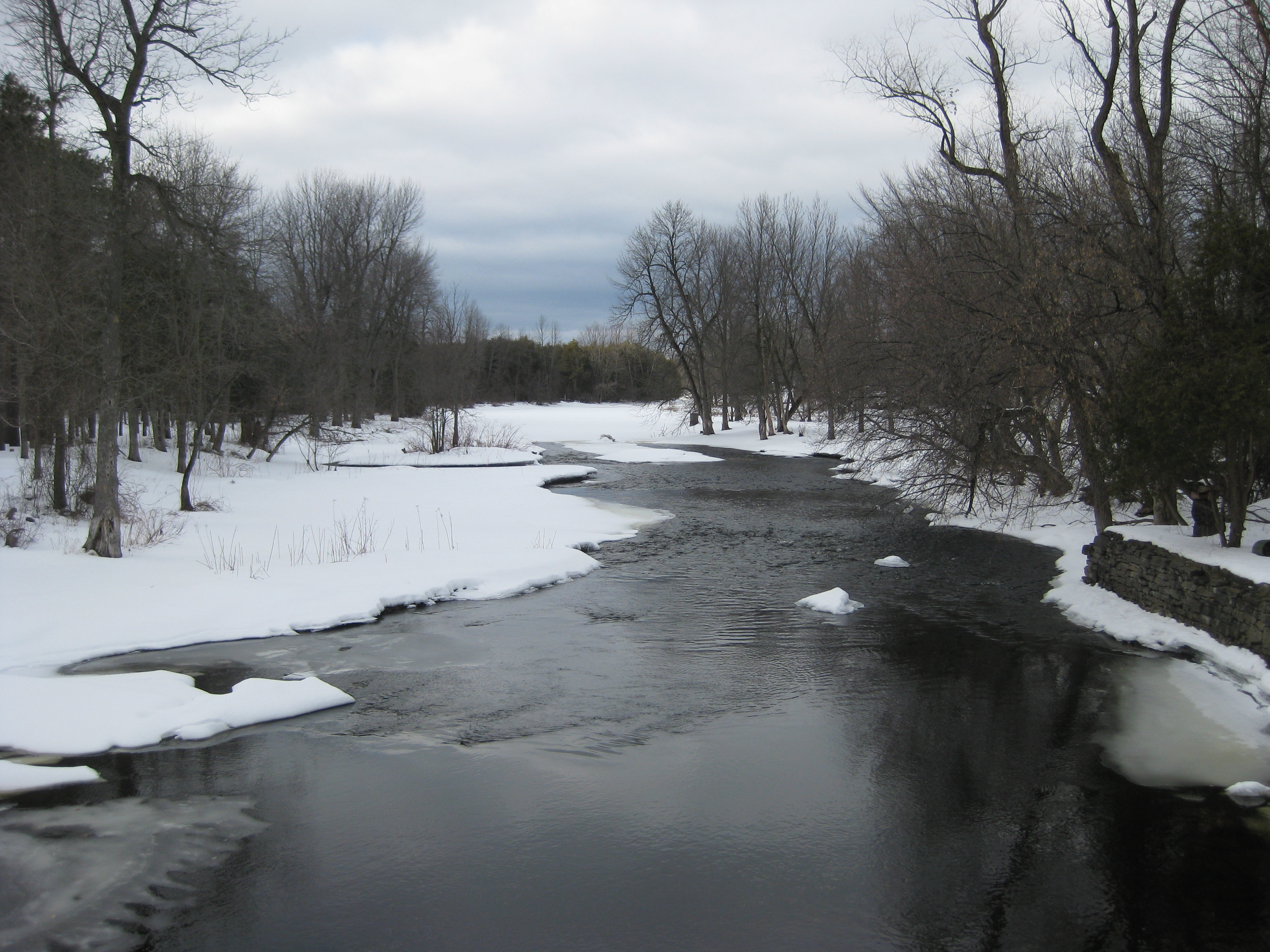
Kemptville Creek at Oxford Mills

The main branch, also called the South Branch, begins northwest of the community of North Augusta in the municipality of Augusta, where it immediately takes in the right tributary Mud Creek. It travels north, passing into North Grenville near the community of Bishop's Mills.

The North Branch begins at Cranberry Lake in Merrickville–Wolford, and flows northeast, passes into North Grenville as it flows through the community of Bishop's Mills, before joining the main branch northeast of the community.

Combined, the creek continues north through the community of Oxford Mills, where it goes over Oxford Mills Dam, flows under the Canadian Pacific Railway main line, heads through Kemptville, where it takes in the right tributary Barnes Creek, and reaches its mouth at the Rideau River. The Rideau River flows northward to the Ottawa River.

=== Tributaries ===
- Barnes Creek (right)
- North Branch Kemptville Creek (left)
  - Muldoons Creek
- Mud Creek (right)

== Recreation ==
The creek is navigable, for smaller watercraft, from the Rideau River to the town docks in Kemptville. In the summer it is also suitable for canoeing from Bishop's Mills to approximately 10 kilometres (6.2 mi) to the south of Oxford Mills (rough-launch near the railway bridge, or at the dam in town). In the spring, it should be possible to canoe from Oxford Station Road (or further) to the Rideau River with one portage.

== Sources ==
- Map 11 (PDF) (Map). 1 : 700,000. Official road map of Ontario. Ministry of Transportation of Ontario. 2014.
- Restructured municipalities - Ontario map #5 (Map). Restructuring Maps of Ontario. Ontario Ministry of Municipal Affairs and Housing. 2006. Archived from the original on 2020-05-11.
- Municipality of North Grenville (PDF) (Map). Municipality of North Grenville. Archived from the original (PDF) on 2013-11-01.
