= Tom Lowenstein =

English poet, ethnographer and cultural historian (1941–2025)

- Born: Thomas Godfrey Lowenstein; 15 August 1941 near London, England
- Died: 21 March 2025 (aged 83)
- Education: Leighton Park School; Queens' College, Cambridge (M.A., 1965); University of Leicester School of Education (Cert. Ed., 1966)
- Occupations: Poet, ethnographer, teacher, cultural historian and translator
- Website: tomlowenstein.wordpress.com

Thomas Godfrey Lowenstein (15 August 1941 – 21 March 2025) was an English poet, ethnographer, teacher, cultural historian and translator. Beginning his working life as a school teacher, he visited Alaska in 1973 and went on to become particularly noted for his work on Inupiaq (north Alaskan Eskimo) ethnography, conducting research in Point Hope, Alaska, between 1973 and 1988. His writing also encompasses several collections of poetry, as well as books related to Buddhism. From 1986, Lowenstein lived and continued teaching in London.

== Life and career ==
Thomas Godfrey Lowenstein was born on 15 August 1941 near London, England. He went to Leighton Park School, then studied at Queens' College, Cambridge, where he earned an M.A. degree in 1965 (and was briefly editor of the university magazine Granta), and the University of Leicester School of Education (Cert. Ed., 1966).

After university, Lowenstein taught in secondary schools in London (1966–1971), then for three years taught literature and creative writing in the United States at Northwestern University, Evanston, Illinois. In 1973, he worked for the Alaska State Museum, and went on to live on and off (between 1975 and 1988) in the Alaskan village of Point Hope, recording and translating the local history and legends.

He was awarded a Guggenheim Fellowship in 1979 in the field of Folklore and Popular Culture. Other awards for Lowenstein's research came from Northwestern University, the Nuffield Foundation, the Society of Authors, the British Academy, the National Endowment for the Arts, the Leverhulme Trust, the Arctic Institute of North America, The American Philosophical Society, Alaska Humanities Forum, and North Slope Borough, Alaska.

He subsequently (1981–1990) followed up an interest in Buddhist literature by studying Sanskrit and Pali at Cambridge University, SOAS University of London and the University of Washington.

Lowenstein also wrote texts for music collaborations, including with the composer Ed Hughes (composer) Sun, Moon and Women Shouting (1999) and The Sybil of Cumae (2001), and the libretto for Rachel Stott's oratorio Companion of Angels on the lives of William Blake and Catherine Blake.

His poetry collections include The Death of Mrs Owl (1975), Filibustering in Samsara (1987), Ancient Land: Sacred Whale (1993), Ancestors and Species: New & Selected Ethnographic Poetry (2005) and Conversation with Murasaki (2009). He was also a regular contributor to publications including London Review of Books and The Fortnightly Review.

Lowenstein's 2021 book, The Structure of Days Out, the last of his books on Alaska, was reviewed in P.N. Review by Canadian poet and travel writer Marius Kociejowski, who observeded that Lowenstein in his ninth decade still lingered "in the margins of the literary scene", and stated: "If there is justice enough, he will be brought to its centre. His most recent book, the fourth title in a series about the Alaskan Inupiaq, The Structure of Days Out is the most personal.... The book goes over and beyond any interest one might have in the region and its people, so by the time we reach its penultimate chapter ‘The House of Time’ it becomes, perhaps unwittingly, a lively skeleton of the writer’s credo. A work both haunting and haunted."

Lowenstein died on 21 March 2025, at the age of 83.

== Selected bibliography ==
=== Poetry ===
- Our After-fate, Softy Loudly Books, 1971
- Eskimo Poems from Canada and Greenland (translation), London: Allison & Busby, 1973; University of Pittsburgh Press, 1973
- The Death of Mrs Owl, London: Anvil Press Poetry, 1975. ISBN 978 0 856460 31 9
- Booster – A Game of Divination, London: Many Press, 1975
- La Tempesta’s X-ray, Many Press, 1988
- Filibustering in Samsara, Many Press, 1987
- Ancient Land: Sacred Whale, Bloomsbury, Farrar Straus and Giroux, Harvill Press. ISBN 978-1846555763
- Ancestors and Species, Shearsman Books, 2005
- Conversation with Murasaki, Shearsman Books, 2009
- From Culbone Wood – in Xanadu: Notebooks and Fanasias, Shearsman Books, 2013
- The Bridge at Uji, Shearsman Books, 2022. ISBN 9781848617971

=== Works on North-west Alaska ===
- Stories from Point Hope, Alaska State Museum, Juneau, 1973
- Sea Ice Subsistence at Point Hope, Alaska, North Slope Borough, 1980
- The Shaman Aningatchaq, translation & commentary, Many Press, London, 1982
- The Things That Were Said of Them: Oral Histories from Point Hope, University of California Press / Douglas & McIntyre, 1990
- Ancient Land: Sacred Whale, prose and poetry, Bloomsbury, Harvill Press, Farrar Straus & Giroux, 1993 and 2001. ISBN 978-1602230385
- Ultimate Americans: Point Hope, Alaska 1826–1909, University of Alaska Press, 2009
- The Structure of Days Out, Shearsman Books, 2021 ISBN 9781848617681, 2021

=== Buddhist-related works ===
- The Vision of the Buddha: Buddhism — The Path to Spiritual Enlightenment, Duncan Baird Publishers /Macmillan, 1996, ISBN 978-1-900131-19-3
- Treasures of the Buddha, Duncan Baird Publishers, 2006
- Classic Haiku, Duncan Baird Publishers, 2007
