= Marius Kociejowski =

Canadian-born poet, essayist and travel writer (born 1949)

- Born: 1949 (age 76–77); Bishop's Mills, Ontario, Canada
- Occupations: Poet; essayist; travel writer
- Notable work: Coast (1990)
- Awards: Cheltenham Prize for Literature

Marius Kociejowski (born 1949) is a Canadian-born poet, essayist and travel writer.

== Biography ==
Kociejowski was born in 1949 in Bishop's Mills, Ontario, to a Polish father and an English mother. In 1973, he left Canada and later settled in London.

His first publication, Coast (1990), won the Cheltenham Prize for Literature in 1991. Kociejowski works as an antiquarian bookseller specializing in poetry. His interest in Syria has led him to research and write two books about the country, and edit a Syrian anthology of travel writing. His book God's Zoo (2014) consists of a series of encounters with creative artists living in London who have become exiles from their cultural and geographical roots.

== Works ==
=== Poetry ===
- Coast (Greville Press, 1990)
- Doctor Honoris Causa (Anvil Press, 1993)
- Music's Bride (Anvil Press, 1999). A Canadian edition of his poems, which collected the above
- So Dance the Lords of Language (Porcupine's Quill in 2003) – a Canadian edition containing the above collections in a single volume.
- Collected Poems (Carcanet, 2019)

=== Prose ===
- The Street Philosopher and the Holy Fool: A Syrian Journey (Sutton, 2004; new edition by Eland in 2016)
- Syria through Writers' Eyes (Eland, 2006) - an anthology edited by Kociejowski
- The Pigeon Wars of Damascus (Biblioasis, 2010) - a sequel to The Street Philosopher
- The Pebble Chance: Feuilletons and Other Prose (Biblioasis, 2014)
- God’s Zoo: Artists, Exiles, Londoners (Carcanet, 2014)
- Zoroaster's Children and Other Travels (Biblioasis, 2015)
- A Factotum in the Book Trade: A Memoir (Biblioasis, 2022)
- The Serpent Coiled in Naples (Haus, 2022)
