= Actons Corners, Ontario =

Actons Corners
- Compact rural community
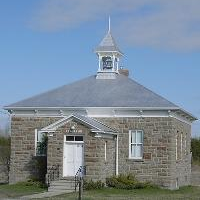
- North Grenville Archives, formerly Actons Corners School
- Etymology: Named for John Acton
- Location of Actons Corners in Southern Ontario
- Coordinates: 44°59′23″N 75°42′45″W
- Country: Canada
- Province: Ontario
- County: United Counties of Leeds and Grenville
- Municipality: North Grenville
- Elevation: 106 m (348 ft)
- Time zone: UTC-5 (Eastern Time Zone)
  - Summer (DST): UTC-4 (Eastern Time Zone)
- Postal code: K0G 1J0
- Area codes: 613, 343

Actons Corners is a community in the municipality of North Grenville, United Counties of Leeds and Grenville, in eastern Ontario, Canada. An unincorporated place and compact rural community, it is located on County Road 43 (formerly provincial Highway 43) between Kemptville and Merrickville at the intersection with Actons Corners Road (north to the Rideau River) and County Road 25 (south to Oxford Mills).

Except for an historic stone church built in the late 19th century, the North Grenville Archives, and a brickyard, the area consists mainly of farms and homes set in a mixture of farmland and cedar forest.

Addresses in the community are either listed as RR #1, Oxford Mills or RR #5, Kemptville.

== History ==
The intersection was created between Lots 15 and 16 of Concessions 2 and 3 of Oxford Township in the early 19th century and was originally named Bobtown, with only a Blacksmith's shop in the area. In the late 1820s, Robert Acton (for whom the community is named) and his family arrived from West Connaught, Ireland, and settled on Lot 16, Concession 3. Robert's son, John Acton, was a capable shoemaker, but worked on the Rideau Canal as a stonemason and later constructed several buildings in the township including the grist mill at Oxford Mills and the stone house at Actons Corners that replaced the family's original log dwelling.

At its height, Actons Corners boasted a post office, a school, two churches, a cheese factory, and an Orange Hall.

The post office operated between the 1890s and 1912, when it was replaced by rural mail delivery from Kemptville. A stone school was first opened in 1858 to replace two log schools to the east and west of the village. In 1905 the school was demolished and replaced with a new stone building which became the North Grenville Archives in 1998. A white-framed Methodist Church was constructed in 1875 and a stone Anglican church, St. Augustine, was built in 1879. The Methodist church was sold and removed in 1963, while the Anglican church remains standing, though it has been deconsecrated and is now privately owned. Scott's Cheese Factory was built in 1886 and operated until 1948. The Orange Hall served as a community centre until it was closed and the building sold and moved in the late 1930s.
