= North Augusta, Ontario =

North Augusta
- Police village
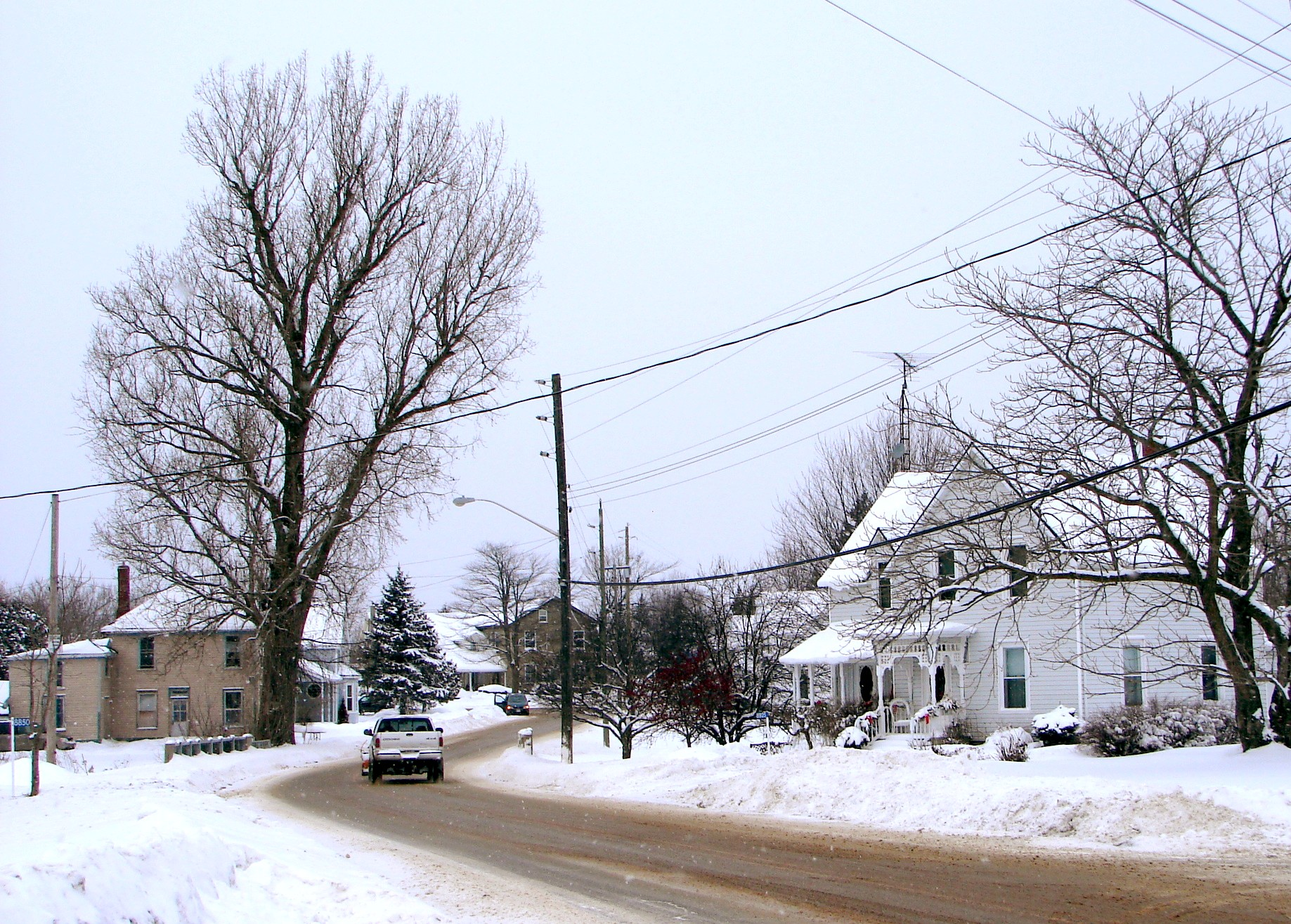

- Location of North Augusta in Southern Ontario
- Coordinates: 44°45′38″N 75°44′17″W
- Country: Canada
- Province: Ontario
- County: United Counties of Leeds and Grenville
- Municipality: Augusta
- Elevation: 107 m (351 ft)

Population
  - Total: 500
- Time zone: UTC-5 (Eastern Time Zone)
  - Summer (DST): UTC-4 (Eastern Time Zone)
- Postal code: K0G 1R0
- Area codes: 613, 343

North Augusta is a settlement located in the township of Augusta, United Counties of Leeds and Grenville, in Eastern Ontario, Canada. An unincorporated place and police village, it had a population of approximately 550 at its height in the late 1800s. The community was originally called Bellamy's Mills after the Bellamy family who purchased a mill here around 1812. North Augusta is located about 20 kilometres (12 mi) north of the city of Brockville and 19 kilometres (12 mi) northwest of Prescott. Kemptville Creek begins near the community.

== History ==
=== 18th and 19th centuries ===
North Augusta was first settled by United Empire Loyalists who received land here as grants for their loyalty to the Crown after the Revolutionary War. The community began to grow around a saw mill that was erected in 1811 by a man named Daniel Dunham. A year after the mill was constructed, Dunham sold it to the Bellamy family; the original name of North Augusta was Bellamy's Mills named after this saw mill. The Bellamys soon established a grist mill on one of their properties and began to purchase other properties within the area. Other Loyalist settlers were drawn to the area, and other pioneer industries and businesses set up shop around the mills.

In the mid-19th century, the village boasted a blacksmith, cooper, tannery, carding mills, a shingle mill, post office, schoolhouse, churches, a temperance hall and a general store on top of the pre-existing saw and grist mills. Opening in 1848, a hotel operated in the village with an adjoining frame tavern for a period of time. The temperance movement, which was popular in the area at the time, led to the tavern's closure; many residents fought and succeeded in restricting the inn's distribution of alcohol. The inn was no longer able to sell alcohol during cattle fairs, which was its prime source of revenue and as a result it was shut down. The building which once housed the inn was destroyed in 1902 and but was rebuilt by the former innkeeper's widow. The structure became a private residence.

In the late 19th century, the usual businesses were still in operation in the village, however the village had greatly expanded. At this time, North Augusta had its own newspaper in print, called the North Augusta Hustler which was later called the North Augusta Citizen. The village was now home to a carriage factory, five general stores, a barber, two hotels and a cheese factory. The population at this time was listed as 550 individuals.

=== 20th century ===
At the start of the 20th century, North Augusta became a police village and the population of the village had dropped to 500 people. Additionally, there was a decrease in the number of businesses present in the community. In 1903, the saw mill ceased operations after it burned; it was not rebuilt because much of the virgin forest had been depleted. With improved transportation, the other businesses in the village began to slowly close as residents could travel for goods, or import their goods from other locations. In 1909, a bank opened in the village and in 1915 a two-storey school was built. It eventually became a continuation school.

In the later parts of the 20th century, the community had very few businesses still in operation as pioneer trades became obsolete and roads were improved even further. Many of the stores closed, and the school, factories, and mills had all ceased operations. Bellamy's mill (bought and donated by Dr. Charles William Elliott Danby*) was moved to Upper Canada Village, an open air museum, where it was restored to mid-19th century era and equipped to run by steam or water power; it was used by the Upper Canada Village to produce flour for its bakery and to grind feed for their animals.

- Dr. Danby was the grandson of the Very Reverend Mark Danby, buried in North Augusta.

== Community ==
Currently, the community is served by Riopelle’s Convenience Store and LCBO. The Creekside Diner and Foley's Auto Wrecking. North Augusta also has a volunteer fire department and a community hall which holds council meetings, small concerts and other community functions.

== Religion and churches ==
North Augusta has been home to many separate churches: an Anglican church, Presbyterian church, Roman Catholic church and three Methodist churches have all at one time served the village. The Anglican church is called St, Peter's Anglican Church, as is located along Branch Road north of the village's centre. This church was rebuilt once; the original St. Peter's church was a frame building constructed in the early-to-mid 1800s. According to the first church's deed, it was a frame building with a balcony, four frosted windows and a steeple and bell. According to local historians, the timber used to the build the church was salvaged from a ship which had run aground near Blue Church. The building was later used by the Orange Lodge and after that as a barn before being dismantled; original timbers from the church were used to construct a wooden cross which is located in the new St. Peter's church. The St. Peter's church which currently stands was built on the same site as the former church made from locally manufactured brick in 1884.

The Presbyterian church located in North Augusta is located across from the fire hall along Mill Street. The building which currently stands was the third Presbyterian church; it is unknown why the church was rebuilt at this time and little is known of the first church. The first time a Presbyterian church is mentioned in North Augusta is in an 1846 issue of the Recorder and Times newspaper; it is also mentioned in census records, which list a stone Presbyterian church as being in operation in 1851. The second Presbyterian church building was constructed around 1876 and was torn down in 1886, with the present structure being built in its spot four years later in 1890. The Presbyterian church operated until 1925 when it closed due to lack of attendance. The building is currently being used as a community hall.

The Roman Catholic church located in North Augusta is situated along County Road 15 and is called St. Theresa's Roman Catholic Church. This church was built in the 1970s to replace the St. Theresa's Church formerly located in Throoptown which was destroyed by fire. The church is a frame building with white aluminium siding. There is a statue of St. Theresa located above the entrance door to the church which was salvaged from the original church. This church is currently still in use.

Over the years, there were three separate Methodist churches located within North Augusta. There were two Wesleyan Methodist churches, one being called the Wesleyan Methodist New Connexion and one Methodist Episcopal church. There is little record of the Methodist Episcopal church's existence; it is possible only a congregation existed with no building. The first Wesleyan Methodist church was a frame building with no tower, steeple or bell. It was probably torn down around 1851, as that is the date a new church was built to serve as the Wesleyan Methodist church. This second church was torn down around 1913 and replaced by a new stone church which still stands along Main Street in North Augusta. This church became known as North Augusta United Church around 1925 during a church union.

The Wesleyan Methodist New Connexion Church was built around 1858 on the south side of Branch Road. This church was used until the church union of 1874, when the congregation amalgamated with the Wesleyan Methodist Church and began using their church. The building was unused for a period before being converted into a private home. The building still stands, however it has been renovated extensively. The outside is covered in white stucco, however the outlines of the Gothic-style church windows can still be seen.

== Cemeteries ==
North Augusta is home to three cemeteries, two of which accompany one of the community's churches. The North Augusta Anglican Cemetery is located behind the Anglican church along Branch Road. It is said by some local historians that this burial ground was an old native burial ground before it was used by the European settlers. The earliest legible stone in the cemetery belongs to a Robert Blake, who died September 17, 1836. This burial took place around two decades before many of the other burials, with the second earliest stone being from 1854. This cemetery is still in use today.

North Augusta's Presbyterian cemetery is located behind the current community hall, which was once the Presbyterian church. This cemetery was used since at least since the early-to-mid 1800s, with the first legible stone reading: "Samuel son of Hiram and Polly Bellamy d. 8 May 1833 in 17th year of his age." This cemetery is cared for by the township council and has not been used in recent years. The man credited with being the founder of the village of North Augusta, Justus Bellamy is buried here.

The North Augusta United cemetery, called Sandy Hill cemetery is located south of the village along County Road 15. The land for this cemetery was purchased from locals in two parts, with one piece of land bought for $25 and the other for $15 in 1877 and 1878 respectively. The earliest known burial is that of one Mary Ethel Whitworth, who died in June 1877 at five years of age.

== Education ==
In the early nineteenth century, there were two schoolhouses recorded as being present in the area on maps of the township; there are no records of these schools, so little details are known of how they operated. In the same century, the township of Augusta was divided into school sections each of which had its own schoolhouse to serve the section. North Augusta was labelled school section seventeen, and in 1915 a school aptly titled S.S. #17 North Augusta School was built. The school was a two-storey building with a basement, much larger than the other schoolhouses operating here at the time. It was a concrete block building with a built-up tar and gravel roof and a brick chimney constructed from the foundation; the floors were made of hardwood and the hallways and ceilings were plaster. The school had a total of four classrooms, two on each floor with a chemistry lab located on the second floor. The school was heated by a coal-fed furnace and water needed to be transported from a separate dwelling.

Through an Act of Parliament, continuation schools which served both elementary and post-elementary grades (grades 1 through 12) were authorized to operate and North Augusta School became one. As enrolment fell into the 1970s, the school became a primary school with other students being transported to Algonquin Public School or Maynard Public School, or to the surrounding high schools depending on age. Despite public outcry from residents of North Augusta, the school was permanently closed 1981 as enrolment was low and it was too expensive to maintain. The building was demolished shortly after it closed due to deterioration.

Currently, there is no school located within North Augusta. Students from the community may attend the nearby Maynard Public School in Maynard for elementary school, the only remaining school within the township or may commute to Brockville. For secondary school, students may attend in Prescott at South Grenville District High School or in Brockville at one of their many secondary schools.

== Recreation ==
The village has a soccer field as well as 2 baseball diamonds, with soccer and baseball leagues running throughout the summer. A new Horseshoe Club, (North Augusta Horseshoe Federation) also runs on Tuesday evenings throughout the summer. A new children's playground was installed in 2011 replacing the old wooden one. An important attraction is the village's annual Labour Day Festival, which offers festivities over a five-day period. Photo Contests, parade, baseball tournaments, car show, and a horseshoe tournament, bingo, euchre tournament, kid's movie, kid's games and midway are only some of the activities spread over the festival.

== See also ==
- Royal eponyms in Canada
