= Bishop's Mills, Ontario =

Bishop's Mills
- Compact rural community
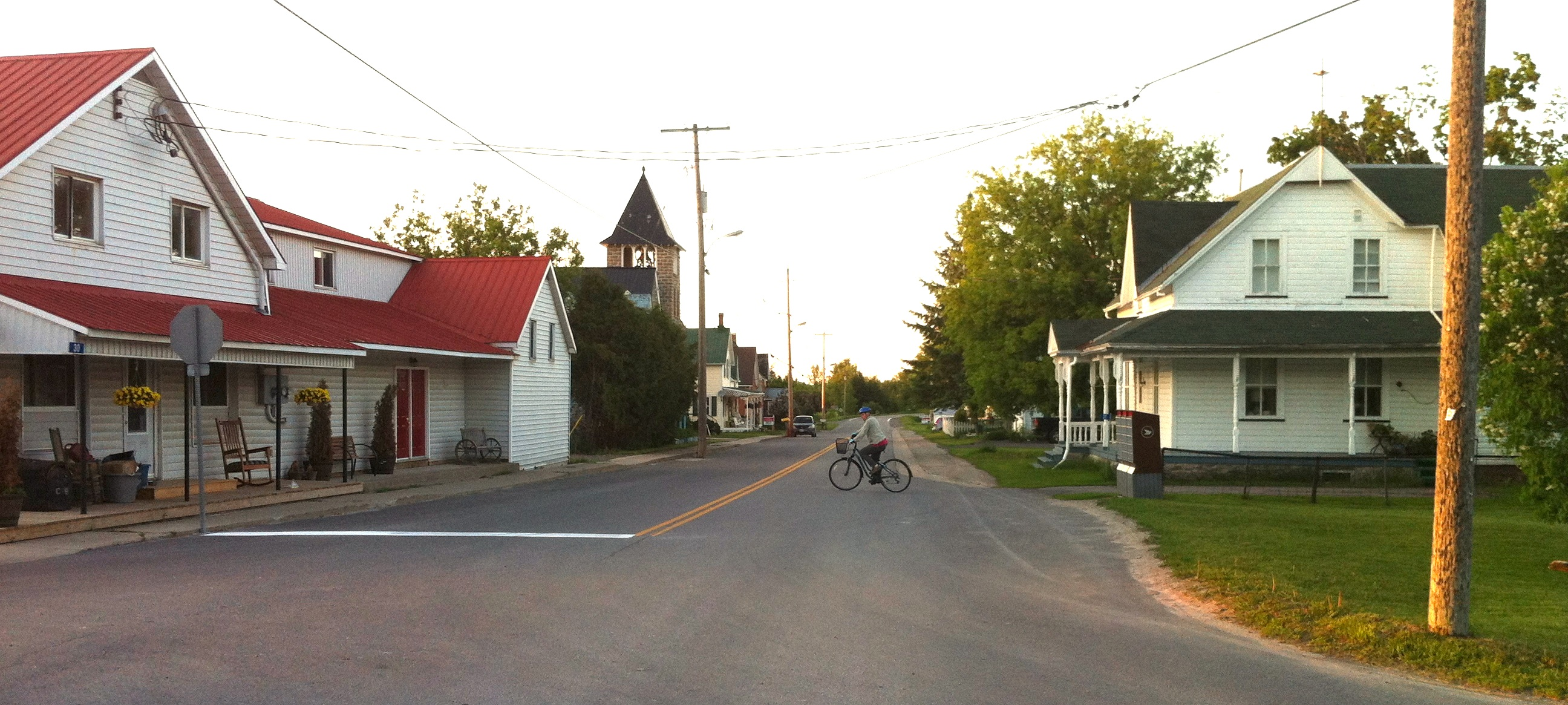
- Main street of Bishop's Mills

- Location of Bishop's Mills in Southern Ontario
- Coordinates: 44°52′25″N 75°42′16″W
- Country: Canada
- Province: Ontario
- County: United Counties of Leeds and Grenville
- Municipality: North Grenville
- Settled: 1840
- Founder: Chauncey Bishop, Ira Bishop
- Elevation: 106 m (348 ft)

Population
  - Total: 135
- Time zone: UTC-5 (Eastern Time Zone)
  - Summer (DST): UTC-4 (Eastern Time Zone)
- Postal code: K0G 1T0
- Area codes: 613, 343

Bishop's Mills is a community in the municipality of North Grenville, United Counties of Leeds and Grenville, in eastern Ontario, Canada, approximately 80 kilometres (50 mi) south of Ottawa, south of Kemptville and east of Merrickville. An unincorporated place and Compact Rural Community, it has a population of about 135 and is the home of the Bishops Mills Natural History Centre.

The village name is derived from a grist mill and a saw mill built on a branch of the Rideau River, today called the North Branch of Kemptville Creek, by Chauncey Bishop (1796–1877) and his brother, Ira (1803–1883). Descended from Loyalists originally from Connecticut, Chauncey and Ira founded Bishop's Mills in the 1840s on land acquired from King's College, now the University of Toronto. This land was part of Lot 2 and 3, 9th Concession of Oxford Township, Grenville County, in what was then known as Upper Canada. A surveyed village plan was registered in 1885.
