= North Grenville =

- Municipality (lower-tier)
- Municipality of North Grenville
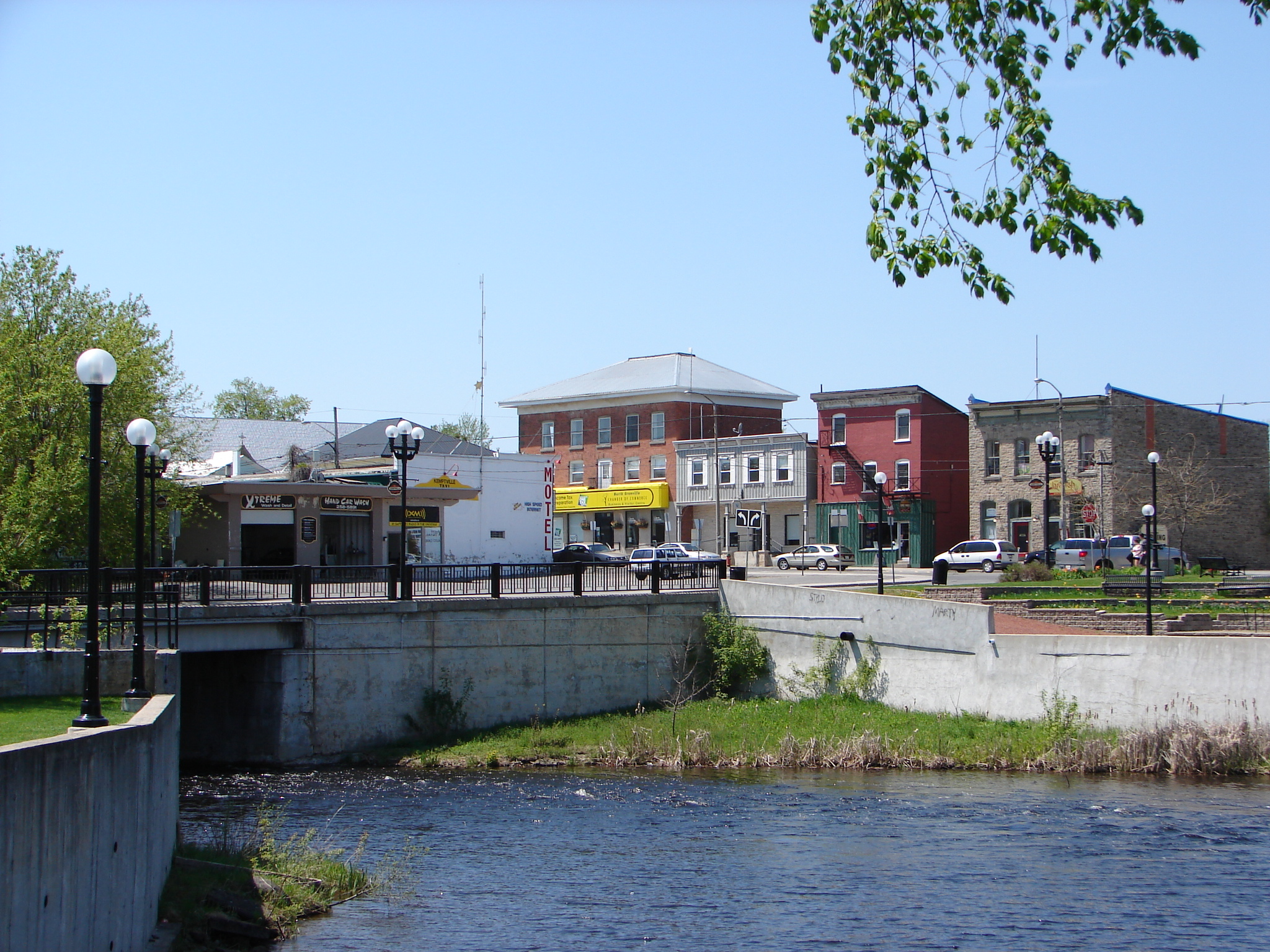
- Kemptville, largest community in North Grenville

- Location within United Counties of Leeds and Grenville Location within Southern Ontario
- Coordinates: 44°58′N 75°39′W
- Country: Canada
- Province: Ontario
- County: Leeds and Grenville
- Formed: January 1, 1998

Government
  - Type: Township
  - Mayor: Nancy Peckford
  - Fed. riding: Leeds—Grenville—Thousand Islands—Rideau Lakes
  - Prov. riding: Leeds—Grenville—Thousand Islands and Rideau Lakes

Area
  - Land: 351.90 km^{2} (135.87 sq mi)

Population (2021)
  - Total: 17,964
  - Density: 51/km^{2} (130/sq mi)
- Time zone: UTC−05:00 (EST)
  - Summer (DST): UTC−04:00 (EDT)
- Area codes: 613, 343
- Website: www.northgrenville.on.ca

North Grenville is a township in eastern Ontario, Canada, in the United Counties of Leeds and Grenville on the Rideau River. It is located just south of Ottawa in Canada's National Capital Region.

The Township of North Grenville was established on January 1, 1998, through the amalgamation of Oxford-on-Rideau Township, South Gower Township, and the Town of Kemptville. In 2003, a motion of the municipal council adopted the designation of 'municipality'.

== Communities ==
The largest community in North Grenville is Kemptville, with a population of 4,051 in the 2021 census (up from 3,911 in the 2016 census, and 3,620 in 2011). It is located on the Kemptville Creek (also known as South Branch of the Rideau River) approximately 56 kilometres (35 mi) south of Ottawa, sitting midway between suburban Ottawa and the Ogdensburg–Prescott International Bridge along Highway 416. The administrative offices of the municipality are located in Kemptville.

Other communities in the municipality include:

- Actons Corners
- Bedell
- Bishops Mills
- Burritts Rapids (the oldest community on the Rideau River)
- East Oxford
- Heckston
- Hutchins Corners
- McReynolds
- Millars Corners
- Mountain
- Newmanville
- Oxford Mills
- Oxford Station
- Pattersons Corners
- Peltons Corners
- Sabourins Crossing
- Schipaville
- Swan Crossing
- Van Allens

== Demographics ==
In the 2021 Census of Population conducted by Statistics Canada, North Grenville had a population of 17,964 living in 7,038 of its 7,244 total private dwellings, a change of 9.2% from its 2016 population of 16,451. With a land area of 351.9 km^{2} (135.9 sq mi), it had a population density of 51.0/km^{2} (132.2/sq mi) in 2021.

Canada census – North Grenville community profile

	2021	2016	2011
Population	17,964 (+9.2% from 2016)	16,451 (+9.1% from 2011)	15,085 (6.2% from 2006)
Land area	351.90 km^{2} (135.87 sq mi)	352.18 km^{2} (135.98 sq mi)	352.14 km^{2} (135.96 sq mi)
Population density	51.0/km^{2} (132/sq mi)	46.7/km^{2} (121/sq mi)	42.8/km^{2} (111/sq mi)
Median age	46.4 (M: 45.2, F: 46.8)	45.6 (M: 44.9, F: 46.2)
Private dwellings	7,244 (total) 7,038 (occupied)	6,658 (total) 6,439 (occupied)	5,908 (total)
Median household income	$108,000	$77,279

References: 2021 2016 2011

Historical census populations – North Grenville
Year	Pop.	±%
2001	13,581	—
2006	14,198	+4.5%
2011	15,085	+6.2%
2016	16,451	+9.1%
2021	17,964	+9.2%
Source: Statistics Canada

Mother tongue (2021):

- English as first language: 88.2%
- French as first language: 5.6%
- English and French as first language: 1.3%
- Other as first language: 4.2%

== See also ==
- List of francophone communities in Ontario
- List of townships in Ontario
- North Grenville District High School
