= Thaddeus William Henry Leavitt =

American-Canadian historian (1844–1909)

Thaddeus William Henry Leavitt (1844 – 21 June 1909) was an American-Canadian teacher, journalist, author and editor, public servant. He was the author of a number of books and the founder of the Brockville Daily Times.

== Early life ==
Leavitt was born in Connecticut in 1844 and raised in Leeds County, Ontario.

== Career ==
Leavitt worked as a teacher in the 1860s before he became the editor of the Brockville Recorder newspaper.

In 1883, Leavitt founded the Brockville Daily Times as a conservative newspaper. In 1918, the Daily Times merged with The Recorder to become The Recorder and Times.

In 1894, Leavitt started the Toronto journal Public Opinion. The same year, he got a job at the Customs Service in Ottawa. But he resigned from Customs in 1899 at the request of Sir Charles Tupper, Prime Minister of Canada, to become a Conservative organiser for Eastern Ontario.

He later became Inspector of Ontario Libraries.

== Personal life ==
Leavitt married Lydia Brown in 1869. The couple wrote at least one book together. She died in 1905.

Leavitt died on the morning of Monday 21 June 1909 at the home of his brother, Dr Arvin Leavitt. His brother, William H. Leavitt had been the publisher of a number of his books.

== Notable works ==
Leavitt was the author of a number of books, including historical books about Australia.

These included:

- History of Leeds and Grenville Ontario: from 1749 to 1879 (1879)
- The Jubilee History of Tasmania, Illustrated (1887)
- Australian Representative Men (1887)
- The Jubilee History of Victoria and Melbourne, illustrated (1888) ed W.D. Lilburn
- The Witch of Plum Hollow (1892)
- Lydia Leavitt and Thad. W. H. Leavitt, "Wise or Otherwise" (1898)
- Kaffir, Kangaroo, Klondike: Tales of the Gold Fields (1898)
