= Augusta, Ontario =

Township in Ontario, Canada

Augusta
- Township (lower-tier)
- Township of Augusta
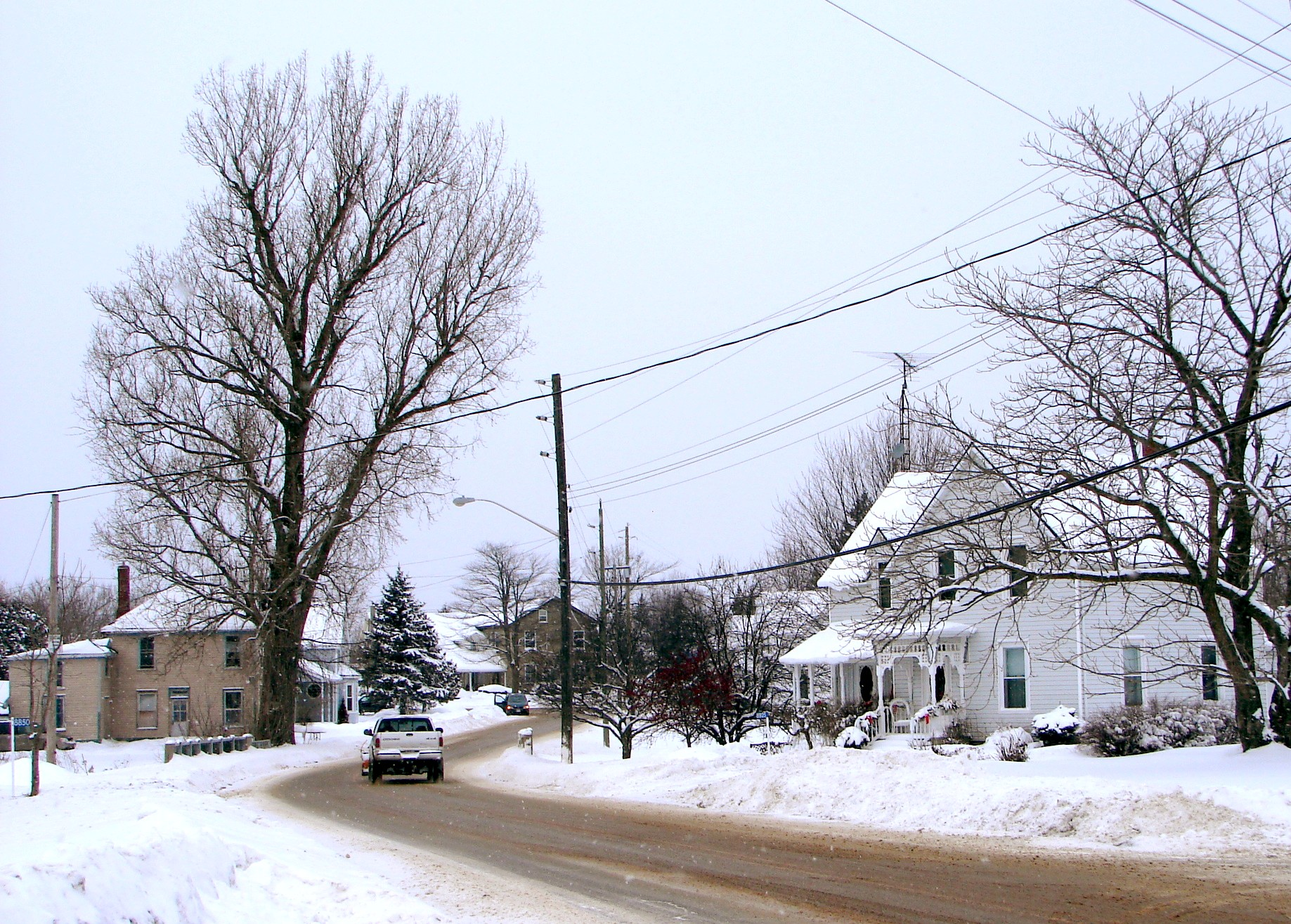
- North Augusta

- Location within United Counties of Leeds and Grenville Location within Southern Ontario
- Coordinates: 44°45′04″N 75°36′01″W
- Country: Canada
- Province: Ontario
- County: Leeds and Grenville

Government
  - Type: Township
  - Mayor: Jeff Shaver
  - Fed. riding: Leeds—Grenville—Thousand Islands and Rideau Lakes
  - Prov. riding: Leeds—Grenville—Thousand Islands and Rideau Lakes

Area
  - Land: 313.77 km^{2} (121.15 sq mi)

Population (2021)
  - Total: 7,386
  - Density: 23.5/km^{2} (61/sq mi)
- Time zone: UTC-5 (EST)
  - Summer (DST): UTC-4 (EDT)
- Area codes: 613, 343
- Website: www.augusta.ca

Augusta Township is a township in the United Counties of Leeds and Grenville, located in eastern Ontario, Canada. Augusta is situated along the St. Lawrence River, and extends back into rural hamlets. The township is located between the city of Brockville to the west, and the town of Prescott to the east.

The hamlets and villages within Augusta were established prior to the 1900s; primarily by the United Empire Loyalists. There are plenty of buildings and homes still standing in the township today that were built by early settlers; many of these historic homes are even still occupied by direct descendants of the first settlers.

In 2013, it was discovered that Samuel Bass, the Canadian abolitionist mentioned in Solomon Northup's 1853 memoir 12 Years a Slave, was from Augusta Township. According to early census records, Bass was born in Augusta in 1807; while here, he married Lydia Catlin Lane, with whom he fathered four children. His wife and children remained in the area, and some of his descendants still reside here to this day. Bass' grandparents were among the first Loyalists to settle in the area, and his parents are buried at Maynard.

== Geography ==
Augusta Township is located within the St. Lawrence Lowlands region; its southernmost boundary is the shoreline of the St. Lawrence River. Much of the area is situated on top of large layers of limestone and grey sandstone, which formed between 500 and 75 million years ago during the Paleozoic era and the Ordovician period. There is not much known about the period directly following the Ordovician period except that there were long periods of erosion followed by marine invasions. The last glaciation occurred around one million years ago which was responsible for many of the present-day landscape features. During this glaciation the entire area of what would become Augusta was covered in a sheet of ice around two to three miles in thickness. This ice sheet melted around 12,000 years ago as a result of climatic changes. A few thousand years after it melted the Ottawa—St. Lawrence Valley was flooded by an arm of the Atlantic Ocean to a depth of around 120 metres (400 ft); geologists refer to this flooding as the Champlain Sea. The retreat of the Champlain Sea around 9,500 years ago left excessive stone surfaces in many areas. The bedrock and boulder clay in the eastern portion of the township are covered by beds of sand which are likely glacial-fluvial in origin; before the forest could take root many dunes were formed just north of the town of Prescott. The area has many pockets of clay and peat around the banks of the South Nation River and the South Kemptville Creek.

=== Topography ===
The township of Augusta is situated at the confluence of three distinct physiographic regions: the Glengarry till plain, the Smiths Falls limestone plain and the Edwardsburgh sand plain. The limestone plain accounts for around 50% of the townships total area. This area is level with a thin covering of soil, less than a foot in depth resulting in limestone outcroppings. The limestone plain supports a hardwood forest with the sugar maple being the most dominant species. Oak and pine are also common in this region as well as elm, ash, soft maple and cedar in the poorly drained areas. This land was not ideal for farming and has remained largely untouched; most of the plain is still covered in peat deposits and forest. The Edwardsburgh sand plain extends into the township from the east. The water table is generally situated close to the surface in this plain resulting in shallow bogs. Most of the area has been cleared, however elm, ash, beech, oak, and soft maple once grew in this region. Today, the area has been somewhat reforested with pine trees, such as in Limerick Forest. The front of the township is covered by the Glengarry till plain, which forms a drainage divide between the St. Lawrence and the Ottawa basins. This till can be described as loamy in texture and stoney. Well drained sections of the Glengarry till plain are suitable for grain crop production.

The soils along the Nation River contain mostly plant matter due to the poor drainage and are therefore of limited use. Another effect of the poor drainage in the region is the formation of large swamps which are common in the township and frequently drained. The soils in the entire township vary greatly due to the fact the township is situated within a variety of physiographical regions; the two most common soils in Augusta are Podzolic and Gleysolic. Podzolic soils are low in fertility and acidic while the Gleysolic soils are high in agricultural value.

=== Climate ===
The climate of Augusta Township is determined by its latitude, however it is influenced heavily by frontal systems which are the result of air masses coming out of the north and south. Westerly winds are the most prevalent wind system affecting the township. Augusta's climate can be described as humid continental with an average temperature range; ranges in temperature go from the average low of −8.4 °C (16.9 °F) to the average high of 20 °C (68 °F). The total average amount of precipitation for the year in the township of Augusta is around 96.8 centimetres (38.1 in) annually. The climate has changed drastically since 1850. From 1550 until 1850 the area was in the grip of a minor ice age; average temperatures were much cooler and there was more precipitation. By 1885, a warming trend began which lasted until the middle of the twentieth century.

== History ==
The township of Augusta was not fully settled until the late 1700s and into the early 1800s, when the Loyalists received their land grants throughout the area and began building homesteads. Most of the residents living in the township today are direct descendants of these Loyalists. Just prior to this in the mid-to-late 1700s, the French had occupied some of the land in the region, including Pointe au Baril in Maitland, Ontario. Before European settlement, many cultures of native individuals briefly occupied the entire region.

=== Prehistoric era ===
The earliest human activity around the region encompassing Augusta township according to archaeologists can be traced back to around 11,000 years ago. During this era, known as the Paleo-Indian period, retreating glaciers exposed inhabitable land for the first time. The cultures which are believed to have inhabited this region during this time are the Clovis people and the Plano people. These cultures left behind very little evidence of their existence; their impact on the area was relatively small as population density was very low. No human remains have survived from this time period meaning we cannot determine the Clovis or Plano's physical appearances. The largest piece of evidence to suggest that these cultures inhabited this region of Eastern Ontario are the numerous stone arrowheads and other weapons discovered in the region which can be attributed to these cultures and dated to the era. The Clovis arrowheads found near the township vary greatly in construction, reflecting centuries of progression and a rapidly changing environment. Earlier arrows were shorter while later Clovis arrows were longer and more spear-like; this is indicative of a mass migration of larger animals into the area.

From 5000 to 1000 BC during the time known as the Archaic period, the entire region of Eastern Ontario was dominated by the Laurentian Archaic people, who were direct descendants of the Plano culture. This culture was far more sophisticated than its ancestors due to the warmer climate and the emergence of modern flora and fauna; polished stone tools were used instead of chipped tools for both hunting and woodworking. Human remains from the Laurentian Archaic culture have survived, and according to archaeologists indicate the culture was both violent and ritualized. Some bodies found from this period were found to have skull fractures, stone projectiles embedded into the bones, or were found to have been decapitated. Other bodies were found to have been sprinkled with red ochre and buried with a wide range of goods seemingly to represent one's status within the culture. Some of the artefacts buried alongside the Laurentian Archaic people are not native to this region, meaning the Laurentian Archaic people must have traded goods with individuals outside of their own culture. It is presumed by archaeologists that the brutalized remains found alongside the ritualized burials are those of outside traders who may have threatened, attacked, or otherwise harmed the Laurentian Archaic people.

Around 500 years ago, the area which would become Augusta Township was inhabited by a St. Lawrence Iroquoian agricultural community with a population of around 1,600 individuals. The main habitation site is located near Indian Creek, slightly north of present-day Roebuck, Ontario. Archaeological excavations conducted at this site suggest that there were around 40 communal longhouses stretching around 30 metres (100 ft) in length within their village. The native Iroquoian farmers grew corn, beans, squash, sunflowers and tobacco. The village located at Roebuck is believed to be similar to Hochelaga, the native village situated in present-day Montreal which was visited by Jacques Cartier in 1535. A second St. Lawrence Iroquoian village, known as the McKeown site (BeFv-1), is located near what is now Maynard.

When the European settlers arrived, the native populations began to decline steadily before all but disappearing from the township. There is some archaeological evidence to suggest survivors of European settlement were absorbed by the Hurons situated along the Trent River system.

=== French period ===
The eighteenth century saw a period of French occupancy in what was to become Augusta Township. The township is conveniently situated along the St. Lawrence River, which was a common trade route at the time; in order to travel from present-day Montreal to Fort Frontenac (now Kingston) one would have to pass through present day Augusta. The French traded with the native populations at various trading posts along the St. Lawrence; valuable furs were exported back to France. The French eventually established a shipyard with the intention of building ships capable of navigating the rapids of the river. The shipyard was located at what the French referred to as Pointe au Baril, which is present day Maitland, Ontario, and had a sheltered bay ideal for their purposes as well as a thick forest of oak and pine that could be harvested for ship building. For protection against the British, the French also established a star-shaped fort at Pointe au Baril. Two ships were built at the French shipyard, Iroquoise and Outouaise, both of which were constructed and launched around 1759. The following year, the French settlement as well as the ships were captured by General Amherst, and the French were forced to leave the settlement. After this, Pointe au Baril was left abandoned for two decades; no attempt was made to colonize the area and the workmen who lived within the fort were weary of both the natives and the British. Upon the arrival of the Loyalists, only one building remained from French occupation, a single log building which had once been the officers quarters. The building was converted into the township's first schoolhouse.

=== Loyalists ===
During the American Revolutionary War, residents of the American colonies were politically divided; many Americans were displeased with the British and striving for their independence from British rule. During this period of political unrest, those who sided with the British were viewed as traitors or rebels, and their opposition was met with violence. Individuals were forced to take sides, as even neutral parties were deemed rebels. Those who remained loyal to the crown were called Loyalists. During and after the war, the Loyalists were essentially pushed out of present-day America for their opposing views and left destitute with nowhere to go; they then turned to the British for relief. Initially, the Loyalists were hopeful that Britain would be able to successfully negotiate with the rebelling colonies, and that their land, homes, and possessions would be returned to them. No such negotiations ever occurred and with the end of the war military payouts were dwindling. New laws were passed in New York state which allowed the Loyalists' property to be officially seized, and threats were made on the lives of Loyalists who may try to return. The Loyalists had no other option but to rely on the British and return to present-day Augusta and the neighbouring townships.

Britain's solution to the widespread poverty and homelessness was to provide the Loyalists with land grants which could be used to build new settlements and start over. These grants were also looked at as a reward for the men's loyalty to the crown. Originally, areas of Quebec were considered for division and distribution to the Loyalists; Quebec feared that the Loyalists would affect the area negatively, and could bring diseases such as measles into their community therefore the idea was abandoned. Major Samuel Holland, surveyor-general of Quebec was put in charge of surveying lands west of Quebec and assess their suitability for settlement. In 1783, Holland declared the land to be more than adequate for Loyalist settlements. The only remaining obstacle in the way of the Loyalists' land grants was the native population of Augusta; Britain would have to consider their land ownership when dividing the land. A man named Sir John Johnson was instructed to inquire as to which lands belonged to the native communities, and to purchase any land that they claimed as theirs. Captain Justus Sherwood, who remained in the area, was employed to provide a detailed survey of Augusta and the surrounding townships.

By 1784, the Loyalists were becoming increasingly restless and began to petition the government for relief from their dire situation; they were scheduled to be settled for the Spring of 1784. The long waiting period to be settled was due in part to the fact the government knew they would need to provide the Loyalists with some tools and supplies in order for them to sustain themselves. The government intended to provide each settler with some seeds and livestock to begin farming, as well as a few essential tools such as axes, knives and hoes. Carpentry and blacksmithing tools were also to be distributed to be shared amongst groups of settlers. The land grants were to be granted based on military position and rank.

By the spring of 1784, supplies had been gathered and the land had been surveyed in detail and divided into lots to be drawn for. Batteaux and provisions were ready to be transported along with the Loyalist settlers to the new settlements. The area surrounding present-day Augusta Township was divided into two ranges of townships, the first of which being called the Royal Townships. There are seven Royal Townships, Augusta being the seventh and titled Royal Township Number Seven. Eventually, the townships were named, Augusta being named Princess Augusta after the third daughter of King George III. It was said that she was "not particularly thrilled" by the idea of this township, which was mostly empty wilderness, being named after her. In June 1784, the Loyalists finally embarked from Quebec down the St. Lawrence River to their new settlements; Edward Jessup's Corps were to be the first settlers of the new Royal Township.

== Communities ==
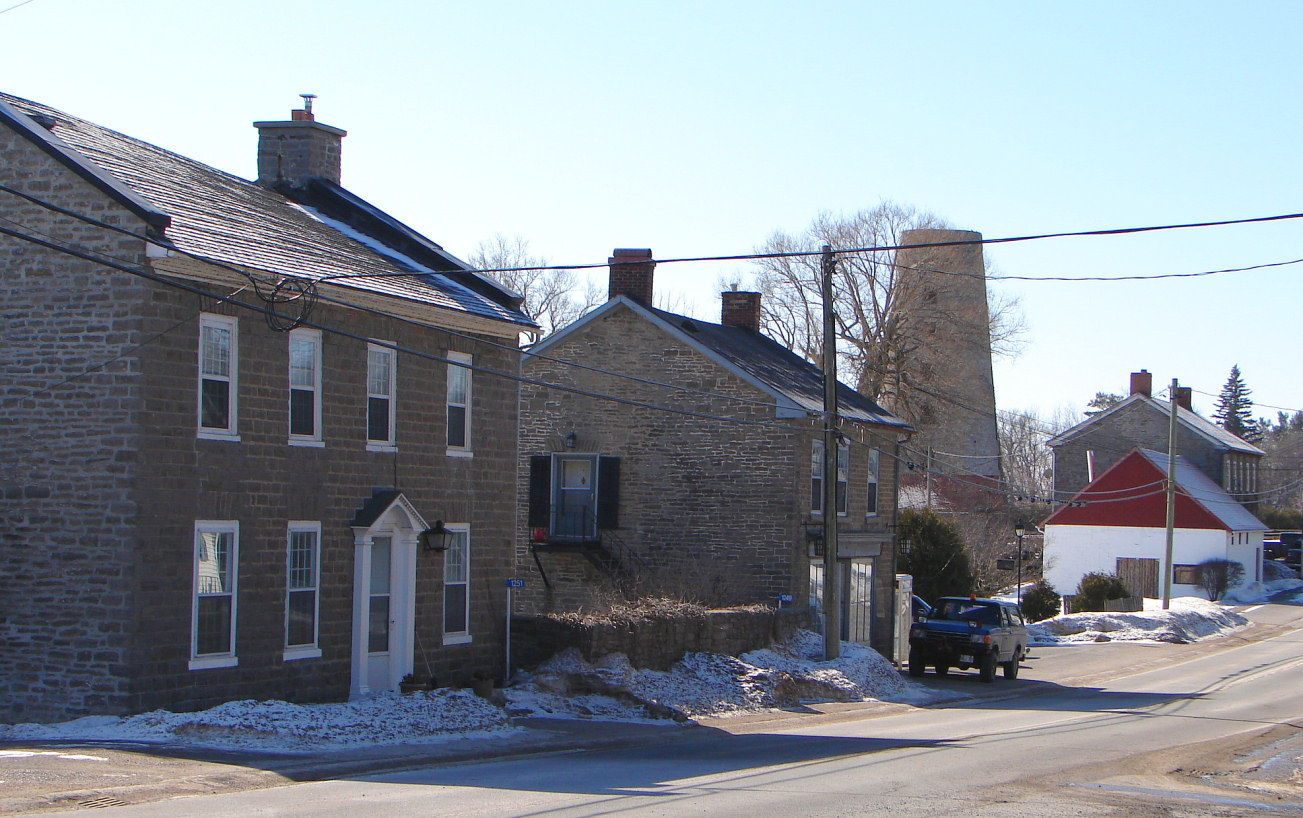
Maitland, Ontario

The township comprises the communities of Algonquin, Bisseltown, Blue Church, Centre Augusta, Charleville, Domville, Garretton, Glenmore, Herron's Corners, Limerick Forest, Lords Mills, Maitland, Maynard, McLeanville, McRobert's Corner, North Augusta, Perrin's Corners, Riverview Heights, Roebuck, South Augusta, South Branch, Sparkle City, Stone's Corners and Throoptown.

Prior to 1834, Prescott was considered a part of Augusta Township; the town became a police village in that year and severed its ties with Augusta. By 1849, Prescott officially became a separated town with its own mayor and council, which it remains today.

The township administrative offices are located in Maynard.

=== Algonquin ===
Algonquin is a small rural hamlet located north of Maitland. Its centre location is the intersection of Algonquin Road and County Road 15, however the area which is considered the community Algonquin stretches from the fourth to the seventh concessions. In the early 1800s, the village was referred to as Wright's Corners after the Wright family, who owned the majority of the land there at the time after receiving it as grants. The Wrights were a wealthy loyalist family, who were prolific within the community; they ran an inn, and were noted to have paid the teachers in Augusta their salaries, as well as workers from the Algonquin cheese factory. By the 1860s the hamlet was formally listed as Algonquin, according to post office records.

In the beginning of the 1800s, a military route was surveyed from Maitland to the Rideau water-way. This resulted in more traffic passing through the area of Algonquin, and allowed the village to prosper. Around this time an inn was established by the Wright family to accommodate overnight guests who were travelling by stagecoach. Mail was delivered three times a week from Maitland at this time. By the middle of the century many businesses had opened in Algonquin to accompany the inn. A grocery store, blacksmith, cooperage shop, butcher, wagon making business and a Methodist church are among those listed as being in operation at this time. Additionally, the community opened its own post office around this time. Late into the 1800s Algonquin was at its most prosperous time; cheese factories and sawmills were in full operation as well as the local businesses.

Like every other community, Algonquin had its own one-room schoolhouse referred to as S.S #11 Algonquin School. The first record of the school indicated it was a log structure along the fifth concession. This first school was later used as a machine shed by a local man before being burned for charcoal. The second schoolhouse was erected in 1833 and is still standing today. This newer schoolhouse was built from stone and the belfry was constructed in the community by a local and paid for by the pupils at the time. This school remained in operation until the opening of Algonquin Public School in September 1962. The one-room school then became obsolete, except to alleviate overcrowding from the larger, newer public school. Algonquin Public School remained in operation until recently. Students from the area are now transported to neighbouring towns for both elementary and secondary schooling.

Algonquin had at one point three churches to serve its community, the most recent one being Union Grove church. The church was a Wesleyan Methodist church and was built in 1892 along the fifth concession on Lot 25. An early parsonage was located on the same lot; trustees from the Wesleyan Methodist church purchased the five-acre lot in 1841 for one hundred pounds for this intention and held on to the property until 1858. The land was purchased again by trustees on October 31, 1892, for $1 from a Wm. Hornibrook. Shortly after the frame church was erected. Services ran every Tuesday night at this church until its closure in 1925. The structure was later purchased by a local resident who relocated the church across the road from its original location in 1943. The church remains in that location and has since been converted into a private dwelling. The earliest church built in Algonquin was a Baptist church located at the junction of Bisselltown and Maitland roads. The church was built in 1849 according to the date-stone located on its south wall. The church had stained glass windows and a balcony on the inside, originally there was a square tower at the front of the structure with a tall spire. Today, the church has been covered in white stucco and the spire and tower have been removed. The front of the building now has a large garage door as it was used for a brief period in later years as a car garage. The church has previously been used by the township on occasion to store maintenance equipment and is still standing today. The third church standing within Algonquin, Ontario, is the Algonquin United Church. which was built in 1858 according to its date-stone. In 1851 the first talks of building a church began and five years later the land was purchased to begin construction. Upon its construction, it was first referred to as Wright's Corners Church and later Maple Grove Church before becoming Algonquin United Church in the 1880s. The church is a stone building with Gothic style stained glass windows which were apparently a later addition. Algonquin United Church is still in use today.

=== Bisselltown ===
Bisselltown Ontario, is a small community located along Bisselltown Road within Augusta Township. The village was established in 1785 when land was divided amongst the Loyalists; one of them, named David Bissell, and his eleven children settled the area after receiving the land through a land grant. The small community which grew around their homestead became known as Bisselltown. There is little information about what businesses may have existed in Bisselltown during the eighteenth and nineteenth century; due to its proximity to Algonquin it is possible residents simply travelled for services. According to a nineteenth-century map of the area, Bisselltown had an ashery, and a cheese factory was in operation here until 1891 when the building was moved to South Augusta. Bisselltown had its own cemetery located north of the community on Algonquin Road; many members of the Bissell family are buried there.

The community of Bisselltown had a schoolhouse which served as a union school for pupils from both Augusta and the neighbouring township of Elizabethtown. According to a Walling's map from 1861, this log schoolhouse was located on the township border along what is now Algonquin Road. In Augusta, the school was known as S.S. #31 McKinley's School. In 1877, the log structure was replaced by a one-storey red brick building. By 1958, the school had closed due to lack of enrolment and the opening of Algonquin Public School. The building was converted into a private residence before it was destroyed by a fire. The date stone for the school survived and is located in the local historical society's archives.

=== Blue Church ===
Blue Church, Ontario is the name given to the community which surrounds The Blue Church, located at the corner of Blue Church Road and Ontario Highway 2 in Augusta Township. Upon the settlers first arrival in the late 1700s, the area of Blue Church was covered in a large stand of white pine trees. These trees were immediately harvested to be built into ships. In the late 1700s, the site of the Blue Church was already being used as a burial ground. Around 1784, Captain Justus Sherwood created a plan for a new town to be erected on the newly cleared land surrounding the burial ground; the town was to be called New Oswegatchie. In 1790, Augusta and its neighbouring townships decided to erect a church alongside the burial grounds which became known as the Blue Church.

The town of New Oswegatchie never materialized, however a small community grew around the church as many settlers built homes surrounding the church and cemetery; the community became known as simply Blue Church. Eventually the town was large enough to support its own post office as well as a small grocery store. The small community consisted of mostly small stone family houses and few businesses; many homes which were once a part of the community of Blue Church were demolished by DuPont Canada. One notable home which was demolished was a large stone house along Ontario Highway 2 just west of the Blue Church which was known as Barbara Heck House. This home was thought by locals and the church to be the house in which she died. Despite protests against its demolition, neither the church or the township had evidence to say she actually died in the house or that the house was historically significant, nor did they have the funding to restore the house. Barbara Heck house was taken apart stone by stone and placed into a barn in the hopes it could later be reassembled. In 1976 a fire broke out in the barn which destroyed the materials beyond repair.

Blue Church was large enough to accommodate its own schoolhouse in the mid-1800s, referred to as S.S. #1 Blue Church School. The first schoolhouse built for the section was located around half a kilometre east of the intersection of Blue Church Road and Ontario Highway 2 and was built of stone. In 1874, a new brick structure was constructed to become the new S.S. #1, located at the corner of Blue Church Road and Ontario Highway 2 directly across from the Blue Church. Due to the school's proximity to the notable burial grounds, the school received many notable visitors including Lord Byng of Vimy. The school closed in 1955, as a newer, modern school opened in Maitland and school sections were phased out. The brick structure still stands and has been converted into a private residence.

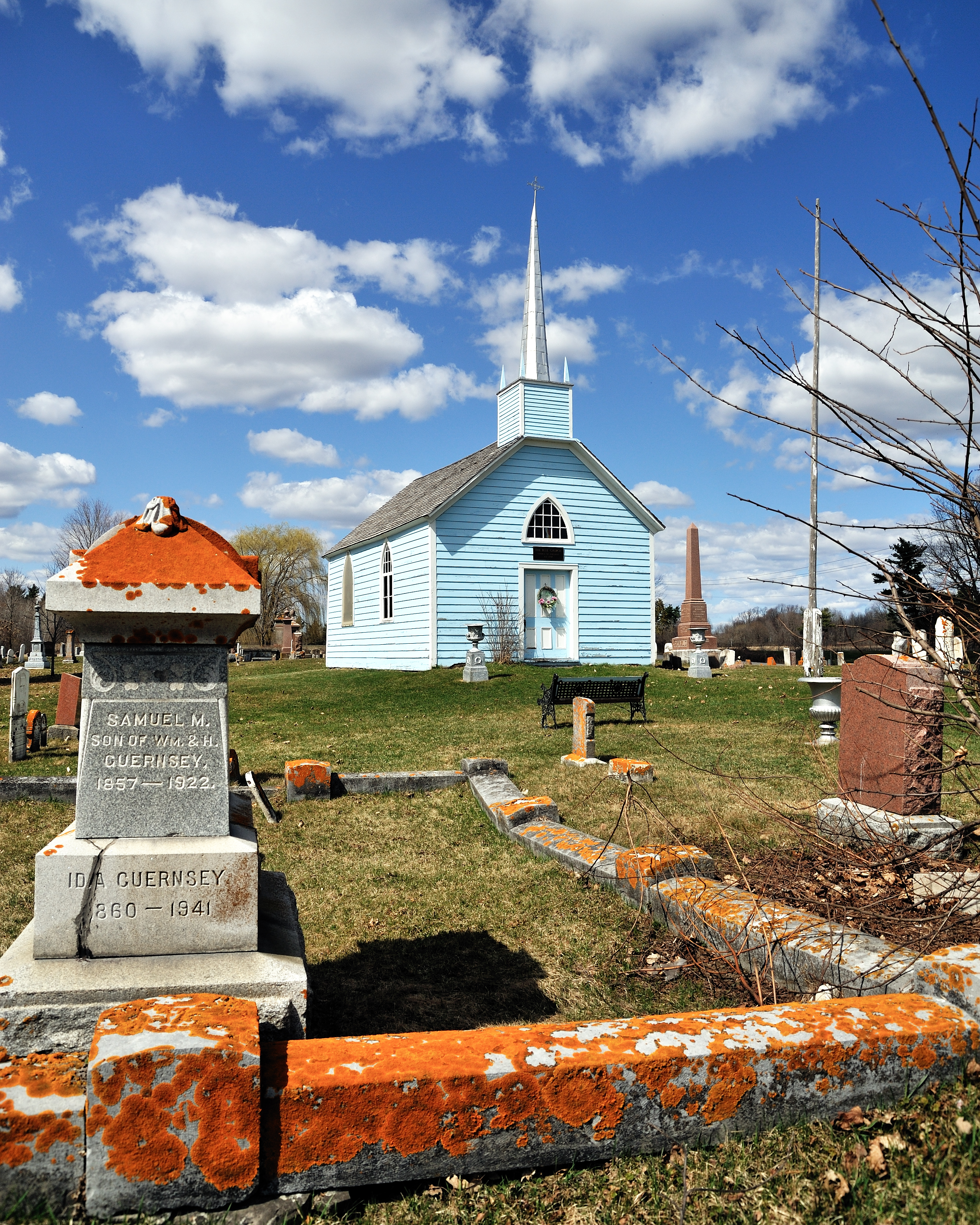
The Blue Church

==== The Blue Church and Burial Grounds ====
On January 1, 1790, the townships of Augusta, Edwardsburgh, and Elizabethtown held a public meeting during which a decision was made to erect a church next to the burial ground at the proposed town of New Oswegatchie. Ten men from the townships were named trustees and required to raise the money to erect a church measuring sixty-two feet by fifty feet by January 1 of the following year. Years later, however, there was still little to no money raised to build a church of this size. It is unclear when exactly the first church was erected at this site; the most conclusive piece of evidence comes from an article from 1870 in a paper called "The Church Herald" which stated "...there was erected somewhere about 1809 a frame church, named for the colour it was painted, the Blue Church." This year is presumed accurate as historical records for the community show that a year prior, in 1808, church services were being held out of a local's home and a year after, in 1810, historical records reference a church in the community. Additionally, a paper authored by John Dumbrille in 1888 titled "A Short Sketch of the History of the Church of England in the Township of Augusta" also named 1809 as the year the church was erected. The church is believed to have been painted blue very soon after being built, as the first reference made to the church being blue was in 1822 during a council meeting.

In the 1830s, church records indicate the Blue Church was in disrepair and services seem to have ceased for a period of time. In 1840, the original Blue Church was severely damaged by a fire and then demolished. For five years the lot remained empty until 1845 when a new church was built in its place. The church was built using some of the salvageable materials from the demolished church; during renovations in the 1960s charred timbers were found being used as studs in the newer building's walls. According to the 1851 census, the new blue church was a small frame building capable of holding around 300 people. The primary usage of the new church was to be a mortuary chapel. On April 20, 1903, the Blue Church caught fire a second time, however locals managed to put out the fire before too much damage was caused. The interior of the church was completely unharmed, but the stained glass was damaged in an attempt to salvage church pews and tame the fire, and the front of the building was visibly fire damaged. Present day, the church still stands in the same spot with the burial ground adjacent. The church is still sometimes used for memorial services.

The burial ground at Blue Church is considered historically significant, as many prominent settlers are buried here. The cemetery has been in use since the late 1700s, and was consecrated in 1832; the earliest recorded stone in this cemetery is that of a man named Alpheus Jones who died on April 13, 1793. The Methodist Church of Canada purchased a small area of the burial ground where Barbara Heck, founder of Methodism in Upper Canada, is buried. In June 1909 the Methodist Church erected a large monument at her place of rest in memorial.

=== Centre Augusta ===
Centre Augusta, Ontario is a community located between Charleville and Algonquin, Ontario; as with most settlements from this time there are no definite boundaries. According to historical records such as Lovell's Ontario Gazetteer and Directory, the settlement was once fairly thriving; in 1869 at its height, the population was listed as 200 individuals. Centre Augusta established its own post office by 1854. Walling's maps from the 1860s indicate there were many taverns in Centre Augusta, as well as a sawmill and a pot ashery. By the end of the century, the population had declined to 100 individuals however many businesses were still established within the community. According to the Dominion of Canada's business directories there was a blacksmith, a flour mill, a cheese factory, a shingle factory, two saw mills and a grocer; the post office also remained open.

=== Charleville ===
The village of Charleville, Ontario is located north of Maynard, Ontario along Charleville Road. The name Charleville was inspired by a man named Charles Lane, who was a prominent figure within the community involved in many business affairs. Originally, the settlement was referred to as Sebastopol, which was probably a reference to the Crimean War which was being fought around the time of settlement. The South Nation River bisects the village, which made it an ideal place for erecting early sawmills. Charleville was at one point the home of Canadian abolitionist Samuel Bass and his wife Lydia. At its height in the mid-nineteenth century, Charleville had a population of around 200 people.

Most of the residents living in Charleville during the 1800s earned an income through agriculture, and like the other local communities found hops to be the most profitable crop. According to business directories from this period there were also many small, family owned businesses located within Charleville. At one point, the village contained numerous blacksmiths, wagon makers, dress makers and masons; the area also once had its own slaughterhouse and butcher as well as a cheese factory and general store. By 1853, the community had its own post office established on April 1 of that year; the first postmaster in the area was the community's namesake, Charles Lane.

The Charleville Cheese Factory was constructed in 1881 and was located at the northeast corner of Charleville Road and the Fourth Concession. The building was constructed by a local resident named Rufus Earl who made the first batch of cheese there on May 1, 1881. The factory was set up for the cheesemaker to live on site. From 1881 until the end of the 1920s, the factory had changed hands many times. By the 1930s, the factory was producing both butter and cheese for the local market, however competition and a waning market lead to the factory's closure shortly after. After its closure, the building was sold and later demolished, however the boiler building was salvaged and turned into a private dwelling before it burned to the ground. The spot in which the factory once stood is now the location of a modern home.

In the mid-1800s, residents around the Charleville community petitioned the township council to build their own schoolhouse and become their own school section; eventually, two schools were built which served pupils from Charleville: S.S. #9 Throop's School and S.S. #12 Perrin's School, located in nearby Perrin's Corners. This school was located on the corner of Charleville Road and the Fourth Concession on land purchased from the Throop family, who the school was named after. The first school was built sometime in the early-to-mid 1800s and was replaced in 1876 by a stone structure. By 1958 the building had fallen into disrepair, and was condemned from use. Students were relocated to Maynard Public School. For a period the dilapidated building was used as storage until the back wall completely caved in. The ruins of the schoolhouse remained on site until 1973 when the building was purchased, demolished and replaced with a brick bungalow; no trace of it exists today.

=== Domville ===
Domville, Ontario is a small hamlet located around six kilometres (4 mi) north of the town of Prescott, along County Road 18. The name Domville was first used around the 1870s; prior to this, the community was first referred to as either Henry's Corners or Fell's Corners. Upon the post office being established, residents asked council to come up with a more palatable name for their hamlet; a Royalist named John Dumbrille put forth the name Frogmore, in reference to Frogmore house. This proposed name change offended the residents, who thought Dumbrille had selected the name in regards to the hamlet's proximity to a large swamp. Around 1876, there was still much dispute over the name of the hamlet; church records from that year referred to the hamlet at Nelsonville. Ultimately, the residents chose Dumbrille's second choice, Domville, which was the original spelling of his surname.

The first families to settle in the area were the Fell family and the Henry family, where the name's Fell's Corners and Henry's Corners originate. A small cemetery located within the hamlet contains at least one member of the Fell family, and is dated back as far as 1814; before the Maynard cemetery was erected. By the mid-to-late 19th century, Domville's population was listed as 125 persons; according to census records and newspapers from the time, the hamlet boasted many businesses and successful farmers. By 1885, the community had its own post office established, as well as two general stores, a blacksmith and carriage shop, two churches and a grist mill. Domville was also home to a fairly large cheese factory, which reportedly used the around milk of 600 cows daily to produce their cheese. By the 1890s, more small businesses emerged, including a saw mill, butcher, and shoemaker. Many farmers were successful in growing and selling hops commercially, to nearby breweries. By the 1970s, the post office, cheese factory, and school had all ceased operations. The swamp in Domville was gradually drained, and new homes were built where it once was.

In 1875 a stone schoolhouse was built on donated land, which opened the following year; the school was called S.S. #8 Domville School. This one-room school was built between the fourth and fifth concessions along McCully road, approximately 400 metres (1,300 ft) feet from where an earlier school once stood; the previous school was a primitive, poorly built structure which had essentially begun to collapse and been deemed unsafe. The new, stone structure was built on donated land complete with a stone porch, as well as a woodshed on site; into the 20th century, the school was equipped with new hardwood floors, a wood-burning stove, and a fenced-in playground for the students. During the 1960s the school periodically closed due to lack of enrolment and would re-open as needed to deal with the overflow from Maynard Public School. By the end of the decade, the school had permanently closed and was left abandoned.

The village of Domville at one time had two churches, the Domville United Church and Knapp's Church. Knapp's Church was dedicated on December 22, 1876, and was located on the east side of McCully Road. Little is known about the church other than anecdotal stories from settlers diaries regarding church services and lectures. The land for this church was originally purchased for $5. The church was closed on an unknown date and demolished shortly after. the Domville United Church was constructed in 1876 on the corner of the Fourth Concession and County Road 18. The church is a light brown brick structure with Gothic style windows. At a later time, a recreation hall was attached to the back of the church for Sunday school services and church dinners. In the early 1970s this church closed for a period of time as it was not financially feasible for it to remain open; by 1973 it was purchased by a Greek Orthodox Bishop who converted the church into a Greek Orthodox church. The bishop intended on turning the building into living quarters for nuns, however the building did not meet the township's requirements to be used for this purpose. The church is still standing however it is rarely used.

=== Garretton ===
Garretton, Ontario is a small hamlet located approximately eleven kilometres (7 mi) east of the North Augusta along County Road 18; Garretton is situated within the Rideau River watershed, with the south branch of the Rideau running through the centre of the community. When the land was first settled in the area settlers immediately set up farms along the banks of the river, in between the ninth and tenth concessions; whereas in most other nearby hamlets, lots were placed along the concession lines. The name Garretton came from one of the first settler's, Joseph Garrett, who headed one of the first families to establish themselves along the river there around 1830; his son Nathaniel Garrett was postmaster. In 1849, a French-Canadian man, Sorel Sophy (sometimes recorded as: Soffey), along with his wife and brother packed all their belongings into a canoe, and set out on the Rideau River from the Kemptville area. Their intention was to find a new location to settle; eventually they decided on a piece of land located within Garretton, and built a farm. This led to the trio becoming the first and only people within the area who secured their land through squatter's rights. The hamlet of Garretton was considered to be fairly isolated from other communities; the first roads in the area were old native-American trails, and a corduroy road built by the first settlers along the river.

Garretton is situated along what was once the old stagecoach road between Bishop's Mills and Prescott; it cost 25 cents to travel on this route. In the 1800s, this resulted in Garretton being a thriving community. Garretton had its own post office, as well as a saw mill, cheese factory, general store, brickyard and schoolhouse. Many early settlers to Garretton made a living through farming or agriculture. Hops became a popular cash crop as at the time there were distilleries and breweries located along the St. Lawrence River.

Garretton had enough school aged pupils to support its own schoolhouse and become its own school section. The schoolhouse in Garretton was referred to as S.S. # 21 Garretton School. During the 1800s, the schoolhouse was rebuilt twice. The first school was a log structure located just off of South Branch Road. This structure was primitive and prone to flooding from a nearby creek. To replace this schoolhouse, a new one was built slightly to the north of the previous log structure. This schoolhouse fell into disrepair quickly as well; reportedly, there were large holes in the floor due to rat infestations. The second schoolhouse was demolished and in 1915 a third school was built in its place. The new school cost around $2,700 at the time and is a one-storey frame structure. In the 1960s, the school added an extension to accommodate students from the nearby South Branch school section which had closed. The school closed in 1971 due to the opening of the more modern Maynard Public school which amalgamated the small school sections.

In 1866, an Anglican church was built in Garretton called St. Andrew's Church on land donated by a local man the year prior. The church is a white frame church with a front porch and gothic style stained glass. The original church is still standing, but has been renovated twice since its construction; the original floor which was built by the parishioners is still in the church. Although membership to the church has significantly declined, the building is still sometimes used. Behind the church is St. Andrews Anglican Cemetery which was established a year prior to the church's construction in 1865. The earliest burial took place that same year and was that of Joseph Garrett. The cemetery was still in use as of 1985. Garretton at one time had a Methodist church which was constructed in the late 1800s on the Ninth Concession called Salem Methodist Church. At its height, the church had a congregation of around 40 families and was known for holding oyster dinners. After the church closed, the building was eventually torn down and the timber was used to construct a recreation hall in Bishop's Mills.

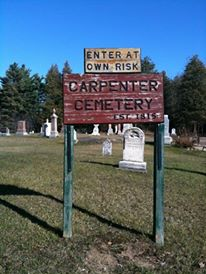
Entrance sign for Carpenter's Cemetery, located in Augusta, Ontario, Canada

=== Glenmore ===
Glenmore, Ontario, is a community located between Charleville and Algonquin, Ontario, and north of Lord's Mills. The community encompasses the area between DeJong Road and Glenmore Road, off of the Sixth Concession. The area was settled as a small agricultural community and was known for its market gardening; prior to 1800, there were already small farms and a sawmill located in the community. The community was, and occasionally still is, referred to as Slab Street due to the amount of lumber production which occurred there in the 1800s.

During the 1800s, the community of Glenmore was fairly prosperous with many businesses operating out of the area. At its height, the community had two saw mills which produced more than enough materials and supplies for the community; there was also a blacksmith, a tannery, ashery, lime kiln, cheese factory and a carpenter's shop, as well as a millinery and dressmaking shop. The community had its own post office for a brief period, opening in 1882 and closing in 1912. Market gardening was a profitable profession for many early residents of the settlement. The area was locally known for its quality vegetables, specializing in onions, potatoes, cabbage, celery and cauliflower. Vegetables grown in Glenmore were recorded as being sold by the truckload in nearby cities such as Ottawa. Glenmore during this period also had its own cemetery.

The first town hall established for Augusta Township was located within the community of Glenmore, situated at the intersection of Algonquin Road and Glenmore Road. The rectangular, stone building was erected in 1858 after a long debate as to where to build the structure. The final building site was chosen due to its centralized location. The building was fully constructed in December 1858 by local men. The hall was used for more than just political purposes, as social gatherings were also held there;. In 1899, the building was used during a smallpox epidemic as a vaccination site. The site eventually fell into disrepair and became too costly to maintain and as a result was closed. Council meetings were held in an old schoolhouse before a new town hall was erected in Maynard in 1968, closer to the front of the township where the population was more dense.

The first schoolhouse in the community was built along Concession 5 in the year 1840. This school was around for many decades before a school inspector declared the building to be unsafe and in need of replacing. When the school was rebuilt, they decided to change locations to the Sixth Concession where most of the pupils lived. The new building was constructed in 1913 and was made of brick; it was a one-storey building with a basement. The new school was called S.S. #13, Union Grove School. The school was closed around the 1960s due to lack of enrolment and was later converted into a home.

Glenmore also had its own Methodist church to serve the community, called Cedar Grove Congregational Methodist Church. It was a frame church built sometime in the late 1800s on Concession 5, Lot 21 on the forced road south of the Sixth Concession. In 1939 the church was moved from its original location to the spot where the Glenmore cheese factory had stood. Just before 1920, the church allegedly became a Standard Church for many years until its closure in 1956. In the 1960s the property was sold for use as a private residence.

=== Herron's Corners ===
Herron's Corners refers to the area surrounding the intersection of County Road 15 and Dixon Road in Augusta Township, Ontario, just south of the village of North Augusta. According to a nineteenth-century map of Augusta, a family with the last name Herron occupied the land at this intersection and are likely responsible for the name of the community. It is unclear what businesses, if any, ever ran within the community however the Herron's Corners was its own school section with a small schoolhouse.

Herron's Corners was known as schools section number 23 and its schoolhouse being named S.S. #23 Herron's School. The first Herron's School was made of stone, and located on the northwest corner of the intersection on donated property around 1855. The schoolhouse burned in 1876 and was replaced the following year by a brick building. The new school was a one-story brick structure with a frame porch and bell tower; the average attendance at the school was only 20 pupils When this school closed, it was used as a private residence until it too was destroyed by fire; currently a modern home stands on the former site.

=== Limerick Forest ===
Limerick Forest, Ontario refers to the 3,200-hectare (8,000-acre) section of forest located in the northeast corner of the township; formerly, there was a small Irish settlement located here called simply Limerick. The Irish settlers arrives from Northern Ireland shortly after the Loyalists in 1840. The area of Limerick Forest was the only land available and not occupied by the British; this was mostly due to the fact the area was sandy and covered in bogs - not ideal for agriculture. The citizens named their new settlement after the county in Ireland in homage to their ancestral home. Other sources point out that Limerick is a county in the south west of Ireland, hence is a very unlikely name to be adopted by settlers from Northern Ireland. Limerick city was a prominent port and departure point for ships bearing impoverished Irish immigrants to Canada.

By the mid-1800s, the community was a fairly thriving farming community. Most farmers grew hops which were sold to Prescott's breweries. It is said that homemade whiskey was a popular commodity in the area during this time, with many families selling it out of their homes.

Around the mid-1800s, Limerick became its own union school section with some students from Oxford-on-Rideau and Edwardsburgh townships attending school at this location for convenience. The school was located at the northeast corner of the community between the ninth and tenth concessions and called S.S. #24 Limerick School. The first schoolhouse was built sometime prior to 1861, as maps from 1861 mention the existence of a schoolhouse at Limerick, however little else is known about this first school. This school was replaced around 1876 by a white frame building built on the same location as the first. Limerick School always had fairly low attendance as the terrain in the area was wet and hard to travel, it was closed in the mid-1900s. In 1964 the building was sold to an Oxford-on-Rideau farmer, then later bought back by Limerick Forest officials who claimed the building was a fire hazard. The building was moved back into the forest and altered with additions added to be used as an office building.

At the start of the twentieth century, Limerick branched off into two small communities, the new community being called Shanty Knoll. Shanty Knoll had its own frame schoolhouse as well as a small church, known as Joe Goodin's Protestant Church. This small community peaked in 1918 before fading from existence; little to no details are known regarding the community or its school and church.

During the Great Depression many of the residents of the community could not afford to hold onto their farms; most of the land and farms which made up the community were sold back to the county. In December 1939, the county of Leeds and Grenville announced they were to plan a community forest surrounding the old settlement of Limerick, to be called Limerick Forest. The plan was to reforest the land which had been cleared by the Irish. 140 hectares (340 acres) were set aside in 1940 to become Limerick Forest. The reforestation effort provided jobs to the surrounding townships. By the 1980s, the forest had grown to 3,200 hectares. Today, Limerick Forest is popular amongst locals for outdoor recreation activities such as snowmobiling or hiking. Most of the old homes and buildings that made up the community were lost when the forest was planted.

=== Lord's Mills ===
Lord's Mills, Ontario, is a small community located along Lord's Mills Road in Augusta Township. Before being settled by Europeans, the location was inhabited by natives; many arrowheads and pieces of pottery attributed to native cultures have been found in the community. When the area was first settled, the community was known as Ireland because of the number of Irish settlers living there. The community became known as Lord's Mills in 1815 after Charles Lord attempted to establish mills in the village. At its height, the village contained a saw and grist mill, a cheese factory, a blacksmith, post office, church, cemetery, general store, temperance hall, Orange Lodge, and school.

In 1815, Charles Lord of Montreal purchased land in Lord's Mills which had previously been a Loyalist land grant property. On this land he intended to build a saw and grist mill using a water wheel for power. The mill was successfully built however the location proved to be a problem; when the water was too low or too high, which happened frequently, the mill could not run. Despite this, it remained in use for five years before Lord decided to improve the mill by erecting a windmill. Only one bushel of corn was ground using the mill before it stopped working due to being surrounded by forest and high land. The building was then sold and converted into a shingle mill. By the mid-to-late 1800s, Lord's Mills was flourishing with the aforementioned businesses and services all in operation. Most residents made a living through farming, growing vegetables, grains and hops as well as raising livestock.

In 1886, land was donated in Lord's Mills to be used for a burial ground and to hold a church to serve the village; this church was called Christ's Church and was of Anglican denomination. The church is a stone structure with a belfry and Gothic-style windows; some windows are stained glass while other are frosted with etched designs. Prior to the churches inception, religious services were held in the schoolhouse or temperance hall. Accompanying this church is a small cemetery, known as Christ's Church Cemetery which was established the same year the church was built in 1886. The first burial took place four years later in 1890.

Although it is unclear when it became so, Lord's Mills was its own school section during the nineteenth and early twentieth centuries with its own schoolhouse. The school was known as S.S. #10 Lord's Mills School. The first S.S. #10 building was located on the same location where the current building sits; it is unclear when this first school was built or why the structure was replaced. In 1916, the frame schoolhouse, which currently still stands, was built to serve as the new Lord's Mills School. Attendance was never high, and the school closed periodically from 1932 until its permanent closure in the 1960s. The building is currently used as a private residence.

=== Maynard ===
Maynard, Ontario, is a small village located northwest of Prescott along County Road 26. The origin of the village's name is obscure as there was no Maynard family located here at the time; local historians trace the name to a story from a Canadian series of school readers from c.1878 which mentioned a John Maynard, a naval officer who died attempting to steer a burning ship to shore. According to the reader, compiled by one J. E Cough, the ship caught fire on Lake Erie, passengers and crew crowded to one end of the ship while Maynard steered it safely to shore. The crew was saved, however Maynard did not survive; to quote the reader "...John Maynard dropped overboard, and his spirit took its flight to his God." Before being called Maynard, the village was referred to as both Heck's Settlement, after the family of Barbara Heck, and Chippenhook after the creek which ran through it. The eastern part of the village, near the intersection of Merwin Lane and County Road 26 was formerly its own small community called Brundage's Corners.

Maynard was settled early in the township's history due to its proximity to the landing points at Johnstown and Blakey's point, located south of the village. Iroquois were living in the settlement prior to this, before being pushed out by European settlements. Farming was the primary industry in the 1800s in Maynard, however many other businesses prospered here at the time. Maynard boasted its own saw and grist mill, tannery, blacksmith shop, churches, cemetery, two schoolhouses, a few cheese factories, temperance hall, post office, general store as well as an inn, located at Brundage's Corners.

During the 1800s and early 1900s, Maynard was divided into two school sections, S.S. #5 and S.S. #7. The schools were both named accordingly, S.S. #5 Dulmage's School and S.S. #7 Brundage's School. Brundage's School is located along County Road 26 at the intersection of Hillbrook Road and Merwin Lane. Brundage's replaced three small log schoolhouses which were scattered around the area, one of which was located on the site of the current structure. This school was open until the 1960s, and was sold in 1970 to be used as a private residence as it remains today. West of Maynard was the other school, Dulmage's School. The first structure was built in the early 1800s and was a stone building, in 1840 it was replaced by a newer one and moved to the north side of the road. It was closed in the 1960s and converted into a home. Both of these schools closed due to the opening of Maynard Public School.

In 1817, Maynard became the site of the township church, known as the Augusta Chapel. This frame church was located on the current site of the Maynard Cemetery. At one time, it was the only church to serve the township. In 1833, the church became a Wesleyan Methodist church, which caused some of the congregation to break off and create their own churches. The frame structure was replaced by a brick building in 1873, which was eventually town down in 1912 after becoming a Baptist church for a period of time. The baptists of Maynard built their own church in the early 1900s, after trustees turned down their offer to buy the old Augusta Chapel. The Baptist church was located across from the cemetery, and was torn down in the 1940s. After the conversion of the Augusta Chapel, one of the churches which was built in opposition was the Victoria United Church in 1833. This small stone church was a Methodist Episcopal church. In 1859, the church was rebuilt to accommodate a larger congregation using the stones from the old church, and new brick. This church is still in use today. The Maynard United Pentecostal church is located at the southern end of Charleville Road in Maynard. This church was built in 1971 to replace the Pentecostal church in Charleville. This church is also still in use.

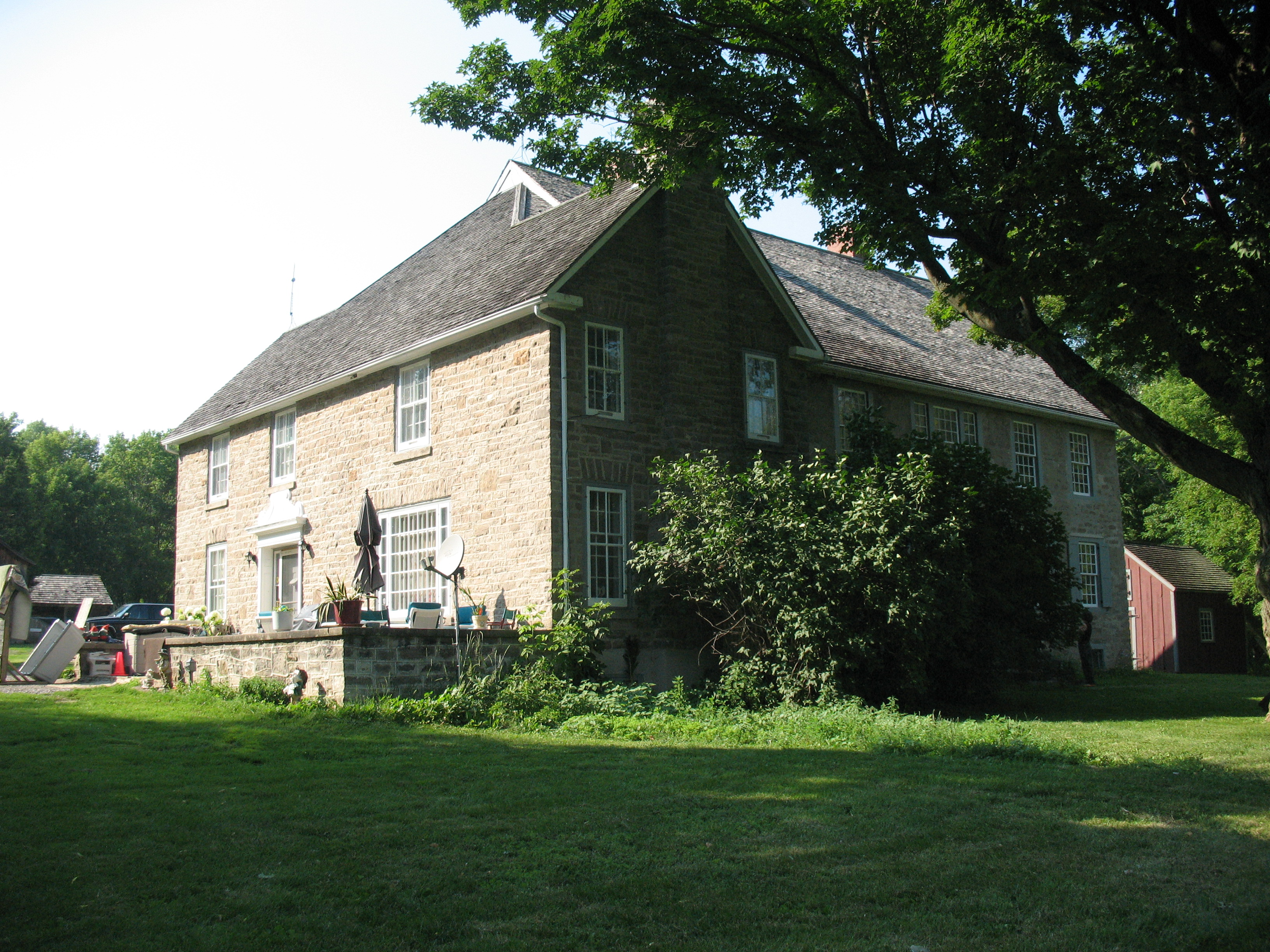
Homewood Museum

=== McLeanville ===
McLeanville, Ontario, is the name given to a small rural area located along McLeanville road off of County Road 21 in Augusta Township. The community presently consists of a few farms and houses but at one point, was a thriving pioneer hamlet with a few businesses such as an ashery, temperance hall, schoolhouse, and church. McLeanville was at its height during the mid-to-late 1800s; at this time, it was large enough to support its own school section. The school was titled S.S. #14 McLeanville school. The school was replaced once; the first structure was stone, and the second building was brick, made in 1885. The school was closed before the 1960s and sold to become a private residence. Later, the building was moved to be incorporated into a local farming complex.

McLeanville had its own Methodist Church located within the community in the late 1800s. Land was purchased for the church around 1890, and the brick church was constructed shortly after but in operation for only briefly before it closed around 1913 for financial reasons. The church was moved to the same local farm as the schoolhouse to be used as an outbuilding.

=== Perrin's Corners ===
Perrin's Corners, Ontario, is the name given to the small community once located at the intersection of the Sixth Concession and Charleville Road. According to nineteenth-century maps, the community once had a temperance hall, cemetery, and a schoolhouse. The community was named for the Perrin family, who first occupied the area; the community mostly consisted of farms. In 1851, trustees in Perrin's Corners petitioned the township to become their own school section. The school and section became known as S.S. #12 Perrin's School. The school is a frame building which was built on land belonging to the Perrin family. The school was closed sometime before the 1950s. The schoolhouse has been renovated many times and is currently a private residence.

=== Roebuck ===
Roebuck, Ontario, is a small hamlet located approximately 13 kilometres (8 mi) north of the St. Lawrence River; its centre location being the intersection of County Roads 18 and 21. The official boundaries of the hamlet are within an approximately 200-metre (660 ft) radius from this intersection. The hamlet is built around what was once the site of an Iroquoian village with a population of around 1,600 villagers. Initially, the hamlet was referred to as Heck's Corners, after the Heck family who established many businesses here in the 19th century. By 1866, postal records indicate the hamlet was officially named Roebuck. The population of Roebuck including the surrounding rural areas was around 300 individuals.

The first recorded settler to the area known as Roebuck was Isaac Jackson, who established his homestead there in 1840; it is believed however that the area was settled much earlier and land ownership never recorded. By the 1860s, the village boasted a sawmill, post office, schoolhouse, general store and a tavern. Many residents at this time sought an income through agriculture, and grew hops to supply local breweries. Roebuck continued to prosper as a village throughout the late 1800s as the distance between the village and neighbouring towns was a fair commute for nineteenth-century farmers, and there was a need to be a self-reliant community. By this time, Roebuck had also established a second general store, a cheese factory, a blacksmith, and a community hall.

The Roebuck Cheese Factory was located on the corner of Forsyth Road and County Road 21. Many communities in the area had their own cheese factories so farmers had a place to sell their excess milk produced from their cattle. The factory was built by a local man on Lot 5, Concession Seven in 1875, just eleven years after the first cheese factory opened in Canada. The Roebuck Cheese Factory was privately owned and operated for 48 years. The hired cheese maker lived on the second floor of the factory. In 1923, the factory became a stock company and was given many upgrades. According to oral history the factory burned down and was repaired or rebuilt three separate times, the last fire occurring in 1931. The factory managed to sell its cheese briefly in the international market and sold both butter and cheese to neighbouring communities. The factory closed in 1965 and was sold a year later to be used as a blacksmithing shop. The last business to run out of the factory building was a welding shop in the mid to late 1980s. The building is still standing but not in good repair.

During the separate school era, Roebuck had its own school section within Augusta Township, but it was a union school with the neighbouring township of Edwardsburgh, and was located almost between the two townships along County Road 21. The school was known in Augusta as S.S. #25 Roebuck School and as S.S. #19 in Edwardsburgh. The building that still stands today was the second school built on the same location and was constructed in 1870. The first school was demolished prior to this as it was in bad repair. The land for the school was donated by Peter Drummond, a man from the neighbouring township of Edwardsburgh. Around 100 pupils attended to school ranging in age from five years to twenty years of age. The school was permanently closed in 1965 when transportation improved and larger schools were built in the more established villages. The schoolhouse was later sold and converted into a private residence.

One of the first churches which served Roebuck was called Drummond's Methodist Church and was located along the border of Augusta and Edwardsburgh townships on property belonging to the Drummond family along County Road 21. The church was commonly referred to as Drummond's Union Sabbath School and remained open for nearly a century before closing due to financial troubles. This church was erected in 1815 and remained there until around 1913. Although the building was demolished, there is a stone monument in its former location which reads "Drummond's Union Sabbath School, 1815-1913". In 1914, a Methodist church was built within the community of Roebuck to replace Drummond's church, which was then known as the Roebuck Methodist Church. When the building was first erected, it was described in a local newspaper as "of a Gothic type, built of concrete, and shingled with galvanized iron." Around this time, land was purchased near the Methodist church for $10 to construct a Presbyterian church. The Roebuck Presbyterian Church was a white, frame structure with a steeple at the front and stained glass windows. The Presbyterian church operated until 1925, when a union between the Presbyterian and Methodist church was formed. Roebuck Methodist Church became Roebuck United Church, and the Presbyterian church was closed and later demolished. Roebuck United Church still stands and still serves the community. Although the interior remains largely unchanged, the outside of the building was covered in stucco in 1961 to prevent further deterioration.

Present day, not many farms or businesses remain in Roebuck, Ontario, but it still has a community hall, which was officially opened in 1975 replacing a small stone structure that had previously served as the community hall. The hall is used for dances, receptions and as a venue for other social events in the township.

=== South Augusta ===
South Augusta, Ontario, refers to an area along County Road 26, in Augusta Township, near Bethel Road. The community was, at its height in the late 1800s and early 1900s, with a few small businesses and farms then operating there. South Augusta was home to a schoolhouse, cheese factory, tannery, temperance hall, grocery store, post office, two churches, and a cemetery. Many residents made a living through farming, and hop and lime kilns were popular in the community. Today, South Augusta is a residential community.

South Augusta had its first schoolhouse constructed in the late 1700s, when settlers first arrived in the area; the building was made of log and was replaced in 1820 by a stone building built upon land donated by the Read family. South Augusta around this time officially became its own school section, with the school being titled S.S. #30 Read's School. This school section was a union section with the neighbouring township of Elizabethtown. In 1877, the building was replaced by another stone structure with a frame bell tower and brick chimney. After the school closed, the building was abandoned for year before being turned into a private residence, as it remains today.

The first church built in South Augusta was built in 1878, and served as a church for both South Augusta and the neighbouring community of Bethel. This church was called Bethel United Church and is still occasionally used today. Originally, this church was a Methodist church. The church is a brick church with Gothic-style windows, and in 1958, an addition was added to the back. The second church in South Augusta was known as St. George's Anglican Church, which was constructed in 1887. The building is made of cut stone, and features a square tower with a belfry and a basement; the windows are made of stained glass. Prior to these churches, it is said in reports from the early nineteenth century that a stone church may have been present in the community in 1811. According to some local history books such as "the History of Leeds and Grenville" by one Thaddeus W. H. Leavitt, locals attempted to build a church themselves during this time, however the walls fell before the church was completed, and it was never established.

=== South Branch ===
South Branch, Ontario is the name given to an area along Branch Road, northeast of North Augusta. According to nineteenth century maps the community had its own schoolhouse and temperance hall, however it mostly consisted of a few farms. According to post office records, the community also had its own post office.

South Branch was at one point during the 19th century, large enough to sustain its own school section. The school located here along South Branch Road was called S.S. # 18 South Branch School. The first schoolhouse was primitive, built in 1845 of grout, mortar cement and gravel and burned in 1881. A year later it was replaced by a brick structure with a frame porch and a small belfry. This school closed in 1963 and the building was later sold for $1 to the church in Garretton to be used as a parish hall.

=== Stone's Corners ===
Stone's Corners, Ontario refers to the area surrounding the intersection of County Roads 26 and 15 west of Maynard.

The area was named after the Stone family, a Loyalist family which first settled here. The community was a small agricultural community; many residents in the nineteenth century made a living selling hops or operation limekilns. At its height, the community had a temperance hall, schoolhouse and church.

Stone's Corners became its own school section during the mid-1800s, the schoolhouse being titled S.S. #6 Stone's Corners. The first S.S. #6 was a stone building located east of the intersection. The first building was replaced due to deterioration and overcrowding; the second building was constructed in 1874, 270 metres (300 yd) west of the old structure. The stone was constructed by locals with stone produced in the community. The school was closed in the mid-1900s due to lack of enrolment, and the building abandoned; in 1973 it was demolished and a bungalow was built on site.

In 1890, a Presbyterian church was built in Stone's Corners. The congregation of this church was formed much earlier, with services being held in the schoolhouse. The church was a white frame building, located on donated land. The church closed in 1957 and was used for meetings of Baptists for a period of time. In the 1970s it was demolished and replaced by a modern home.

In 1977, the community was planned for large-scale development; developers proposed a new town site on the location to be called Stoneacres, Ontario. 800 homes were to be built surrounding the intersection as well as a 14-store shopping complex. In the end, development plans were cancelled for a variety of reasons: the township could not really afford the development, and neighbouring schools and services could not accommodate the influx of people, additionally, it would destroy valuable farm land. Presently, only a few farms and houses make up Stone's Corners. In recent years, the intersection has been known locally for the number of accidents which have taken place there despite the stop signs and flashing red lights.

=== Throoptown ===
Throoptown, Ontario, is the name given to an old community located along County Road 21 at its intersection with Kyle Road east of North Augusta. The village was named after the Throop family who settled there in the 1800s. During the nineteenth century, the population of the community was around 100 people. Today, Throoptown is a rural farming community consisting of residential homes and farms.

In the 19th century, Throoptown was a thriving pioneer community. According to the Dominion of Canada Business directory, during this century Throoptown contained a feed mill, cheese factory, general store, post office, and a shoemaker; the village also had a church, a cemetery, and two schools. In 1840, an inn called the Throoptown Inn operated out of the community. The village also became its own school section at the time, with its schoolhouse being known as S.S. #15 Brown's School. Little records exist except for it being mentioned in a payment record and listed on a 19th-century map. No trace of the building exists today. Additionally, a Roman Catholic separate school operated in the area, the establishment of which was petitioned by the residents of Throoptown. Little is known about the school, and the building no longer stands.

In 1845, a Roman Catholic church, called St. Michael's Church, was erected to serve Throoptown at the corner of Kyle Road. Land was purchased for the church from a local for around five pounds. The structure was built of local stone and plastered over in white sometime later with a square tower topped with a cross at its front. The church was rebuilt once, after a fire caused by lightning severely damaged the building in 1925. The church was rebuilt from mostly the same materials. The new church was renamed St. Theresa's, and a hall, which was formerly part of Wiser's distillery, was added to the grounds. In 1971, the church caught fire a second time and was completely destroyed and this time not rebuilt. The hall was sold around the same time and moved from the location.

In close proximity to where the church was is St. Theresa's Roman Catholic cemetery, which was also formerly called St. Michael's. In 1846, when the land as purchased to become an official cemetery, it had already been used as a burial ground by the community and according to local histories was a native burial place. In 1852, a large cross was placed in the cemetery and remains there. The earliest legible stone in the cemetery belongs to James Delaney, who died in July 1843. This cemetery is still in use.

== Demographics ==
In the 2021 Census of Population conducted by Statistics Canada, Augusta had a population of 7,386 living in 2,952 of its 3,046 total private dwellings, a change of 0.4% from its 2016 population of 7,353. With a land area of 313.77 km^{2} (121.15 sq mi), it had a population density of 23.5/km^{2} (61.0/sq mi) in 2021.

According to 2011 census data, the population of children, individuals who are 0–14 years of age, accounted for 15.2% of the total population of Augusta. 17.4% of the population were aged 65 years or older, and 67.4% of the population consisted of working-aged individuals; ages 15 through 64. The percentages of both working-aged individuals and children are below the national averages, however the percentage of senior residents is above the national average by almost 3%. The median age of 46 in the township is over 5% higher than both the provincial and national median ages.

Canada census – Augusta community profile

	2021	2016	2011
Population	7,386 (+0.4% from 2016)	7353 (-1.0% from 2011)	7430 (-1.1% from 2006)
Land area	313.77 km^{2} (121.15 sq mi)	314.66 km^{2} (121.49 sq mi)	314.73 km^{2} (121.52 sq mi)
Population density	23.5/km^{2} (61/sq mi)	23.4/km^{2} (61/sq mi)	23.6/km^{2} (61/sq mi)
Median age	49.2 (M: 48.8, F: 50.0)	48.2 (M: 47.8, F: 48.7)
Private dwellings	3,046 (total) 2,952 (occupied)	3,004 (total)	2,921 (total)
Median household income	$96,000	$78,778

References: 2021 2016 2011

Historical census populations – Augusta, Ontario

Year	Pop.	±%
1871	5,163	—
1881	5,096	−1.3%
1891	4,534	−11.0%
1901	4,166	−8.1%
1911	3,390	−18.6%
1921	3,095	−8.7%
1931	2,899	−6.3%
1941	2,777	−4.2%

Year	Pop.	±%
1951	3,023	+8.9%
1956	4,023	+33.1%
1961	4,915	+22.2%
1966	5,231	+6.4%
1971	5,540	+5.9%
1976	6,173	+11.4%
1981	6,656	+7.8%
1986	6,846	+2.9%

Year	Pop.	±%
1991	7,176	+4.8%
1996	7,626	+6.3%
2001	7,635	+0.1%
2006	7,510	−1.6%
2011	7,430	−1.1%
2016	7,353	−1.0%
2021	7,386	+0.4%

Source: Statistics Canada

=== Race, ethnicity and language ===
According to NHS data, in 2011 foreign-born immigrants accounted for only 8.5% of the total population, while 91.5% were Canadian-born. The percentage of foreign-born immigrants in Augusta is 20% lower than the provincial percentage of 28.5%. There were no non-permanent residents reported in the township. 8% of the immigrants accounted for were recent immigrants, having landed between 2006 and 2011; the most common country of origin being the Netherlands or the United Kingdom. In 2011, 92.8% spoke an official language (English and/or French) at home; the most frequently reported non-official language by recent immigrants was Tagalog.

In 2011, an estimated 70 individuals, or 0.9% of the total population of Augusta were considered visible minorities; 25% below the provincial percentage. The largest minority group being of Filipino or South Asian descent. The most frequently cited ethnic origins of Augusta's populace were solely, or a combination of: Canadian, English and Irish.

=== Labour and income ===
In 2011, Augusta Township had a labour force of 4,140 individuals; 3,885 people were listed as employed while 250 were listed as unemployed. The employment rate was at 61.4% while the unemployment rate was 6.0%. Within the township, 11.2% of the workforce was aged 15–24, and 20.8% were aged 55 to 64. This compares with Ontario at 12.6% and 15.2% respectively. The majority of the workforce is aged 35–54 years, accounting for 49.2% of the workforce.

Labour force status	Count
Total working aged population	6,325
In the labour force	4,140
Employed	3,885
Unemployed	250
Not in the labour force	2,185

Within the township of Augusta, the most common occupations were service support or other service occupations, technical occupations relating to natural or applied sciences, and administrative occupations. The top industries in Augusta according to the 2011 census were: manufacturing, health care and social assistance, and retail trade.

Industry	Count	Percentage
Manufacturing	620	16%
Health care and social assistance	570	14.7%
Retail trade	545	14%

In the year 2011, 0.4% of Augusta's commuters used some form of public transit to get to their workplace, which is a low number when compared to the rest of Ontario. 90.4% of the population of commuters used their own car or vehicle to get to work, and 5.7% reported being a passenger in a car or vehicle for their commute. The average commuting time for those working out of Augusta Township is 22.1 minutes, slightly lower than the provincial average. 82.5% reported working at their regular workplace, 9.5% reported working from home and 7.7% had no fixed work address.

Class of Worker	Count	Percentage
Total employed	3,885	100.0%
Employee	3,460	89.1%
Total—self-employed	430	11.1%
Self-employed (incorporated or unincorporated)	420	10.8%
Unpaid family worker	10	0.3%

In the year 2010, 84.8% of Augusta's total income was market income, with 81.9% of that coming from employment income. 15.2% of the income was composed of government transfer payments, mostly from the Canadian Pension Plan. 21.6% of the population of Augusta Township reported having no income or an income of less than $12,025 per year. 50.1% of Augusta's population had a household income of $27,815 or higher.

=== Religious demographics ===
National Household Survey data from 2011 states that 84.7% of the population of Augusta associated themselves with a religion; leaving only 15.3% of the population unaffiliated with any religious denomination. The most common religion stated was with the United Church, second most common being both Anglican and Roman Catholic. In contrast, statistics for the rest of Ontario report that Roman Catholic is the most frequently reported religion in the Province; the United church being the second most frequent and Anglican the third.

Religious Affiliation	Count	Percentage
Roman Catholic	1,460	19.8%
United church	1,730	23.4%
Anglican	1,460	19.8%
No religious affiliation	1,130	15.3%

== Cemeteries ==
Augusta Township is home to many small cemeteries, many of which were erected in the 19th century; some are still currently in use. There are also many old, family burial grounds and tiny abandoned cemeteries in the township as well as known native burial grounds. Due to the age of some of the tombstones in the area, they cannot properly be transcribed. Early cemetery records obtained by the Grenville Historical Society have only given moderate insight into the area's first cemeteries that are unmarked, or completely destroyed/illegible. It is strongly believed that the township is home to many more family burial plots, which were never recorded, and the whereabouts remain unknown. The Ontario Cemeteries Act requires all of the known cemeteries and burial ground in Augusta to receive minimum care, if not already being attended to by any person or organization. As a result of strict funding in regards to Cemetery Boards and care, most of the responsibility of preserving centuries-old burial grounds falls directly onto local volunteers. So far, volunteers have succeeded in transcribing every legible stone in the township. In addition to the pioneer and family burial grounds, there are many denominational cemeteries within the communities of Augusta which have been mentioned in the previous sections.

The following is a list of all the known cemeteries located within the township of Augusta, including family burial plots:

- Kingston Cemetery
- Bissell Cemetery
- Carpenter Cemetery
- Lords Mills Cemetery
- Blue Church Cemetery
- Maynard Cemetery
- Reynold's Cemetery
- Read's Cemetery
- Fell Cemetery
- Durham Cemetery
- Jones Burying Ground
- McGuin Cemetery
- St. Andrew's Anglican (Garretton)
- St. Peter's Anglican (North Augusta)
- Sandy Hill United
- North Augusta Presbyterian Cemetery
- St. Theresa's Roman Catholic Cemetery (Throoptown)
- Roebuck Native American Burial Ground
- Mosher Burial Ground

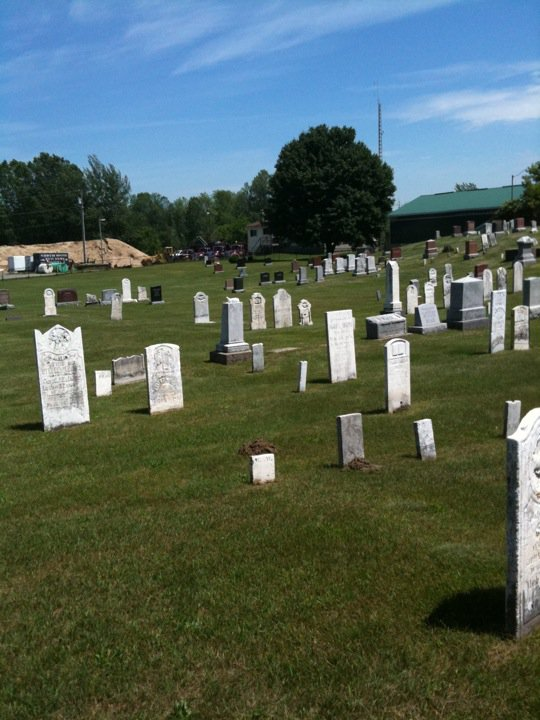
Read's Cemetery, Augusta

=== Pioneer cemeteries ===
Bissell Cemetery is located along the Fifth Concession on Lot 34 near Algonquin, Ontario. The cemetery occupies a space of around a quarter acre and is currently operated and maintained by a board of trustees. The property on which the cemetery stands was originally a Crown Grant to a David Bissell, and officially became a cemetery in 1886. Burials took place here prior to this, however, with the earliest stone belonging to a Zenas Bissell, who died in 1853.

Carpenter's Cemetery is a pioneer cemetery located on the Fifth Concession on Lot 36 which was established in 1815. The property was originally a Crown Grant to Isaiah Carpenter, whose tombstone is also the oldest readable stone in the cemetery, dated November 16, 1815. There are possibly older burials in this cemetery, as some graves are only marked with fieldstones and other and illegible.

The Maynard Cemetery located on County Road 26, although purchased by Methodists and still in use, began as a pioneer cemetery. The earliest legible inscription is from 1814 and reads " Ruth dau. of Joseph and Louisa Scott who died Aug. 1, 1814 aged 16 y. 5 m."; there are possibly earlier burials, as some graves were only every marked with fieldstones if at all. By 1817 the property had been purchased by the Methodist church in order to officially become a cemetery with more land being purchased in 1848. Maynard Cemetery is currently maintained by a board of trustees.

Read's Cemetery is located on Bethel Road just off of County Road 26 in Bethel, Ontario. Read's Cemetery was in use very early as the sign for the cemetery was erected in 1800. The cemetery's oldest readable stone belongs to Moses Read who died in 1802; there are many weathered stones in the cemetery that were once used as markers for older graves. This cemetery is located between two properties, which used to belong to the Row and the Read families who donated the land for the cemetery. The iron fence surrounding the graveyard was erected in 1918 and was built by local individuals who canvassed the money for the build. Read's Cemetery is currently looked after by a board of trustees.

=== Native burial grounds ===
In Roebuck, there is a historical plaque located on County Road 21 which honours the site of an Iroquoian village. This plaque also marks the site of a 500-year-old burial ground which was excavated in the 20th century. In total, 120 skeletons were excavated from the site; 85 of the skeletons belonging to Iroquoian villagers, and 35 of the skeletons, which were buried further away from the others, were from outsiders. When the remains were studied, it was determined the first set of 85 skeletons were villagers, due to the fact the skeletons were relatively intact, and nicely buried; some skeletons were even buried in pairs. The group of 35 skeletons was determined to be the bones of captives or enemies of the tribe, with only a slight possibility of the remains being those of Iroquoian people. This conclusion was made after archaeologists ruled at least 31 of the 34 skeletons recovered belonged to young men; in contrast to the former group of remains which contained a mixed demographic in regards to age and gender. The latter group of 35 skeletons were also found disarticulated or fragmented; and many proven to be victims of cannibalism.

=== Private and family cemeteries ===
There are many known private, family cemeteries located within the township of Augusta. These cemeteries are mostly located on private property and were mostly once small family plots from a time when it was common to bury family on the property. Most of these cemeteries are not accessible to the public and are abandoned.

Durham Cemetery is located on the first concession, Lot 36 on property which was received as a Crown Grant by a Loyalist name Daniel Durham. Only one stone from this burial site exists, however it is located elsewhere. Allegedly, the burial ground was converted into a pig sty by a later property owner and the other tombstones lost. The individuals buried in this cemetery are mostly members of the Durham family.

Fell Cemetery is an old burying ground located near Domville, at the intersection of Maple Avenue and County Road 18. One tombstone has been recovered from the property, the inscription simply reading "B. Fell D 11 A 1819"; it is unknown whether or not any other tombstones ever existed here, however fieldstones once marked the place of the graves. It is presumed the rest of the individuals buried here are members of the Fell family, as the property was a Crown Grant to a man named Frederick Fell in 1804.

The Jones Burying Ground is located on property once belonging to Solomon Jones and his descendants. At least four broken, marble tombstones were recovered on the Jones' properties by archaeologists which are now preserved at the Homewood Museum.

Kingston Cemetery is located at the intersection of Charleville Road and the Sixth Concession on property which once belonged to the Kingston family in the mid-1800s. Kingston Cemetery consists of only four tombstones, each a member of the Kingston family.

The Mosher Burying Ground is a small family cemetery located north of the bottom section of Merwin Lane, where it splits of towards the west. Little is known about the origins of the cemetery; no tombstones were present, just fieldstones marking the graves. These stones were later moved when the road was widened leaving no trace of the cemetery. Locals referred to the burial ground and surrounding area as "Spook Hill" due to local lore about paranormal sightings in the area.

McGuin Cemetery is located on private property along the Sixth Concession on Lot 19. The property was originally a grant to Edward Jackson and was sold several times before becoming the property of the McGuin family in 1872. The first burial took place in 1812, making it one of the earlier pioneer cemeteries in the area. The last known burial took place here in 1949 and the cemetery has since been largely abandoned.

There is a small private cemetery located just north of Garretton along Cooper Road called Reynolds' Cemetery. Around five different family names can be found in this cemetery; the last burial took place here in 1971.

== Education ==
=== History ===
The earliest known school established in Augusta was the Johnstown Grammar School which stood in Maitland. It was a simple log-structure, built around 1788, and was probably the only school in the area at that time. Even into the 19th century, the farming families in the predominantly rural township saw little value in formal education. A child's primary responsibilities involved their family and farm, therefore the few pupils enrolled in the few schools that existed at the time attended sporadically, as their responsibilities allowed. Aside from the general apathy surrounding schools at the time, financial restrictions also hindered the establishment of a formal education system; even when a primitive schoolhouse managed to be built, there was little or no money for teachers' salaries or the appropriate texts and classroom instruments. These early schoolhouses were simple, log structures, built by volunteer farm labourers and made mostly with what they could find for free; these structures lacked basic necessities, such as toilets and floors, and often had holes which were patched with moss and dirt.

In 1816, The Common Schools Act came into effect in Upper Canada; this Act called for the distribution £25 grants to pay each teacher's wages, and for the township to be divided into school sections. The sections were to be determined based upon the locations in which approximately 20 pupils could easily congregate. Although the Act provided some improvement for the area, there was no financial aid for building materials or classroom materials thus the grants provided little encouragement for the settlers to establish schools. It was not until the mid-1800s that substantial progress was made in regards to education in Augusta Township. By 1844, the township had been successfully divided into 22 school sections, as well as 5 part-sections, which were union sections with neighbouring townships with pupils from multiple townships. The original sections and schools were as follows:

- S.S #1, Blue Church
- S.S #2, Haley's
- S.S #3, Maitland
- S.S #4, Gosford — union
- S.S #5, Dulmage's
- S.S #6, Stone's
- S.S #7, Brundage's
- S.S #8, Domville
- S.S #9, Throop's
- S.S #10, Lord's Mills
- S.S #11, Algonquin
- S.S #12, Perrin's
- S.S #13, Union Grove
- S.S #14, McLeanville
- S.S #15, Brown's
- S.S #16, unknown name
- S.S #17, North Augusta
- S.S #18, South Branch
- S.S #19, Peppers
- S.S #20, Land O' Nod
- S.S #21, Garretton
- S.S #22, unknown name
- S.S #23, Heron's
- S.S #24, Limerick
- S.S #25, Roebuck
- S.S #29, unknown name
- S.S #30, Read's—union
- S.S #31, McKinley's—union
- S.S #32, unknown name.

Each section had its own schoolhouse, usually made from locally quarried stone and built by the local families. These one-room schoolhouses were used in the area until around the 1950s when the one-room separate schools and school sections were largely phased out. Many of the old schoolhouses still stand and have since been converted into private residences. S.S. #22, #29, and #32 were planned sections which never developed; it is unclear why there are no school sections 26–28. S.S. #16 was an apparently unnamed section located on Merwin Lane. This school was built of log and was open until 1872 when it was amalgamated with Brundage's School; ruins of this log structure existed into the early 1900s. S.S. #19 Pepper's School was a small section between North Augusta and Garretton with almost no records of its existence other than its appearance on Walling's 1861 maps. S.S. #15 Brown's School was the separate school for the community of Throoptown but few records exist regarding this school aside from a few payment records made out to it; additionally, there was a Roman Catholic separate school located in Throoptown.

During the 1950s and 60s as transportation improved larger public schools were built in centralized locations to amalgamate the pupils from the smaller schools. These larger schools were far more modern than the previous schoolhouses; during this period a handful of these larger schools were built in the township, only one of which is still in operation. In 1955, Churchill Public School opened at the southern end of Merwin Lane in what is now considered the community of Riverview Heights. It was a large brick building with steel framework and contained four classrooms; later a gymnasium and kitchen were added onto the school. This school amalgamated the Blue Church school, Haley's school and the old Maitland school house, all of which were shut down upon its completion. The school closed its doors permanently in 1974. Algonquin Public School was a brick structure located within the village of Algonquin, Ontario. It was the first school in the township to have a gymnasium included in the original plans. The school contained six classrooms and had an average enrolment of 130 pupils. The Algonquin Public School amalgamated Herron's school, Read's school, and the schoolhouses for the communities of Lord's Mills and Algonquin resulting in their closure. Algonquin Public School ceased operations in the 2000s and the building is currently being used as a retirement facility. Maitland Public School was located just west of Maitland Road in Maitland, Ontario. This public school was erected around 1955 and closed in recent history. The building has since been demolished. Maynard Public School was erected in 1958 and is the only public school within the township which is still in operation. Originally, the school contained only six rooms plus a principal's office and a board room before additions were added to the school in 1964, 1967 and 1969 in order to create more classrooms.

Formerly, one private school was once located within the township of Augusta, Grenville Christian College. Located along Ontario Highway 2, the school was first known as St. Mary's Redemptorist College when it first opened in 1920; the original structure took to years to build with construction beginning in 1918. By 1973 The school was sold and became a co-ed private day or boarding school. The school closed in 2007 due to unspecified financial troubles; since its closure, much controversy has surrounded the school. Many students have come forward with allegations of abuse from former staff members.

=== Present day ===
Present day, only one elementary school exists within the boundaries of Augusta township: Maynard Public School located within Maynard, Ontario. Elementary students can either attend school in Maynard or be transported to Prescott or Brockville to attend the elementary schools there. There are no secondary schools within the township; however, secondary schools located in Prescott and Brockville service students living in Augusta Township.

Most common field of study for the adult population with post-secondary certification in Augusta Township
Field of study	Number	Percent
Health professions or related programs	555	17.8%
Business, management, marketing & related support services	500	16.1%
Education	215	6.9%
Mechanic and repair technicians/technologies	215	6.9%
Construction trades	200	6.4%

In 2011, 51.8% of the 5,365 adults over 25 years of age living in Augusta had completed some form of post-secondary education. Of these individuals: 16.9% had obtained a university degree or certificate, 29.4% had obtained college diploma and 11.8% had obtained a trades certificate. A total of 26.1% of adults had achieved a high school education as their highest level of education, and an additional 15.8% of adults had completed neither their secondary nor post-secondary education. The most common field of study amongst adults in the township is health-related professions.

== Notable people ==
- Barbara Heck (1734–1804), early Methodist
- Samuel Bass (1807–1853), abolitionist who helped Solomon Northup regain freedom

== See also ==
- List of municipalities in Ontario
- List of townships in Ontario
- Royal eponyms in Canada
- Upper Canada
- Grenville County
- Leeds and Grenville County
- North Augusta, Ontario
- Maitland, Ontario
