= Rideau Canal Celtic Cross =

Memorial in Ottawa, Ontario, Canada

Coordinates: 45.42673°N 75.69804°W

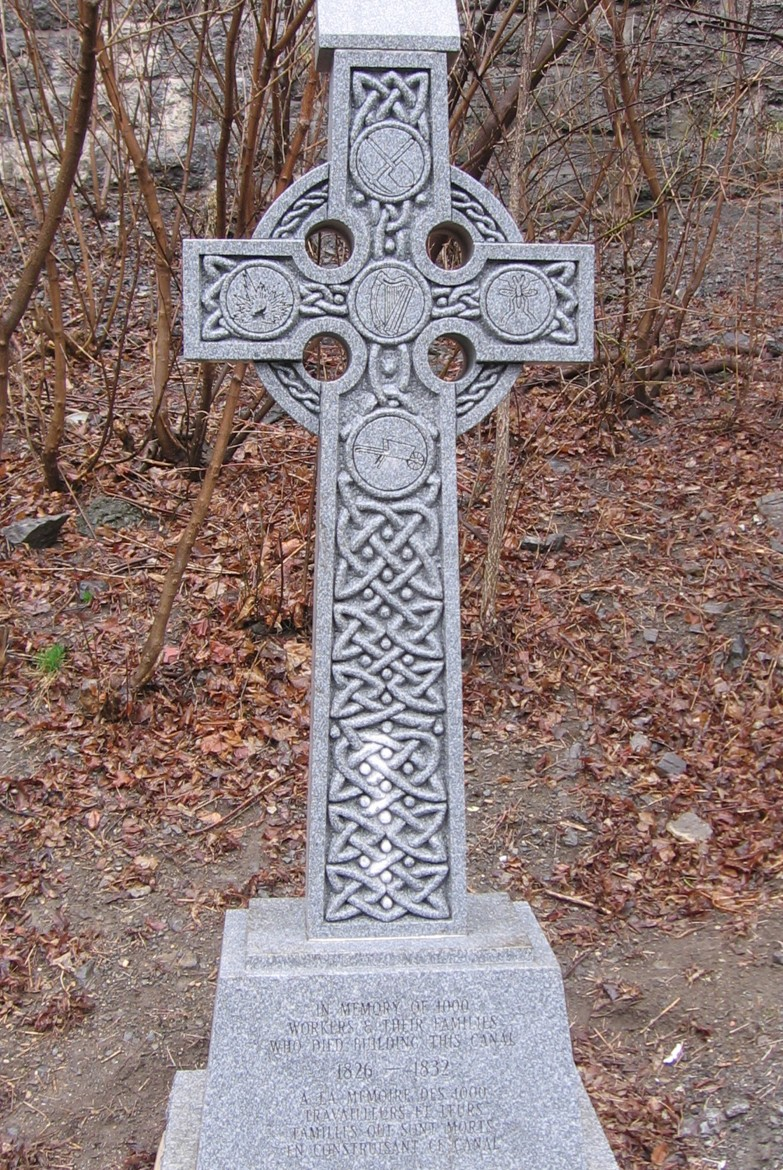
The monument unveiled June 27, 2004 next to the Rideau Canal in Ottawa

The Rideau Canal Celtic Cross is a memorial in Ottawa, Ontario, Canada, erected to commemorate the workers and their families that died building the Rideau Canal between 1826 and 1832. The granite Celtic cross has five engraved symbols: an Irish harp; a pick and shovel; a mosquito; a wheel barrow, and an explosion. It is erected close to Lock #1, in the Colonel By Valley, below Major's Hill Park and Château Laurier Hotel. The group of volunteers who erected the cross were drawn together in 2002 by the Ottawa and District Labour Council with the goal of erecting the memorial. The committee included representatives of the Workers Heritage Centre Museum and the Irish Society of the National Capital Region. The group had support from the Kingston Irish Folk Club, which has raised a number of monuments in the Kingston area. Upon the unveiling of the cross at the canal's first lock at the Ottawa River, the committee disbanded.
