= Rideau Ferry =

Community in Eastern Ontario, Canada

- Rural Community
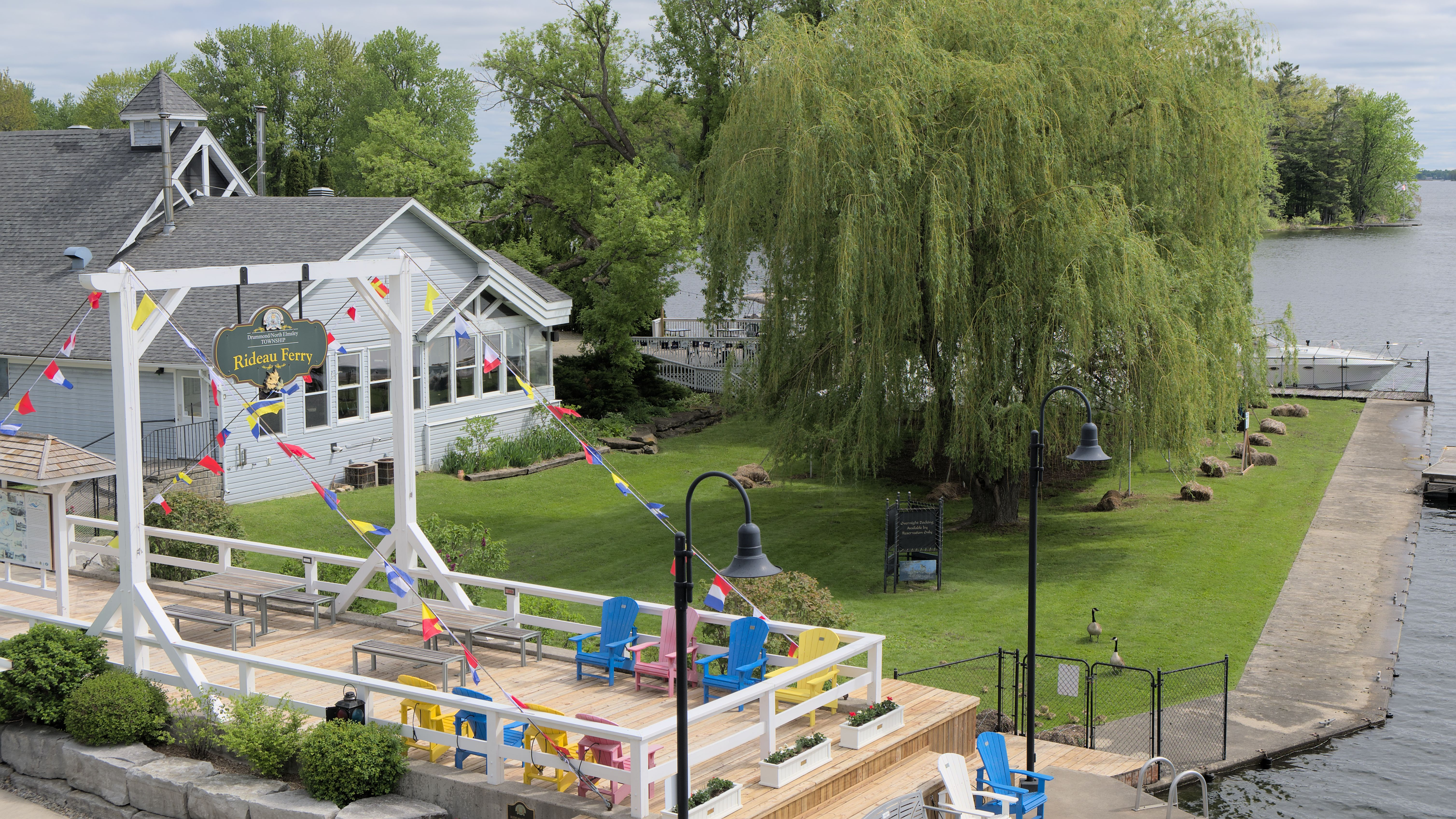
- North shore of Rideau Ferry in Lanark County
- Interactive map of Rideau Ferry
- Coordinates: 44°51′04″N 76°08′29″W
- Country: Canada
- Province: Ontario
- County: Leeds and Grenville, Lanark
- Township: Rideau Lakes, Drummond/North Elmsley
- Time zone: UTC-5 (Eastern (EST))
- Postal Code FSA: K0G, K7H
- Area codes: 613

Rideau Ferry is a small community in Eastern Ontario, Canada, along the Rideau Waterway. Rideau Ferry straddles a narrow stretch of water joining the Big Rideau Lake to the Lower Rideau Lake. At Rideau Ferry, the south shore of the Rideau Waterway is located within the Township of Rideau Lakes in Leeds and Grenville County, and the north shore is located within the township of Drummond/North Elmsley in Lanark County.

== History ==
Despite the name of the community, there is no ferry service operating at Rideau Ferry in the present day. A bridge was constructed to allow passage across the Rideau in 1874, allowing travellers from Brockville or Kingston to more easily cross the Rideau to travel to Perth.

Rideau Ferry was originally known as Oliver's Ferry after John Oliver, a Scottish settler in South Elmsley township (now part of Rideau Lakes), who settled here in 1816 and started a ferry service across this narrow section of Rideau Lake. According to local legend, Mr. Oliver was said to have an unusual habit of refusing to transport passengers after dark, instead putting them up in his house for the night. His neighbours, though, never saw the travellers in the morning. Several of the travellers did not arrive at their intended destination and were thought to be victims of highway robbery. Years later, when Oliver's house was torn down to allow a bridge to be built, human skeletons were found in the walls and under the floorboards of additions Oliver had made to the original house. Although later found to be untrue, this story persists as a local legend.

In the 1890s, a number of summer homes and cottages were established along the south shore of the Lower Rideau Lake, many of which remain with the same families today.

== Services and attractions ==
The Rideau Ferry Conservation Area was established along a 10-acre (40,000 m^{2}) shoreline property on the Lower Rideau Lake. The former Rideau Ferry Yacht Club donated the property in 1976 to provide a public recreation area with access to the lake.

Rideau Ferry is also home to a restaurant, a general store, a motel, a Castle Building Centre, an art studio and a marina.
