= Black Creek (Ontario) =

Black Creek in Ontario may refer to one of 37 creeks of that name:

- In Algoma District:
  - Black Creek, NTS map sheet 041J02
  - Black Creek, NTS map sheet 041J05
  - Black Creek, NTS map sheet 041J07
  - Black Creek, NTS map sheet 041J14
  - Black Creek, NTS map sheet 041K15
- Black Creek in Bruce County, NTS map sheet 041A14
- Black Creek in Dufferin County, NTS map sheet 040P16
- Black Creek in the Regional Municipality of Durham, NTS map sheet 030M15
- Black Creek in Frontenac County, NTS map sheet 031C15
- Black Creek in Haliburton County, NTS map sheet 031D15
- Black Creek in the Regional Municipality of Halton, NTS map sheet 030M12
- Black Creek in Huron County, NTS map sheet 040P05
- In Lambton County:
  - Black Creek, NTS map sheet 031F02
  - Black Creek, NTS map sheet 040J09
- In Lanark County:
  - Black Creek (Big Rideau Lake)
  - Black Creek, CGNDB code FAJFW, near Smith's Falls
  - Black Creek, CGNDB code FAJHV, a tributary of the Clyde River
- Black Creek in Leeds and Grenville United Counties, NTS map sheet 031C08
- Black Creek in Lennox and Addington County, NTS map sheet 031C07
- Black Creek in Manitoulin District, NTS map sheet 041G09, a tributary of Blue Jay Creek
- Black Creek in Muskoka District, NTS map sheet 31000000
- Black Creek in Norfolk County, NTS map sheet 040I16
- Black Creek in Ottawa, NTS map sheet 031G06
- Black Creek in Oxford County, NTS map sheet 040P07
- Black Creek in Parry Sound District, NTS map sheet 041H15
- Black Creek in the Regional Municipality of Peel, NTS map sheet 030M13
- In Perth County:
  - Black Creek, NTS map sheet 040P06
  - Black Creek, NTS map sheet 040P10
- In Prescott and Russell United Counties:
  - Black Creek, NTS map sheet 031G06
  - Black Creek, NTS map sheet 031G07
- Black Creek in Prince Edward County, NTS map sheet 030N14
- In Renfrew County
  - Black Creek, NTS map sheet 031F11
  - Black Creek, NTS map sheet 031L01
- In Stormont, Dundas and Glengarry United Counties:
  - Black Creek, NTS map sheet 031B14
  - Black Creek, NTS map sheet 031G03
- Black Creek in Sudbury District, NTS map sheet 041J01
- Black Creek (Toronto)
- Black Creek in Welland County, NTS map sheet 030L14

== See also ==
- List of rivers of Ontario
