= Rideau Valley Conservation Authority =

Conservation agency in Ontario, Canada

The Rideau Valley Conservation Authority (RVCA) is an inter-municipal environmental protection and advisory agency that works with local municipalities, government agencies, special interest groups and the general public to protect the natural resources of the Rideau River watershed. The watershed drains an area of over 4,000 square kilometres (1,500 sq mi) of eastern Ontario and includes towns such as Portland, Perth, Smith Falls, Merrickville, Kemptville, and Manotick. About 620,000 live in the watershed, mostly deriving from the City of Ottawa. There are 18 municipalities within the valley and most people, outside of Ottawa, draw their drinking water from the river or from groundwater.

The mission of the RVCA is to have clean drinking water, natural shorelines, and sustainable land use throughout the Rideau Valley watershed.

== Rideau Valley Conservation Foundation ==
The RVCA provides office space, staff, and expertise to the Rideau Valley Conservation Foundation (RVCF) and their environmental projects, while managing all of its conservation lands. The RVCF was founded in 1970. It has an active land securement plan and strong track record in managing donated land through agreement with the RVCA. It accepts gifts of land in exchange for a charitable tax receipt for the fair market value of the property in common with groups like the Rideau Waterway Land Trust Foundation, local municipalities and the Nature Conservancy of Canada.

== Conservation areas ==
- Baxter
- Chapman Mills
- Foley Mountain
- Meisel Woods
- Mill Pond
- Motts Mills
- Perth Wildlife Reserve
- Portland Bay
- Richmond
- Rideau Ferry Yacht Club
- W.A. Taylor
