= Kilmorie house =

Coordinates: 45.35506°N 75.73943°W

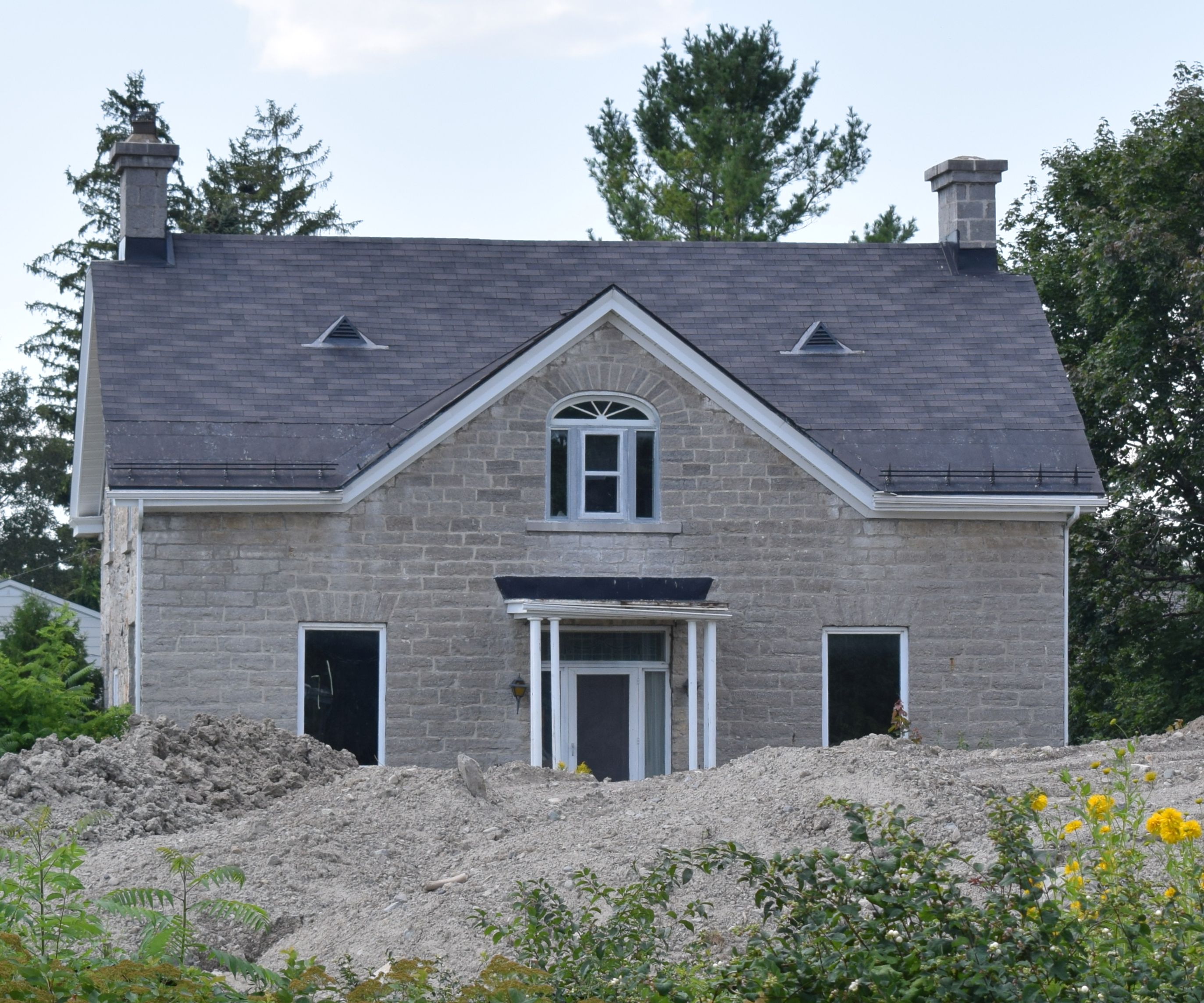
Kilmorie house

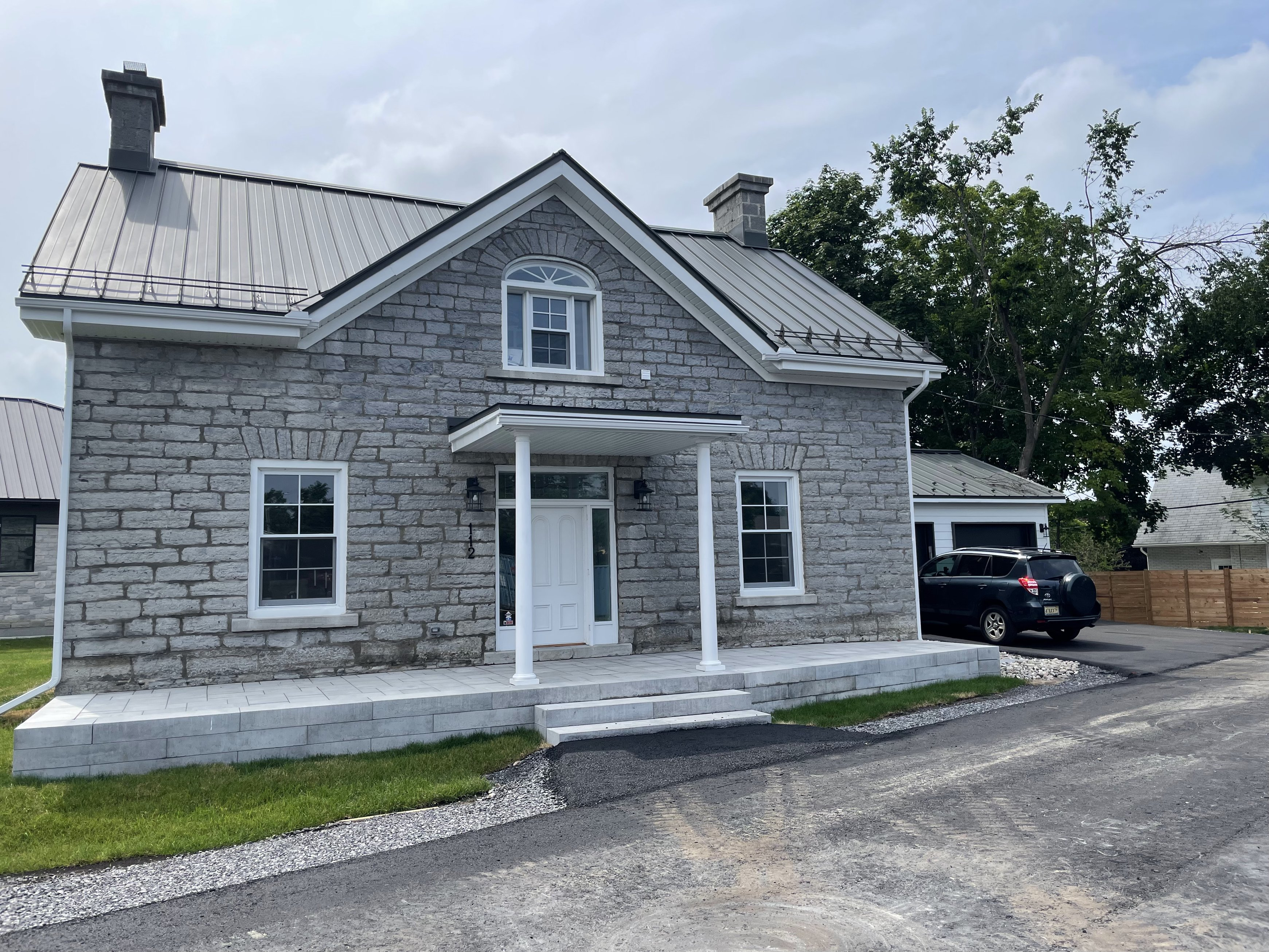
Kilmorie after renovation and lot subdivided

The Kilmorie house is a heritage home located at 21 Withrow Avenue in Ottawa, Ontario, the former home of one of the region's earliest settlers. The house was built circa 1840-1850 for farmer William Scott, who emigrated from Ireland to Upper Canada in 1819.

Kilmorie serves as a reminder of the area's agricultural history. It is one of Ottawa's oldest surviving houses, built 13–23 years after the Bytown Museum building, the oldest surviving stone house in Ottawa

In 1915, it was bought by the Poet William Wilfred Campbell, who moved in with his wife and extended family. He was the owner who named it Kilmorie. Campbell worked days and weekends to transform the rough grounds of the compound that surrounded the house into gardens and landscaping. Until 2020, the house used to sit on 2.1 acres of land. Claridge Homes acquired the property in 2020 and built 8+ homes around the heritage home.

Campbell enjoyed three years at Kilmorie before he died on New Year's morning, 1918. The Poets Pathway has put a plaque on Colonnade Road near Campbell's beloved Kilmorie that details one of his poems, Down the Merivale Road.

The house was bought in 1950 by Dr. J David Roger, an internist and radiologist, and his wife. The couple lived in the home until their respective deaths. Dr. J David Roger died in June 2015 at the age of 98. He lived in the house for 65 years.
