= James Morton (Canadian businessman) =

James Morton (August 29, 1808 – July 7, 1864) was a businessman and political figure in Canada West.

He was born in Ireland in 1808 and came to Kingston in Upper Canada in 1824, where he learned the brewery business from Thomas Molson. In 1831, he set up a brewery and distillery there with Robert Drummond and became sole owner after his partner's death in 1834. He later set up a sawmill and bought several ships to transport his goods. In 1856, he was involved in the construction of a section of the Grand Trunk Railway. Around 1854, he set up a factory to build railway engines. However, by 1860, he was bankrupt, having overextended himself financially before an economic downturn in 1857. In 1861, he was elected to the Legislative Assembly of the Province of Canada in 1861 for Frontenac.

He died in Kingston in 1864.
