= International Big Rideau Lake Speed Skating Marathon =

The International Big Rideau Lake Speed Skating Marathon is an annual speed skating competition held in Ontario, Canada. The event takes place on a 1km marked out track on the Big Rideau Lake.

Besides hosting the Official 2006 North American Marathon Skating Championship - two races of 25km and 50km, other races take place in the event; such as two shorter races of 5km and 10km, and a team relay race. Skaters in the 25 and 50K races can earn points, which will go towards the overall '2005-2006 Marathon Skating International Points Series'.

Last year, over 1,500 spectators arrived to cheer on 150 skaters from all over the globe - mainly Canada, the USA, Mexico, Australia and the Netherlands.
