= Robert Drummond (businessman) =

Canadian businessman

Robert Drummond (1791 – August 20, 1834) was a businessman in Upper Canada.

== Biography ==
Drummond was born in Gordon, Berwickshire, Scotland in 1791 and came to Montreal in 1817. He was involved in a number of construction projects, including a bridge across the Ottawa River at the Chaudière Falls. Lieutenant-Colonel John By hired Drummond as one of the main contractors involved in the building of the Rideau Canal. Drummond moved from Bytown to Kingston during the construction of the locks at Kingston Mills.

He was singled out for special notice for his contribution to the building of the canal. He was also involved in shipbuilding, having built a number of steamboats which operated on the canal, also serving Montreal. He became partners with James Morton in a brewery at Kingston and partnered with Philemon Wright in a mining operation at Hull, Quebec.

He died in Kingston in 1834 during a cholera epidemic.
