= Portland, Ontario =

Portland
- Police Village
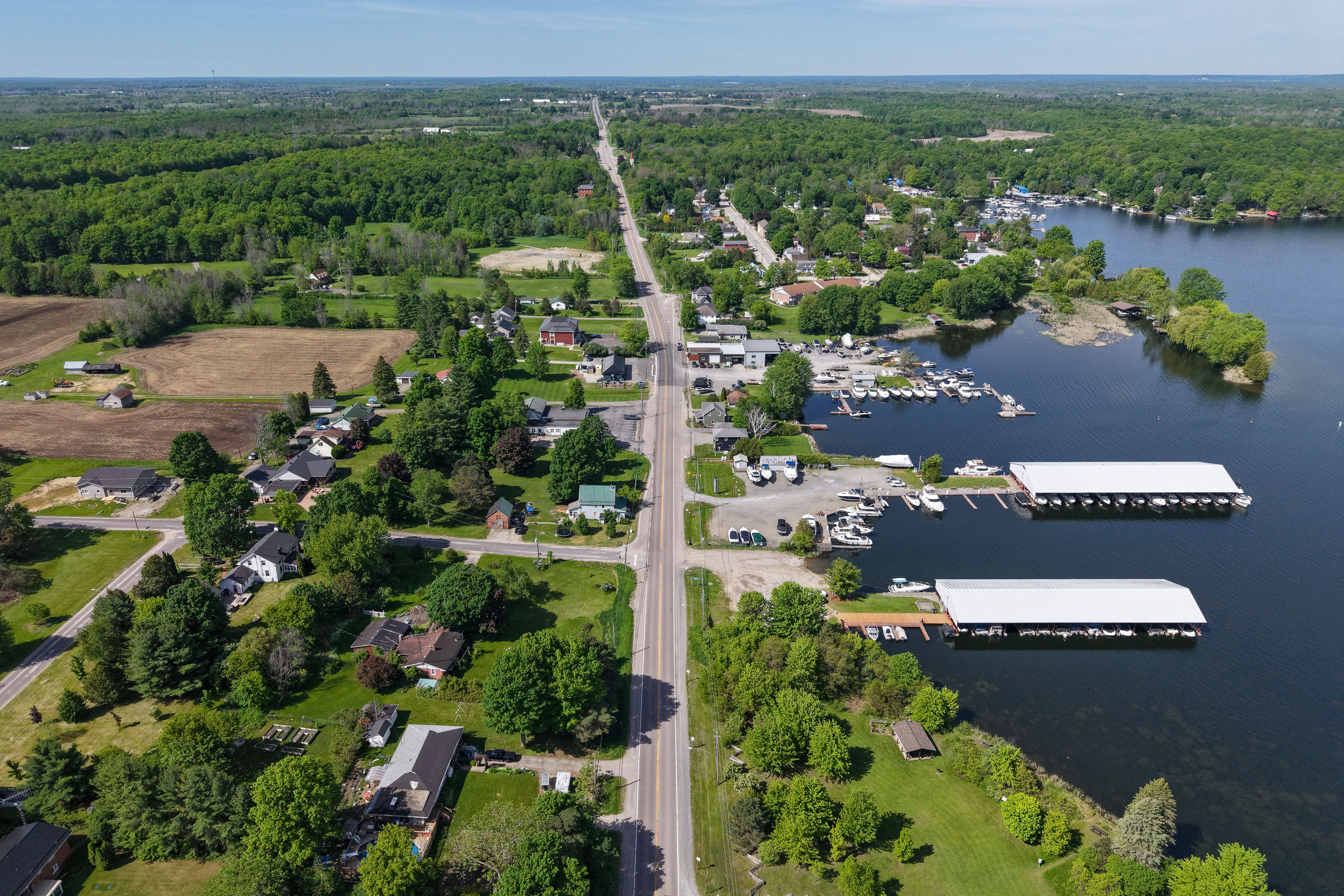
- Aerial view of Portland
- Etymology: Named for William Cavendish-Bentinck, 3rd Duke of Portland
- Location in southern Ontario
- Coordinates: 44°41′55″N 76°11′29″W
- Country: Canada
- Province: Ontario
- County: Leeds and Grenville
- Municipality: Rideau Lakes
- Elevation: 130 m (430 ft)
- Time zone: UTC-5 (Eastern Time Zone)
  - Summer (DST): UTC-4 (Eastern Time Zone)
- Postal Code: K0G 1V0
- Area codes: 613, 343
- Website: portlandontario.com

Portland is a police village and unincorporated place located in the municipal township of Rideau Lakes, United Counties of Leeds and Grenville in eastern Ontario, Canada. The community is on Ontario Highway 15 about 60 kilometres (37 mi) northeast of Ontario Highway 401 at Kingston by road, and is situated in geographic Bastard Township on the southeast side of Big Rideau Lake.

== History ==
Portland was first settled in the early 19th century as one of the first settlements along the Rideau Waterway. The original seven houses in Portland, informally known as "The Landing", were a transfer point for passengers travelling from Brockville and continuing by barge to Perth.

With the completion of the Rideau Canal Waterway in 1832, steamboats and barges carrying raw materials such as cordwood, maple syrup, potash, cheese, tanned hides and salt beef were a common sight. Portland became a thriving village of trade with Kingston, Montreal and Ottawa.

The village of Portland took its name in 1843 from William Cavendish-Bentinck, 3rd Duke of Portland. By the 1860s, the settlement had expanded considerably to require five hotels and, by the early 20th century, cottages were springing up around the lake and the tourist trade had begun. Advances in rail and road travel and increasing tourism offset a decline in the role of agriculture in the economy of Portland. Tourism then began to lead the economy of Portland, and still does to this day.

== Annual tournament ==
An international speed skating tournament called Skate the Lake is held each winter by Portland Outdoors on the Big Rideau Lake.

== Notes ==
A township named Portland is located in South Frontenac approximately 60 kilometers west of Portland (the village itself). Its unknown if the township and the village had any connections with the same name due to its close proximity. In 1998, Portland Township was amalgamated into South Frontenac.

English actor, David Niven, visited Portland several times and mentions it as one of his favorite places in his book "The Moon's a Balloon".
