= Black Creek (Big Rideau Lake) =

Stream in Eastern Ontario, Canada

- Location of the mouth of Black Creek in southern Ontario

Location
- Country: Canada
- Province: Ontario
- Region: Eastern Ontario
- Counties: Lanark; Leeds and Grenville
- Municipalities: Tay Valley; Rideau Lakes

Physical characteristics
- Source: Unnamed lake
  - location: Rideau Lakes
  - coordinates: 44°44′52″N 76°20′49″W
  - elevation: 147 m (482 ft)
- Mouth: Big Rideau Lake
  - location: Tay Valley
  - coordinates: 44°46′19″N 76°14′02″W
  - elevation: 123.1 m (404 ft)
- Basin size: 94 km^{2} (36 sq mi)

Basin features
- River system: Saint Lawrence River drainage basin

Black Creek is a stream in the municipalities of Tay Valley, Lanark County and Rideau Lakes, United Counties of Leeds and Grenville in Eastern Ontario, Canada. It flows from an unnamed lake in Rideau Lakes to the west shore of Big Rideau Lake in Tay Valley. Big Rideau Lake, on the Rideau Canal, flows via the Rideau River and Ottawa River to the Saint Lawrence River. The stream has a drainage basin of 94 square kilometres (36 sq mi).

== Sources ==
- Map 6 (PDF) (Map). 1 : 700,000. Official road map of Ontario. Ministry of Transportation of Ontario. 2014.
- Restructured municipalities - Ontario map #5 (Map). Restructuring Maps of Ontario. Ontario Ministry of Municipal Affairs and Housing. 2006. Archived from the original on 2020-05-11.
