= Ottawa and District Labour Council =

Canadian labour organisation

The Ottawa and District Labour Council or ODLC (French name Conseil du Travail d’Ottawa et du District or CTOD) is the central labour body for Ottawa, Ontario, Canada. Its membership is union locals of national or international unions affiliated to the Canadian Labour Congress. The Ottawa & District Labour Council is one of the oldest Canadian labour organizations tracing its inception to the Ottawa Trades Council in 1872.

In 1957, with the merger of the Trades and Labour Congress of Canada (TCL) and the Canadian Congress of Labour (CCL) to form the Canadian Labour Congress (CLC) their two rival labour councils also merged. The Allied Trades and Labour Association (TLC) and the Ottawa-Hull Labour Council (CCL) merged to form the Ottawa and District Trades and Labour Council. It was not long after that the name was shortened to the Ottawa and District Labour Council.

No official records have survived prior to 1906 but it is known that the Council initiated the first official meeting of labour with a Prime Minister of Canada, Sir John A. Macdonald in 1873. It took part in the formation of the first national central labour body, the Canadian Labour Union hosting its second convention in 1874. That same year the council's president, Daniel John O'Donoghue, was elected to the Ontario Legislature, the first trade unionist elected to a legislature in Canada. The council disbanded in 1877 and reformed in 1889. The records of the council which include minutes, reports, correspondence, files and yearbooks are on file at the National Archives of Canada dating from 1906. These records are open to the general public.

== See also ==
- Rideau Canal Celtic Cross Committee
