= Big Rideau Lake =

Lake in Ontario, Canada

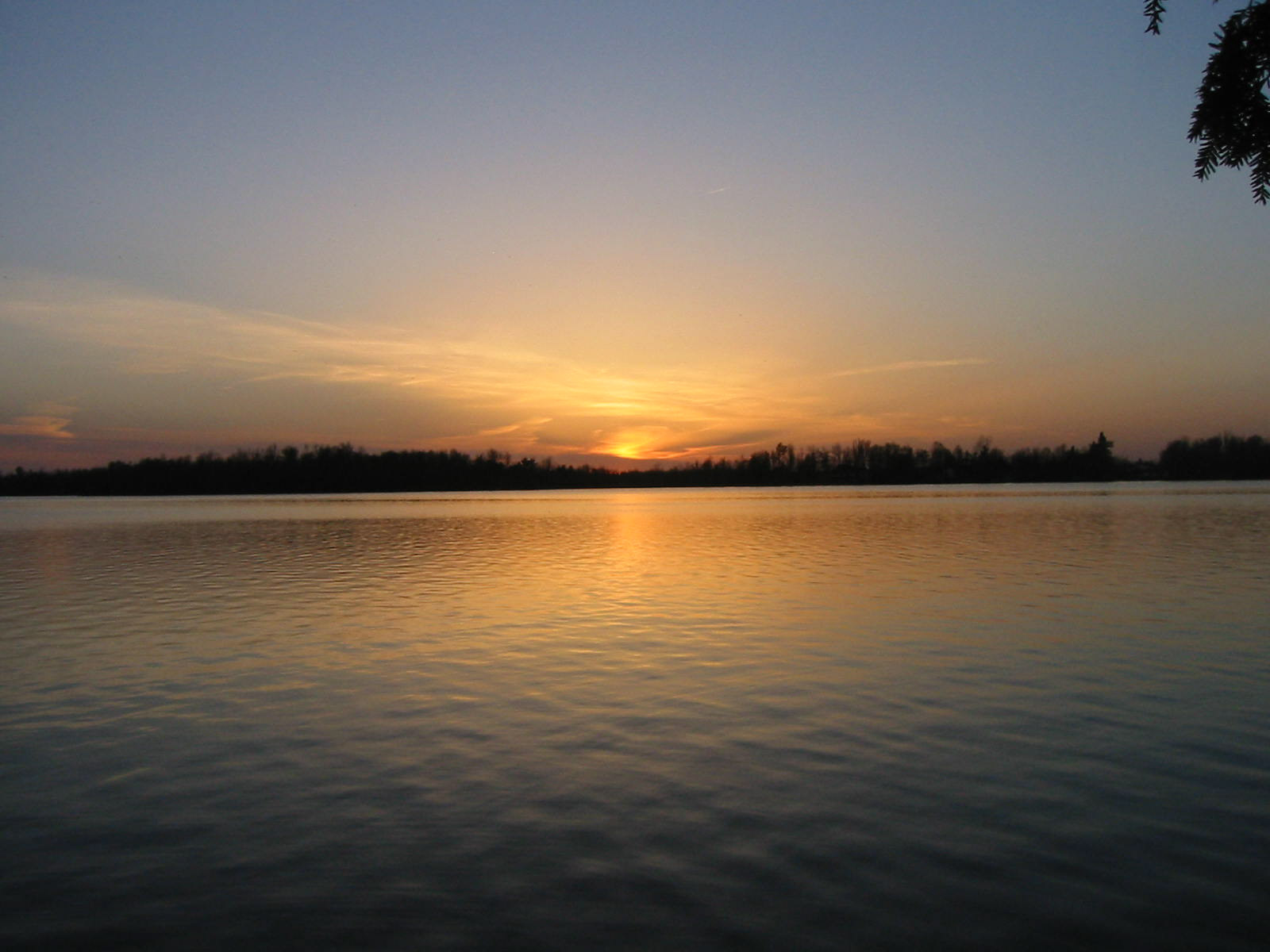
- Sunset on the lake

- Location in southern Ontario
- Location: Lanark County, United Counties of Leeds and Grenville, Ontario
- Coordinates: 44°45′05″N 76°12′50″W
- Part of: Saint Lawrence River drainage basin
- Primary inflows: Black Creek, Rideau River
- Primary outflows: Rideau River
- Catchment area: 407 square kilometres (157 sq mi)
- Basin countries: Canada
- Max. length: 32 kilometres (20 mi)
- Max. width: 6 kilometres (3.7 mi)
- Max. depth: 360 feet (110 m)
- Surface elevation: 123.1 metres (403 ft 10 in)
- Settlements: Portland, Rideau Ferry

Big Rideau Lake is a lake in the municipalities of Tay Valley and Drummond/North Elmsley, Lanark County and Rideau Lakes, United Counties of Leeds and Grenville in Eastern Ontario, Canada. The lake is on the border between the two counties, 72 kilometres (45 mi) to the southwest of Ottawa. It is 32 kilometres (20 mi) long and is 6 kilometres (3.7 mi) wide, is much narrower at its northeastern end than at its southwestern end, and is part of the Saint Lawrence River drainage basin. It is the largest lake on the Rideau Canal, which was designated a UNESCO world heritage site in 2007.

== Hydrology ==
The primary inflow, at the southwest, is the Rideau River/Rideau Canal from Upper Rideau Lake via The Narrows channel and the Narrows lock and control structures. A second primary inflow is Black Creek at the west. The primary outflow, at the north, is also the Rideau River/Rideau Canal which leads via a channel to Lower Rideau Lake. The Rideau River and Canal flow to the Ottawa River and then to the Saint Lawrence River.

== Settlements ==
The small community of Rideau Ferry is located at the junction between the Big Rideau and Lower Rideau Lake, at the northeastern end of the lake. The community of Portland is located along the southern shore of the lake.

== Recreation ==
The shoreline of the Big Rideau Lake is lined with hundreds of cottages and houses. A public recreation area and campground, Murphys Point Provincial Park, is located along a substantial stretch of the shoreline on the northern side of the lake.

The Big Rideau Lake Association (BRLA) is a non-profit organization that was formed in 1911, and operates summer programs from Cow Island, one of the many islands in Big Rideau. Its purpose is "to preserve and enhance the quality of life on Big Rideau Lake." The BRLA places private shoal markers throughout the lake, marking hazards underwater at some times in the navigational season. A group of markers indicate the extent of a shoal: go around, not between.

Admiral Sir Charles Kingsmill, who played a role in founding the Royal Canadian Navy, loved sailing on the lake, and had a summer house on Grindstone Island. He died on Grindstone in July 1935.

== Events ==
The International Big Rideau Lake Speed Skating Marathon is an annual event.

== Natural history ==
The common fish found in the Big Rideau Lake include Sunfish, Rock Bass, Northern Pike, Large and Small Mouth Bass, Crappie, Walleye and Lake Trout.

== Tributaries ==
- Rideau River
- Black Creek

== See also ==
- List of lakes in Ontario
