= Rideau Canal =

Canal in Canada

Coordinates: 45°25′33″N 75°41′50″W

- Rideau Canal (English); Canal Rideau (French)
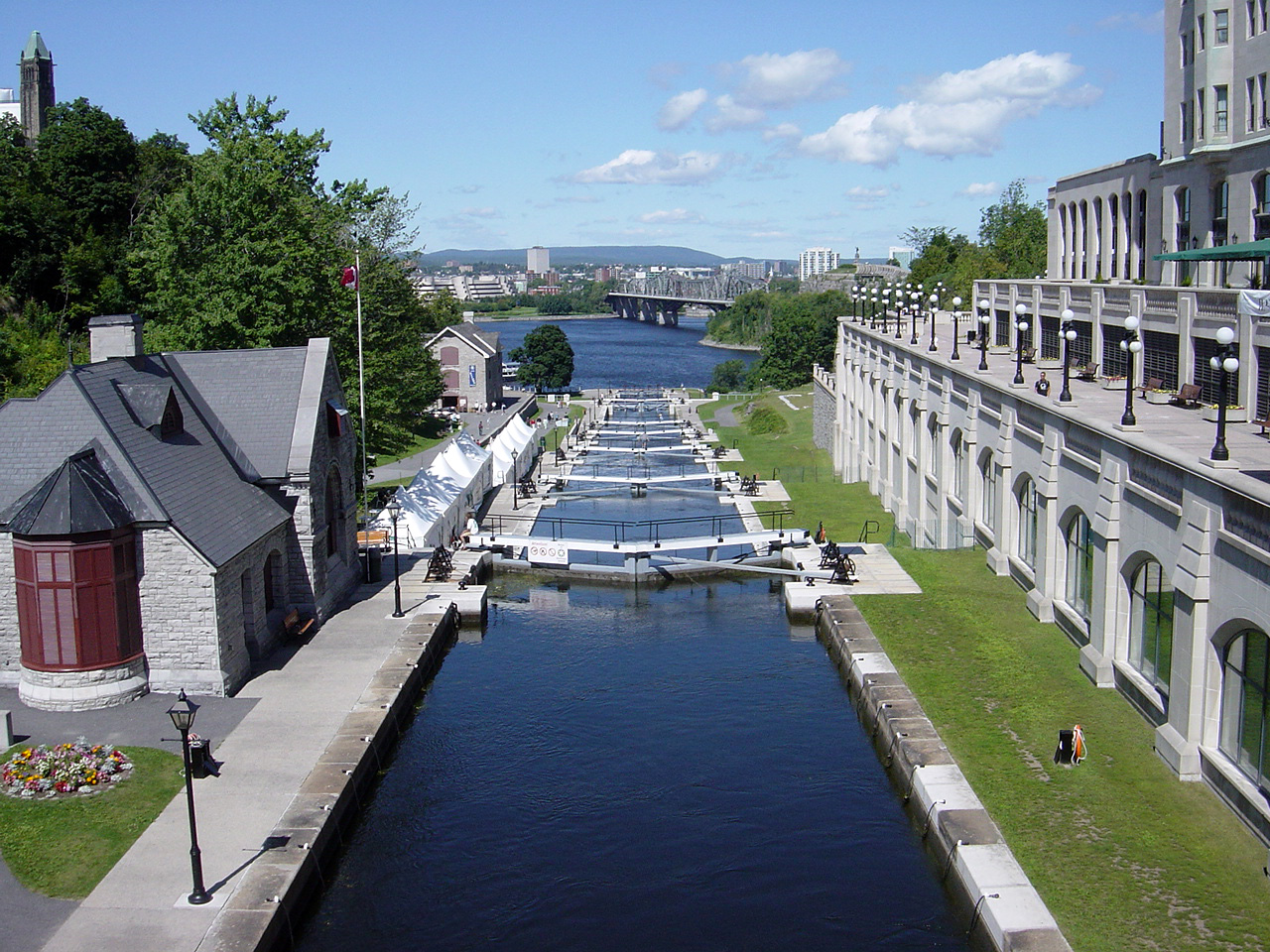
- The Ottawa Locks at Colonel By Valley

History
- Built: 1832

Site notes
- Length: 202 km (126 mi)
- Area: Ontario
- Architect: John By
- Governing body: Parks Canada

UNESCO World Heritage Site
- Type: Cultural
- Criteria: i, iv
- Designated: 2007 (31st session)
- Reference no.: 1221
- Region: North America

National Historic Site of Canada
- Designated: 1925

Rideau Canal
- Interactive map of Rideau Canal

Specifications
- Length: 202 km (126 miles)
- Maximum boat length: 90 ft 0 in (27.43 m)
- Maximum boat beam: 26 ft 0 in (7.92 m)
- Maximum boat draft: 1.5 m (5 ft), only 4ft guaranteed
- Locks: 47
- Status: Open (seasonal)

History
- Construction began: 1826
- Date completed: 1832

Geography
- Start point: Ottawa River
- End point: Lake Ontario

The Rideau Canal is a 202-kilometre long canal that links the Ottawa River at Ottawa with the Cataraqui River and Lake Ontario at Kingston, Ontario, Canada. Its 46 locks raise boats from the Ottawa River 83 metres (272 feet) upstream along the Rideau River to the Rideau Lakes, and from there drop 50 metres (164 feet) downstream along the Cataraqui River to Kingston.

The Rideau Canal opened in 1832 for commercial shipping. Freight was eventually moved to railways and the St. Lawrence Seaway, but the canal remains in use today for pleasure boating, operated by Parks Canada from May through October. It is the oldest continuously operated canal system in North America, and is a UNESCO World Heritage Site.

== Toponymy ==
It is named for the Rideau River, which was in turn named for Rideau Falls. The name Rideau, French for "curtain", is derived from the curtain-like appearance of the falls where they join the Ottawa River.

== History ==
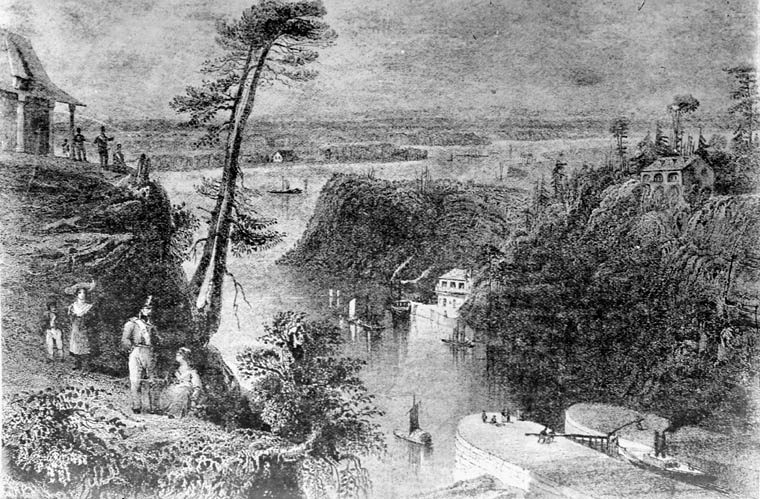
An engraving of the Rideau Canal locks at Bytown

=== Plan ===
After the War of 1812, information was received about the United States' plans to invade the British colony of Upper Canada from upstate New York by following the St. Lawrence River. This would have severed the lifeline between Montreal and a major naval base at Kingston. To protect against such an attack in the future, the British began the construction or reinforcement of a number of defences including Citadel Hill in Halifax, La Citadelle in Quebec City, and Fort Henry in Kingston.

To ensure safe passage for military vessels between Montreal and Kingston, a route was planned that would proceed westward from Montreal, up the Ottawa River to the mouth of the Rideau River, later the site of Bytown (now Ottawa), then southwest via a series of short canals connecting natural water bodies (rivers and lakes) to Kingston which is located on Lake Ontario. The Rideau would form the last portion of this route, along with shorter canals at Grenville, Chute-à-Blondeau and Carillon to bypass rapids and other hazards along the route.

The Rideau Route portion of this safe military supply route from Montreal to Kingston was first surveyed in 1783 by Lt. Gershom French, not as a canal route but as potential area for Loyalist settlement. At that time, there was no water connection to Kingston, the route, a long used indigenous water travel route, led from Rideau Falls up the Rideau River to Rideau Lake, over the watershed divide at Newboro and into the lower Rideau lakes, and then, via the White Fish River (now drowned), to Lower Beverley Lake and then by way of the Gananoque River to the St. Lawrence River.

The first survey for a canal route was done in 1816 by Sir Joshua Jebb. Jebb, then a young 22 year-old Royal Engineer, surveyed the main route by way of the Rideau Lakes and also a shortcut route from the mouth of Irish Creek on the Rideau River to Morton Bay where it would return to the main Rideau Route. At the time of Jebb's survey, a water connection to Kingston had been established due to flooding created by mill dams located at White Fish Falls (today's Morton) and the Round Tail (just north of Upper Brewers), which flooded a previously non navigable area, the Cranberry floodplain.

Jebb's shortcut proposal became known as the Irish Creek Route and it was the route Jebb recommended in his report. The next Rideau Route survey by civilian surveyor Samuel Clowes (1823–24) discounted the Irish Creek Route, in part because it contained a 5 mile (8 km) overland section. Clowes preferred route was by way of the Rideau lakes since, although a longer route, the summit of the proposed canal was a body of water (Rideau Lake).

In 1819, Charles Lennox, 4th Duke of Richmond, who was the Governor-in-Chief of British North America, planned to make an inspection of the planned route for the Canal. However, Richmond had been bitten by a fox, and died in a settlement near Richmond after experiencing symptoms of rabies. Richmond had earlier convinced the Duke of Wellington, at the time Master-General of the Ordnance, to become interested in the project. On 1 March 1819, Wellington wrote a memorandum which, in part, advocated that the Rideau Canal should be built as part of the defence system for Canada.

When Lt. Colonel John By was brought out of retirement in 1826 to be the Superintending Engineer for the Rideau Canal project he had both Lt. Joshua Jebb's 1816 survey and Samuel Clowes' 1823-24 surveys and canal proposals. With Jebb's Irish Creek shortcut route discounted by Clowes, Colonel By only considered the Rideau lakes route.

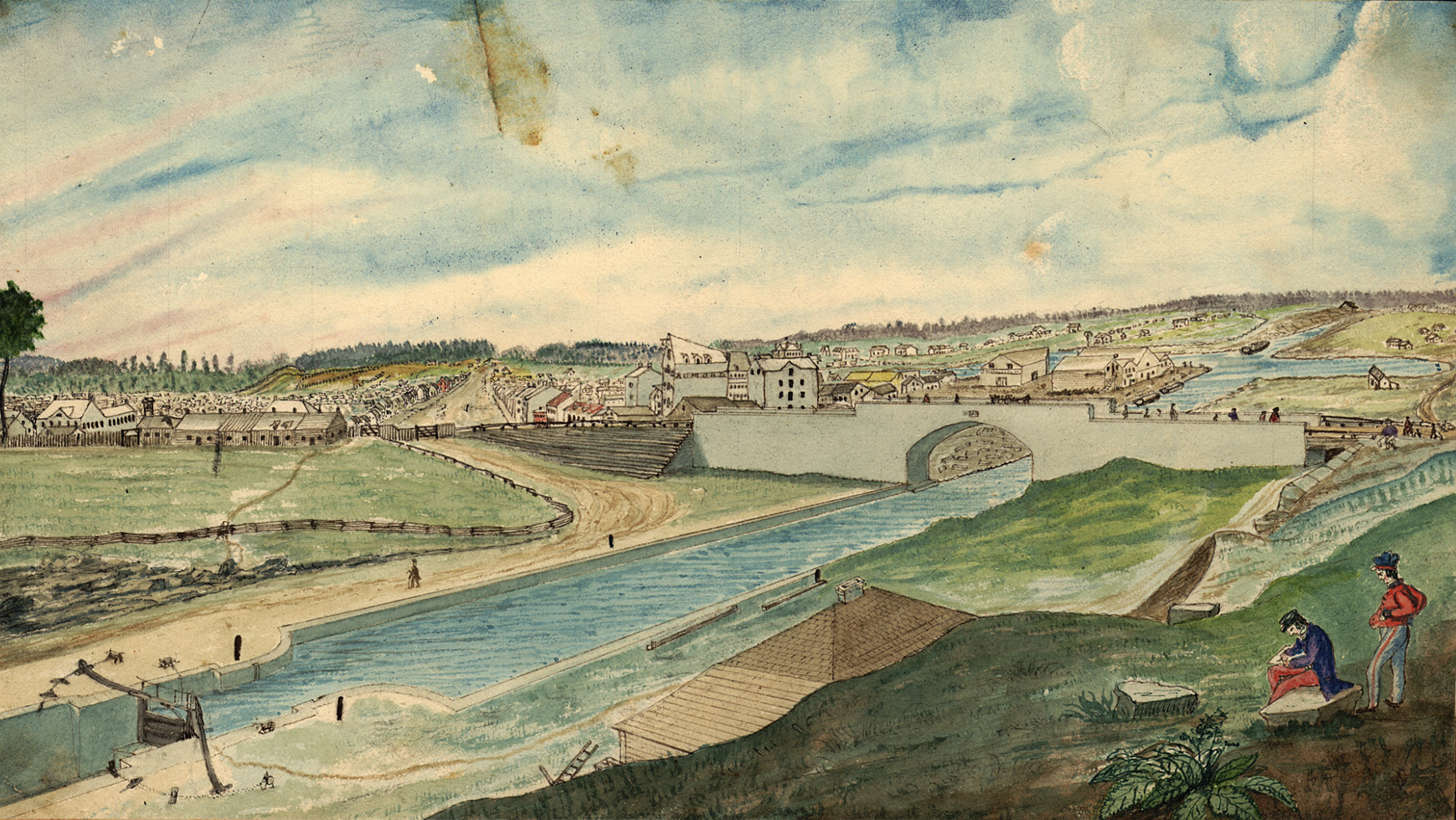
1845 painting of the canal and Lower Town by Thomas Burrowes

=== Construction ===
The construction of the canal was supervised by Lieutenant-Colonel John By of the Royal Engineers. Private contractors such as future sugar refining entrepreneur John Redpath, Thomas McKay, Robert Drummond, Thomas Phillips, Andrew White and others were responsible for much of the construction, and the majority of the actual work was done by thousands of Irish, Scottish, and French-Canadian labourers. Colonel John By decided to create a slackwater canal system using dams to raise the water level to sink rapids instead of constructing new channels around them. This was a better approach as it required fewer workers, was more cost effective, and would have been easier to build.

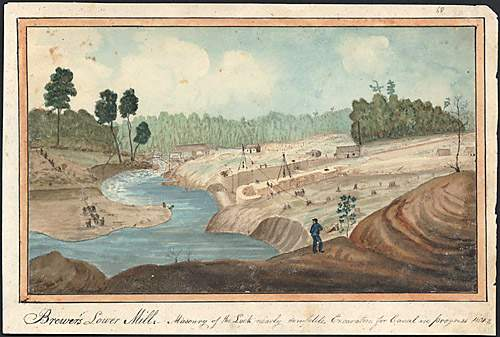
The lock at Lower Brewers nearing completion in 1831, by Thomas Burrowes

The canal work started in the fall of 1826, and it was completed by the spring of 1832. The first full steamboat transit of the canal was made by Robert Drummond's steamboat, Rideau (aka "Pumper"), leaving Kingston on May 22, 1832, with Colonel By and family on board, and arriving in Bytown on May 29, 1832.

The final cost of the canal's construction was £822,804 when all the costs, including land acquisition, were accounted for (January 1834). Because of the unexpected cost overruns, John By was recalled to London and was retired; he received no accolades or recognition for his tremendous accomplishment.

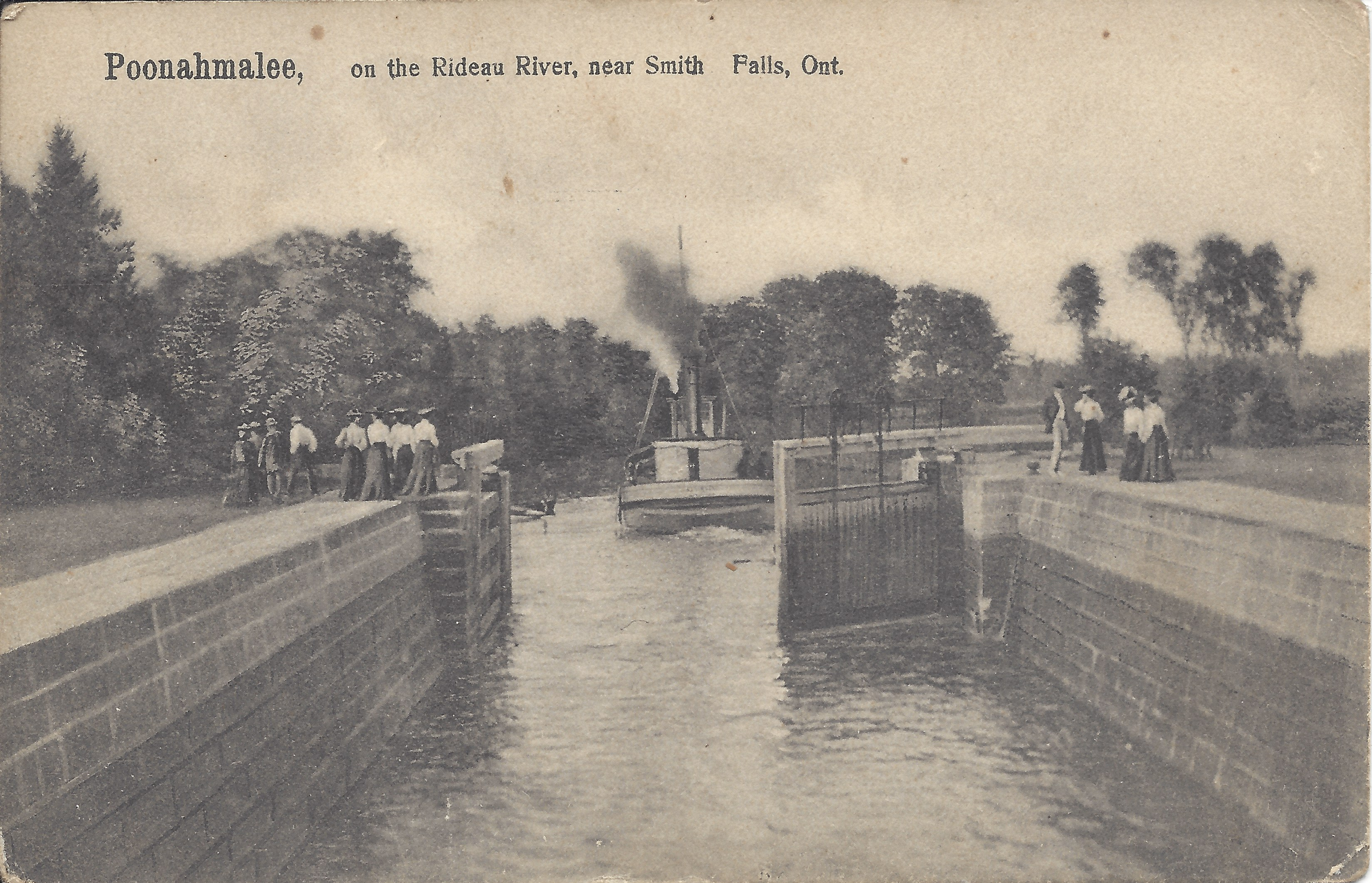
Poonahmalee, on the Rideau River, near Smith Falls, Ontario – October 1906

=== Commercial use ===
Since the canal was completed, no further military engagements have taken place between Canada and the United States. Although the Rideau was not put to defensive use, it played a pivotal role in the early development of Canada and encouraged shipping, trade, and settlement of Upper Canada by tens of thousands of immigrants.

The canal was easier to navigate than the St. Lawrence River because of significant rapids in the river between Montreal and Kingston. As a result, the Rideau Canal became a busy commercial artery between Montreal and the Great Lakes. It was also used by tens of thousands of immigrants from the British Isles heading westward into Upper Canada in this period.

It was a major route for shipping heavy goods (timber, minerals, grain) from Canada's hinterland east to Montreal. Hundreds of barge loads of goods were shipped each year along the Rideau; in 1841, for instance, some 19 steamboats, 3 self-propelled barges, and 157 unpowered or tow barges used the Rideau Canal. The canal had to compete with the Erie Canal through New York State. Some of the shipments that might have been made from Kingston east, instead were taken to the opposite side of the St. Lawrence River to Oswego, New York. There they traveled by the Oswego Canal to reach the Erie and, via the Hudson River, New York City markets.

Businessmen in Kingston studied the issue. They considered building another canal to Lake Simcoe and on to the French River and Georgian Bay, thereby enabling traffic on the upper Great Lakes to use canals all the way to Montreal and avoid shipping through the entire lakes system. This plan eventually emerged as the Trent-Severn Waterway. It had originally been surveyed as a military route but never built. A simpler plan was to route around the dangerous parts of the St. Lawrence to allow direct shipping from Kingston to Montreal, and this was soon underway.

By 1849, the rapids of the St. Lawrence were made navigable by a series of locks, and commercial shippers were quick to switch to this more direct route. But commercial use of the Rideau largely ended after the Prescott and Bytown Railway was opened in December 1854. It provided faster service than shipping by the canal.

Further work improving the direct route continued along the St. Lawrence River. In the 1950s it was developed as the current Saint Lawrence Seaway, which allowed ocean-going ships access to the Great Lakes.

=== Current use ===
After the arrival of railway routes into Ottawa, most use of the canal was for pleasure craft. The introduction of the outboard motor led to an increase in small pleasure craft and increasing use of inland waterways like the Rideau and Trent-Severn. Today the Rideau forms part of the Great Loop, a major waterway route connecting a large area of the eastern United States and Canada.

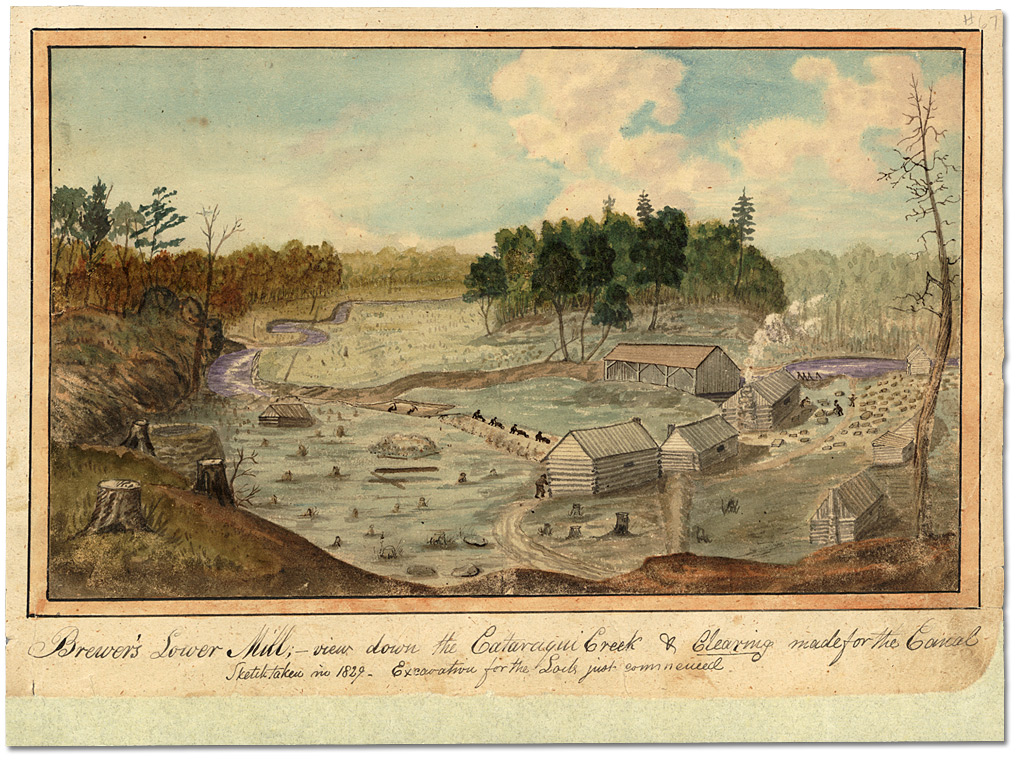
Brewer's Lower Mill – view down the Cataraqui Creek and clearing made for the Rideau Canal, 1829 by Thomas Burrowes

=== Construction deaths ===
As many as one thousand of the workers died during the construction of the canal. Most deaths were from disease, principally complications from malaria (P. vivax), which was endemic in Ontario within the range of the Anopheles mosquito, and other diseases of the day. Accidents were fairly rare for a project of this size; in 1827 there were seven accidental deaths recorded. Inquests were held for each accidental death. The men, women and children who died were buried in local cemeteries, either burial grounds set up near work sites or existing local cemeteries. Funerals were held for the workers and the graves marked with wooden markers (which have since rotted away—leading to a misconception that workers were buried in unmarked graves).

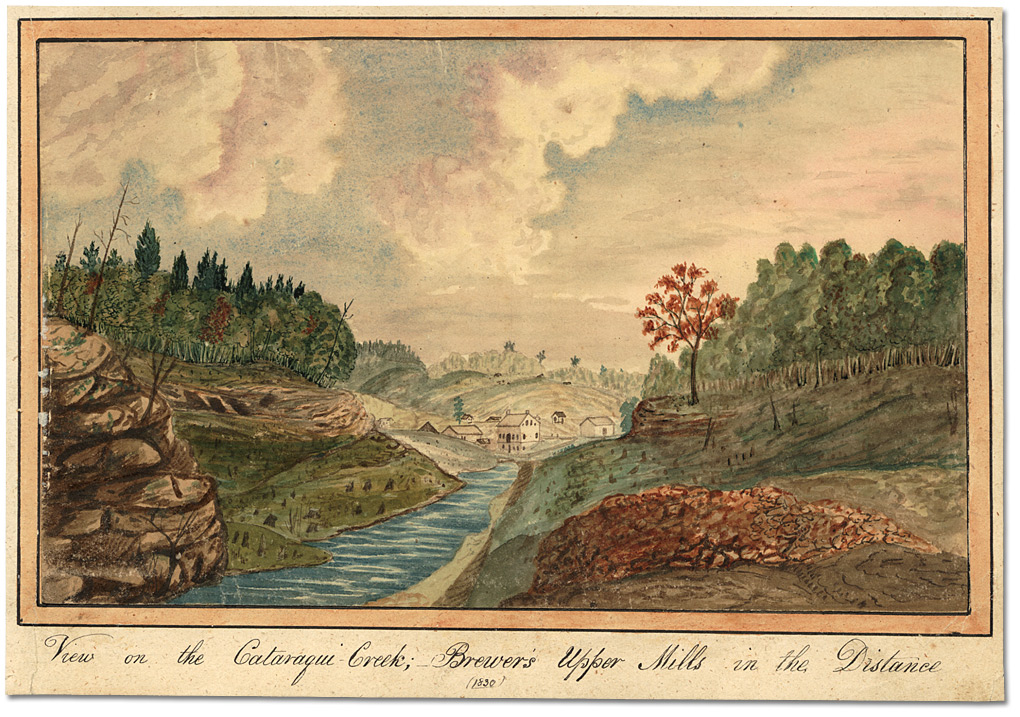
View on the Cataraqui Creek, Brewer's Upper Mills in the background, 1830 by Thomas Burrowes

Some of the dead remain unidentified as they had no known relatives in Upper Canada. Memorials have been erected along the canal route, most recently the Celtic Cross memorials in Ottawa, Kingston and Chaffeys Lock. The first memorial on the Rideau Canal acknowledging deaths among the labour force was erected in 1993 by the Kingston and District Labour Council and the Ontario Heritage Foundation at Kingston Mills.

Three canal era cemeteries are open to the public today: Chaffey's Cemetery and Memory Wall at Chaffey's Lock—this cemetery was used from 1825 to the late 19th century; the Royal Sappers and Miners Cemetery (originally called the Military and Civilian Cemetery and then as the Old Presbyterian Cemetery) near Newboro—used from 1828 to the 1940s; and McGuigan Cemetery near Merrickville—used from the early 19th century (c. 1805) to the late 1890s.

=== Recognition ===
The Rideau Canal was designated a National Historic Site in 1925, and marked with a federal plaque the next year, and again in 1962 and 2013.

The canal has been featured on postage stamps issued by Canada Post. Two 45-cent stamps—'Rideau Canal, Summer Boating at Jones Falls' and 'Rideau Canal, Winter Skating by Parliament'—were issued on June 17, 1998, as part of the Canals and Recreational Destinations series. The stamps were designed by Carey George and Dean Martin, based on paintings by Vincent McIndoe. In 2014, the canal appeared on a $2.50 international rate stamp as part of a Canada Post set honoring World Heritage Sites. The same design was reprised on a 2016 domestic-rate stamp.

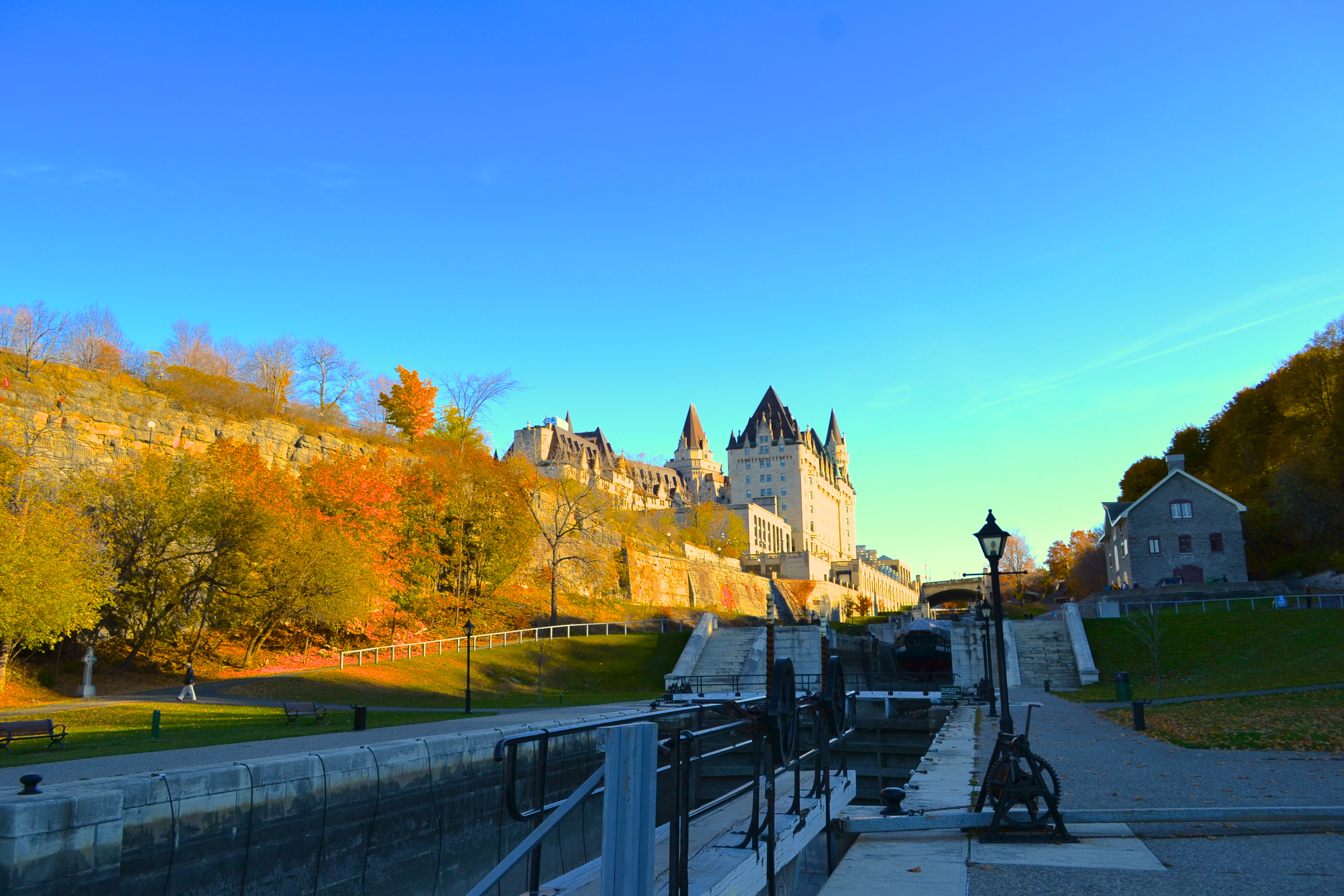
Looking up from the bottom of the Ottawa Lockstation of the Rideau Canal. Chateau Laurier in Center rear.

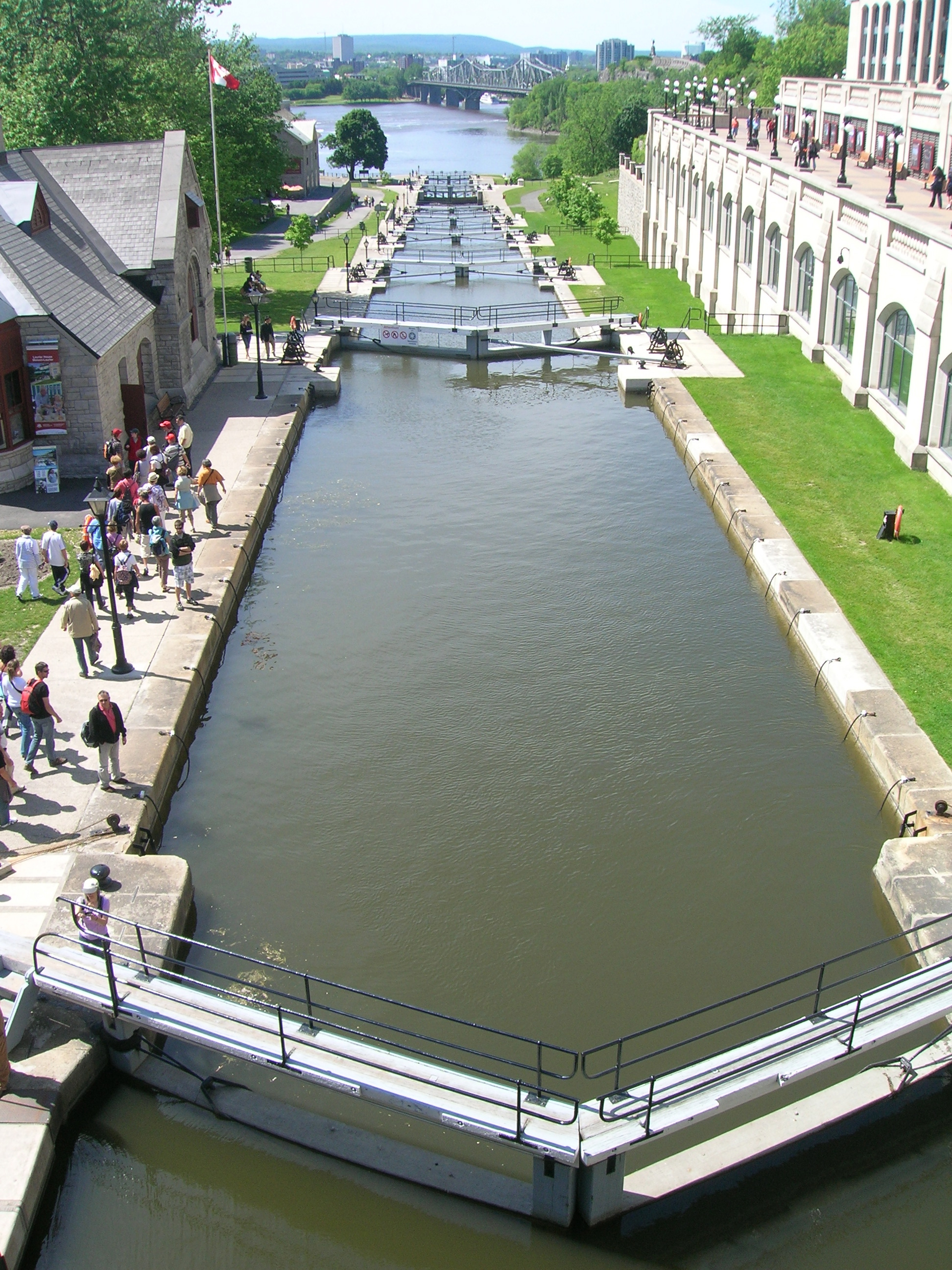
Rideau Canal Locks looking down towards the Ottawa River from Wellington Street

In 1993, British Waterways and Parks Canada agreed to twin the canal with the Caledonian Canal in Scotland.

In 2000 the Rideau Waterway was designated a Canadian Heritage River in recognition of its outstanding historical and recreational values.

In 2007 it was inscribed as a UNESCO World Heritage Site recognizing it as a work of human creative genius. The Rideau Canal was recognized as the best preserved example of a slack water canal in North America demonstrating the use of European slackwater technology in North America on a large scale. It is the only canal dating from the great North American canal-building era of the early 19th century that remains operational along its original line with most of its original structures intact. It was also recognized as an extensive, well preserved and significant example of a canal which was used for military purposes linked to a significant stage in human history – that of the fight to control the north of the American continent.

A plaque was erected by the Ontario Archaeological and Historic Sites Board at Jones Falls Lockstation commemorating Lieutenant Colonel John By, Royal Engineer, the superintending engineer in charge of the construction of the Rideau Canal. The plaque notes the 123-mile-long (198 km) Rideau Canal, built as a military route and incorporating 47 locks, 16 lakes, two rivers, and a 360-foot-long (110 m), 60-foot-high (18.3 m) dam at Jones Falls (Jones Falls Dam), was completed in 1832.

Other plaques to the canal erected by the Ontario Heritage Trust are at Kingston Mills, Smiths Falls, and Rideau Lakes.

== Waterway ==
The 202 kilometres (126 mi) of the Rideau Canal incorporate sections of the Rideau and Cataraqui rivers, as well as several lakes, including Lower, Upper and Big Rideau lakes, as well as Newboro, Opinicon, Sand, Whitefish, and Cranberry Lakes. About 19 km (12 mi) of the route is artificial.

Communities along the waterway include Ottawa, Manotick, Kars, Burritts Rapids, Merrickville, Smiths Falls, Rideau Ferry, Portland, Westport, Newboro, Seeleys Bay and Kingston. Communities connected by navigable waterways to the Rideau Canal include Kemptville and Perth.

Since World War I and the construction of more extensive rail lines into rural Ontario, only pleasure craft make use of the Rideau Canal. It takes 3–5 days to travel one way through the Rideau Canal system by motor boat. Boat tours of the canal are offered in Ottawa, Kingston, Merrickville, and Chaffeys Lock. A cruise line operates the ship Kawartha Voyageur. Recreational boaters can use it to travel between Ottawa and Kingston.

=== Locks ===
The Rideau Canal uses a lock system that is still fully functioning. The gates that let boats in and out of the locks last approximately 12–15 years. When the canal was constructed, the gates were made at the lock sites by carpenters and blacksmiths, but presently they are made in Smiths Falls, Ontario, and sometimes it takes up to two months to build a set of gates. The gates used on the Rideau Canal are made of Douglas Fir and are mitre-shaped to ensure a tight seal due to water pressure. The average Rideau Canal lock lift uses 1.3 million litres (1,300 m^{3}; 1,700 cu yd or 290,000 imp gal; 340,000 US gal) of water.

Most of the locks are still hand-operated. There are a total of 45 locks at 23 stations along the canal, plus two locks (locks 33 and 34) at the entrance to the Tay Canal (leading to Perth). The elevation between the Ottawa River and its summit at Upper Rideau Lake, is 83 metres (273 feet), the elevation change from Upper Rideau Lake to Lake Ontario is 50 metres (164 feet). Furthermore, there are four blockhouses and some of the original 16 defensible lockmasters residences along the waterway. The original Commissariat Building and foundation of the Royal Engineers' barracks remain at the Ottawa Lock Station. The waterway is home to many species of birds, reptiles, amphibians, mammals and fish.

In 1973–74 a new Smiths Falls Combined Lock, 29a, was built a few dozen metres to the north of the original flight of three locks (locks 28–30). The original locks were bypassed but left in place.

==== Rideaumax ====
In normal operations the canal can handle boats up to 27.4 m (89 ft 11 in) in length, 7.9 m (25 ft 11 in) in width, and 6.7 m (22 ft) in height with a draft of up to 1.5 m (4 ft 11 in) (boats drafting over 1.2 m (3 ft 11 in). In special circumstances a boat up to 33.5 m (109 ft 11 in) in length by 9.1 m (29 ft 10 in) in width can be handled.

=== Blockhouses ===
Four blockhouses were built from 1826 to 1832 to provide protection for the canal, which was under the control of the British Forces:

- Merrickville Blockhouse – used briefly during 1837 Rebellion, it became a residence for the lockmaster, upper floor removed in 1909 and restored in 1960 as a museum
- Kingston Mills Blockhouse – used in 1837–1838, then enlarged to use as a residence, more alterations made in 1909 and restored to 1830 layout in the 1960s
- Newboro Blockhouse – built by the British Ordnance Department, it was also used briefly for its intended military role in the 1830s and then converted to home for lockmaster; restored in 1960s to original blockhouse configuration.
- Rideau Narrows Blockhouse – built by William H. Tett it was also altered in the 19th century to become lockmaster's residence and restored from 1967 to 1970 to its original layout.

A fifth blockhouse at Burritts Rapids was partially built in 1832 before work was stopped with only the foundation and walls completed, then rebuilt in 1914–1915 and finally demolished to be replaced by the current lock station in 1969.

=== Commissariat Building ===
The Commissariat Building is the oldest stone building still standing in Ottawa. It was built in 1827 as a storehouse and offices for the Commissariat, the supply and services division of the British Military. The building has three floors, a secure vault, two sets of staircases, and a block and tackle on the front for hauling goods into the upper floors. After being divided into workshops and residential apartments, the Commissariat Building has housed the Bytown Museum since 1917.

Parliament Hill was intended to be the site of a fortress, to be called Citadel Hill, where the canal ended at the Ottawa River.

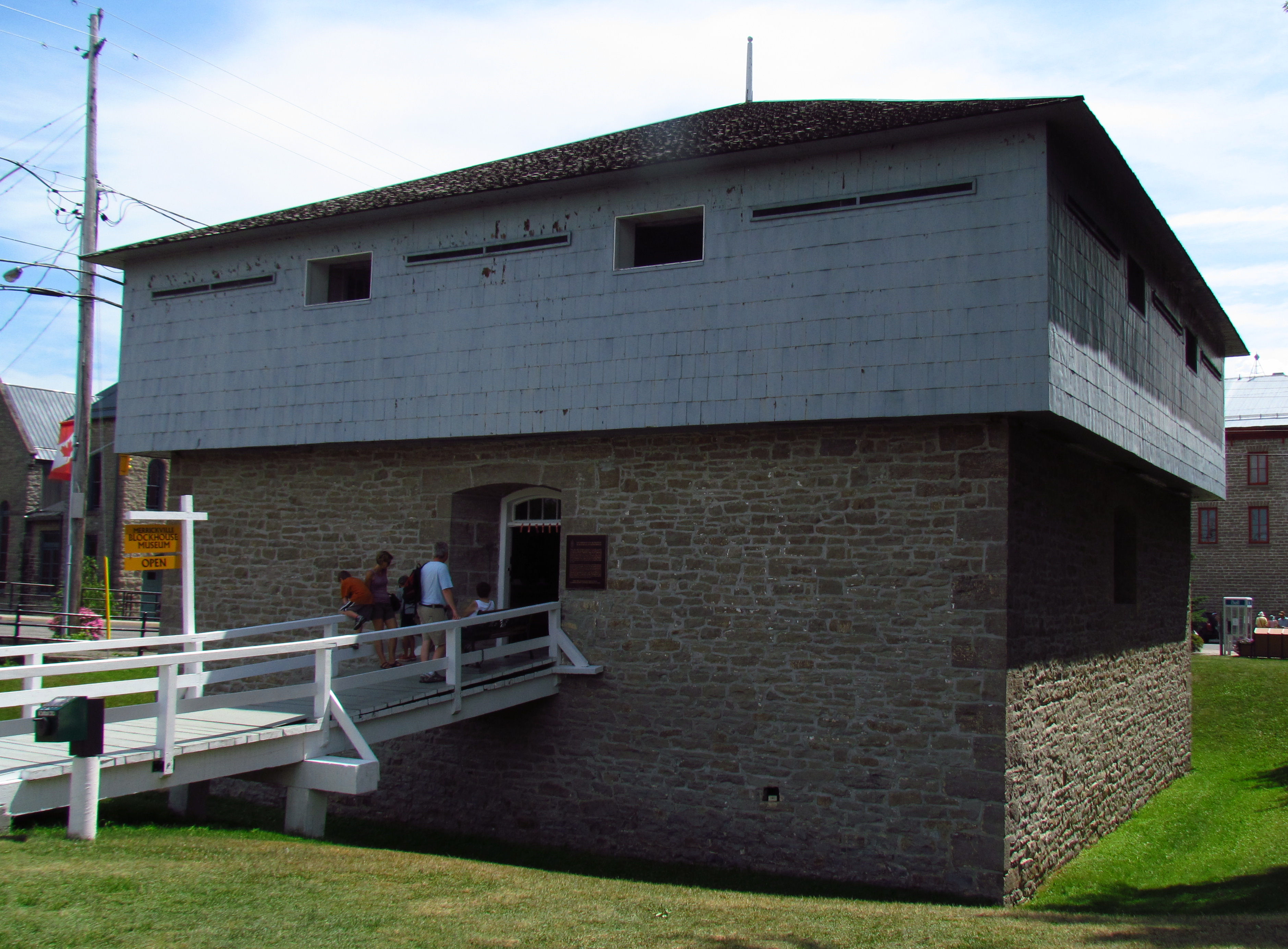
At Merrickville

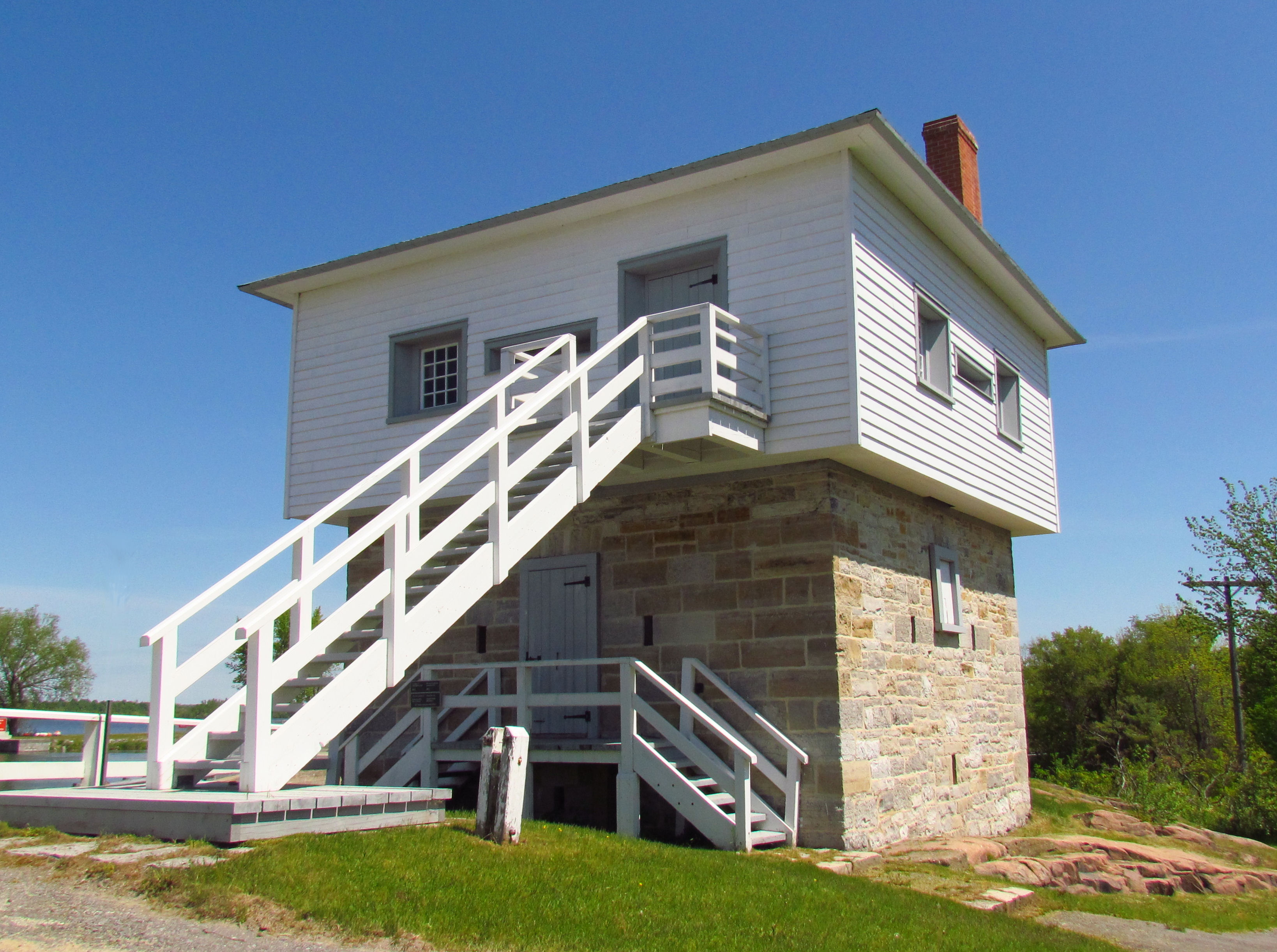
At Kingston Mills

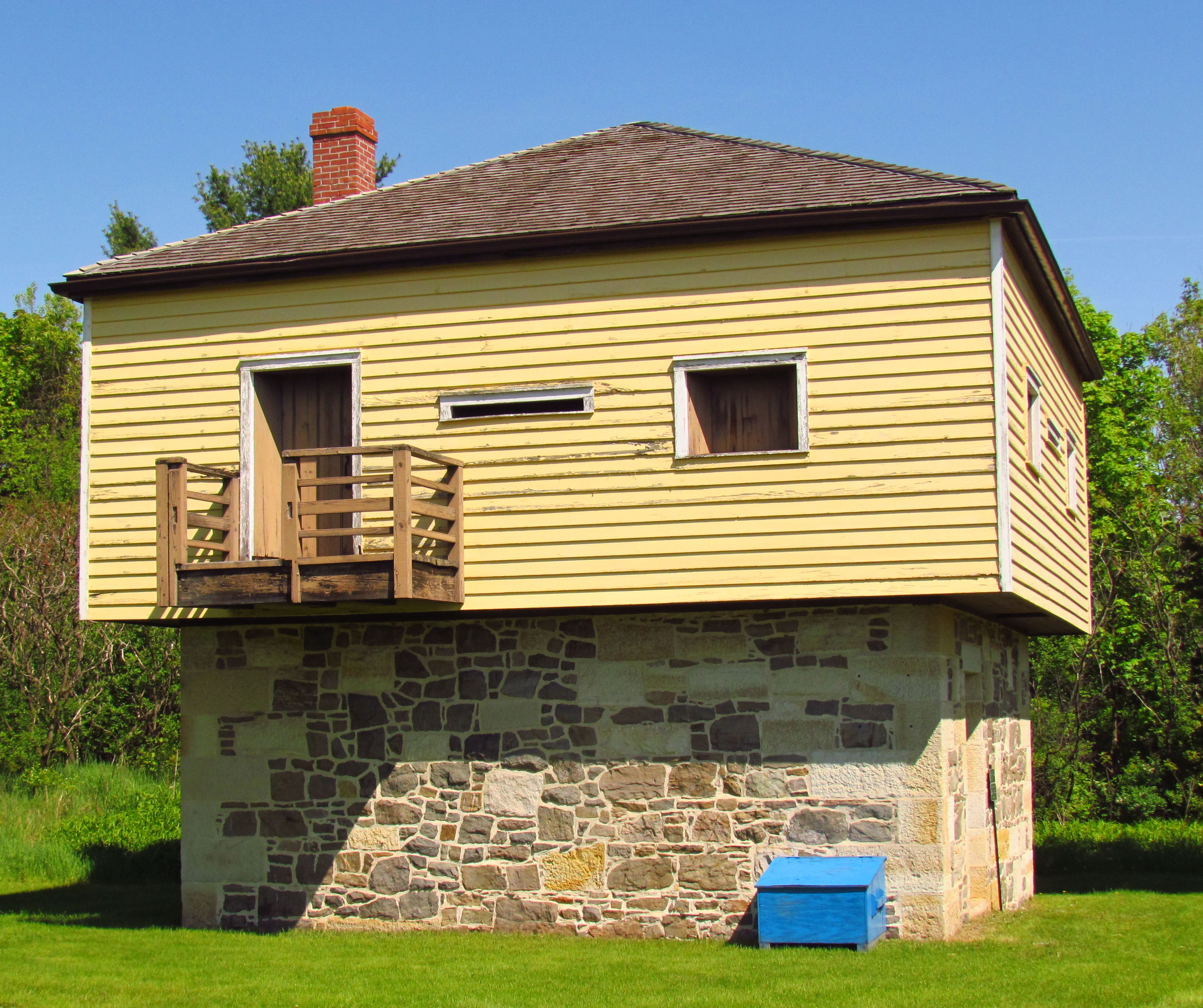
At Newboro

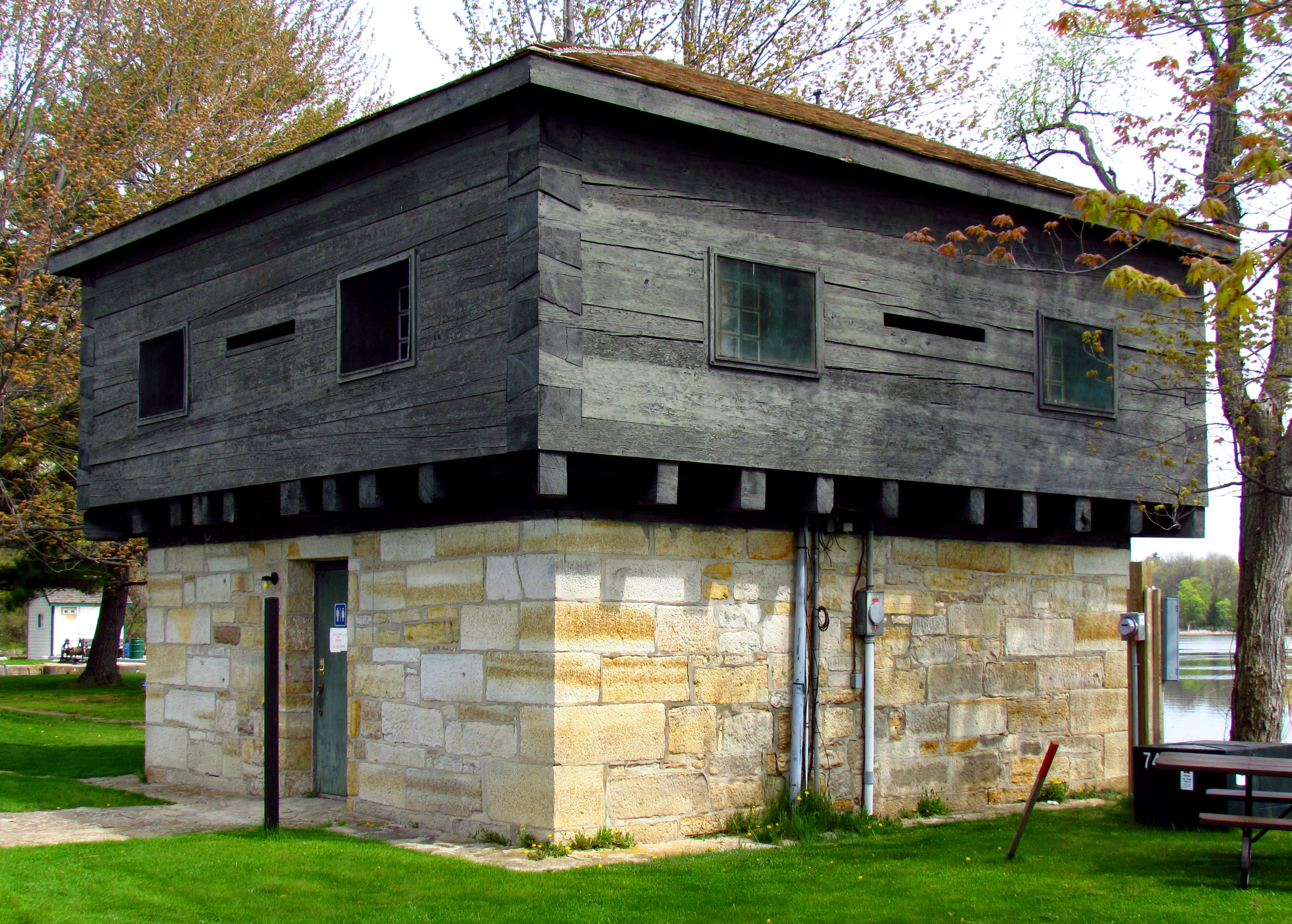
At Rideau Narrows

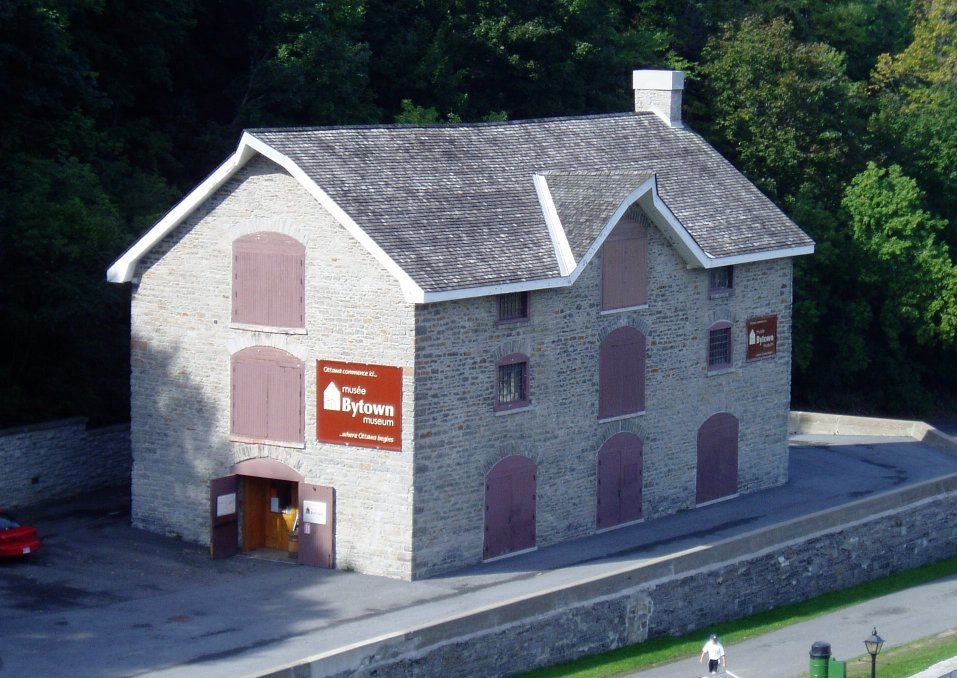
Commissariat Building

== Skateway ==
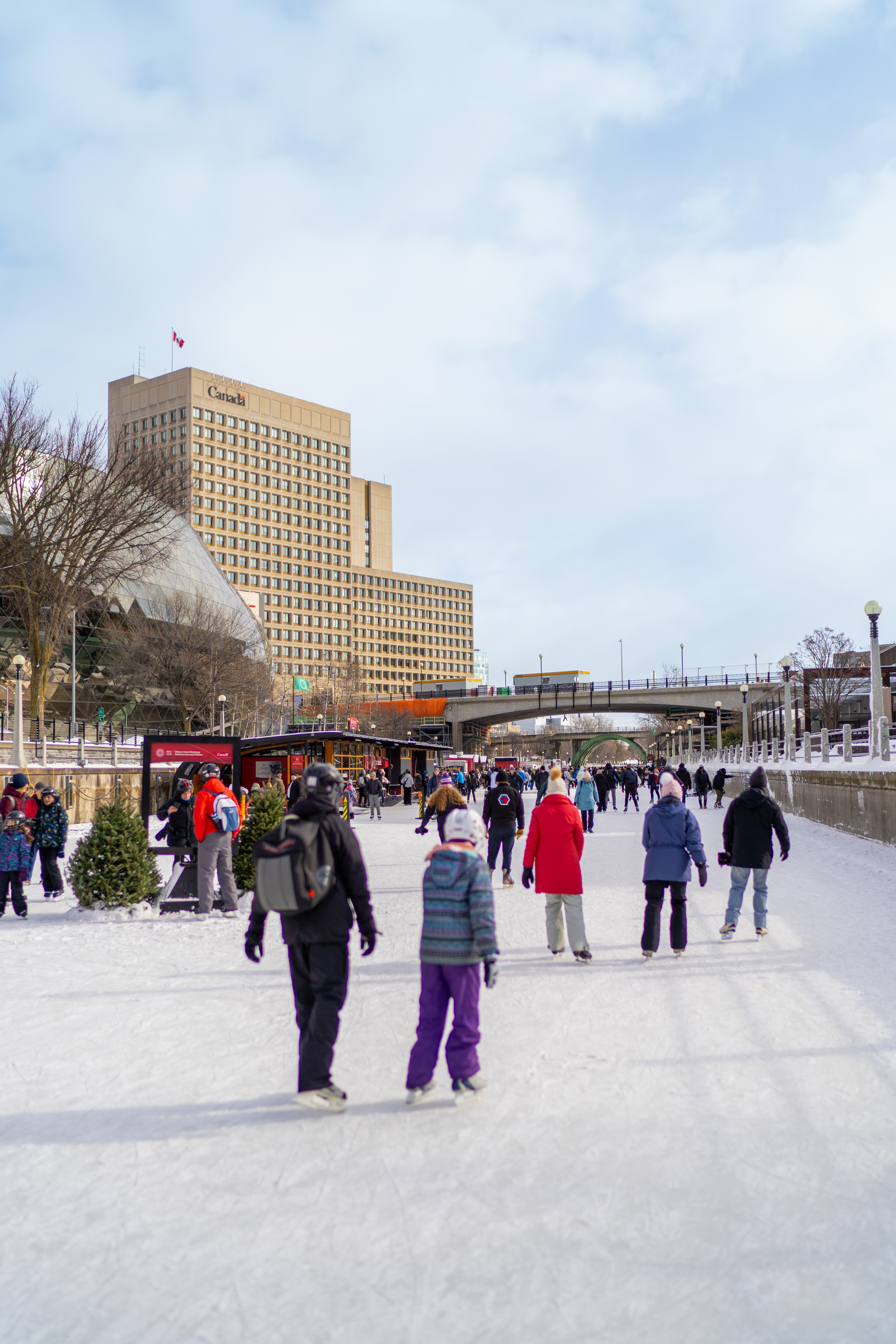
Rideau Canal Skateway 2025

Since the winter of 1970–71, the section of the Rideau Canal passing through central Ottawa has been re-purposed as what is officially the world's largest and second longest skating rink. The cleared length is 7.8 kilometres (4.8 mi) and has the equivalent surface area of 90 Olympic ice hockey rinks. It runs from the Hartwells Lockstation at Carleton University to the locks between the Parliament Buildings and the Château Laurier, including Dow's Lake in between. It serves as a popular tourist attraction and recreational area and is also the focus of the Winterlude festival in Ottawa.

Although some residents of Ottawa used the canal as an impromptu skating surface for years, the official use of the canal as a skateway and tourist attraction is a more recent innovation. As recently as 1970, however, city government of Ottawa considered paving over the canal to make an expressway. The federal government's ownership of the canal, however, prevented the city from pursuing this proposal. When Doug Fullerton was appointed chair of the National Capital Commission, he proposed a recreational corridor around the canal, including the winter skateway between Carleton University and Confederation Park.

The plan was implemented on January 18, 1971, despite opposition by city council. A small section of ice near the National Arts Centre was cleared by NCC employees with brooms and shovels, and 50,000 people skated on the canal the first weekend. Today the skating area of the canal is larger because of the equipment available for ice resurfacing and 24/7 maintenance crews. The skateway now has an average of one million visits per year. City councillor and author Clive Doucet credits this transformation of the canal with reinvigorating the communities of the Glebe, Old Ottawa East and Old Ottawa South.

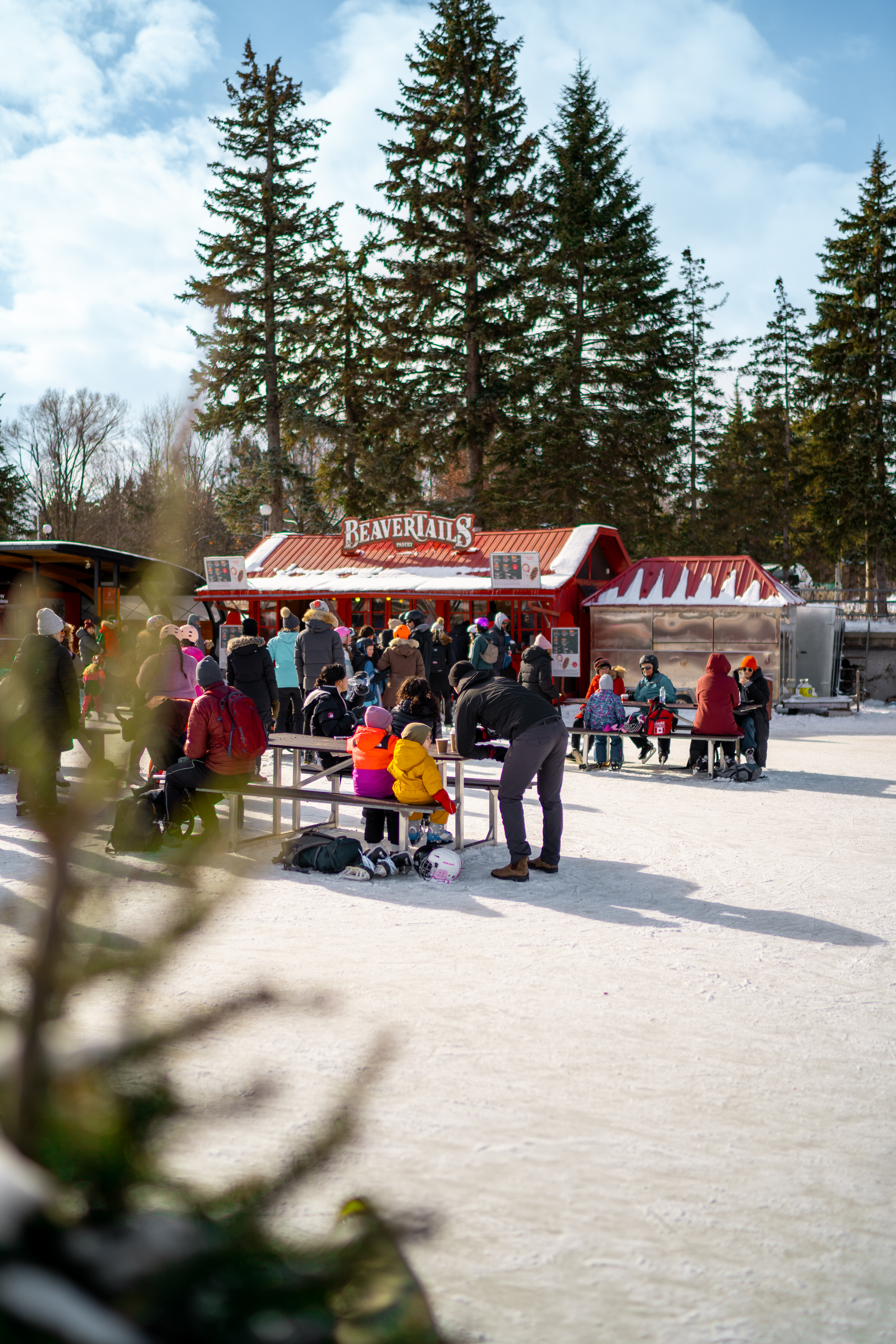
Beaver Tails kiosk on the canal

In January 2008, Winnipeg, Manitoba, achieved the record of the world's longest skating rink at a length of 8.54 kilometres but with a width of only 2 to 3 metres wide on its Assiniboine River and Red River at The Forks. In response, the Rideau Canal was rebranded as "the world's largest skating rink". The Rideau Canal Skateway was added to the Guinness Book of World Records in 2005 for being the largest naturally frozen ice rink in the world. Beaver Tails, a fried dough pastry, are sold along with other snacks and beverages, in kiosks on the skateway.

The Skateway is open 24 hours a day. The length of the season depends on the weather, but typically the Rideau Canal Skateway opens in late December or January and closes in March. Because of global warming, the region's average winter temperature has risen at an accelerating rate since the 1970s, which has gradually pushed back the opening day of skating and shortened the skating season. In 1971–1972, the Skateway's second winter, the skating season was 90 days long, which was its longest season. By 2022–23, warm temperatures combined with snow and rain led to the first ever season with zero skating days.

Before then, the 2015–2016 season was the shortest in which the Skateway was opened, being a mere 34 days long (and with only 18 skating days). On January 21, 2024, the canal opened for the first time in nearly two years, yet was only open for 10 days of skating before it closed for the season on February 25, marking the shortest skating season in which the canal actually opened.

Season	Opened	Closed	Days of skating
56th	December 31, 2025	March 4, 2026	56
55th	January 11, 2025	March 10, 2025	52
54th	January 21, 2024	February 25, 2024	10
53rd	—	—	0
52nd	January 14, 2022	March 5, 2022	41
51st	January 28, 2021	February 25, 2021	26
50th	January 18, 2020	February 26, 2020	31
49th	December 30, 2018	March 10, 2019	59
48th	January 5, 2018	February 21, 2018	35
47th	January 14, 2017	February 18, 2017	25
46th	January 23, 2016	February 25, 2016	16
45th	January 10, 2015	March 9, 2015	59
44th	December 31, 2013	March 11, 2014	58
43rd	January 18, 2013	February 28, 2013	38
42nd	January 15, 2012	February 22, 2012	26
41st	January 8, 2011	March 6, 2011	53
40th	January 14, 2010	February 26, 2010	36
39th	January 1, 2009	March 5, 2009	58
38th	January 25, 2008	March 5, 2008	34
37th	January 26, 2007	March 12, 2007	45
36th	January 7, 2006	March 10, 2006	39
35th	December 28, 2004	March 16, 2005	66
34th	January 14, 2004	February 28, 2004	46
33rd	January 3, 2003	March 16, 2003	66
32nd	February 2, 2002	March 8, 2002	26
31st	December 29, 2000	March 9, 2001	69
30th	December 31, 1999	February 23, 2000	55
29th	January 2, 1999	March 16, 1999	74
28th	December 21, 1997	March 2, 1998	46
27th	January 12, 1997	March 22, 1997	57
26th	January 1, 1996	February 23, 1996	47
25th	January 1, 1995	March 9, 1995	50
24th	December 30, 1993	March 11, 1994	72
23rd	December 29, 1992	March 1, 1993	63
22nd	December 28, 1991	March 6, 1992	70
21st	January 4, 1991	March 2, 1991	58
20th	December 24, 1989	February 22, 1990	61
19th	December 23, 1988	March 14, 1989	82
18th	January 4, 1988	March 7, 1988	64
17th	January 7, 1987	March 2, 1987	55
16th	December 27, 1985	February 23, 1986	59
15th	January 4, 1985	February 22, 1985	50
14th	December 25, 1983	February 17, 1984	55
13th	January 2, 1983	February 14, 1983	44
12th	December 27, 1981	February 21, 1982	57
11th	December 18, 1980	February 17, 1981	62
10th	January 1, 1980	February 22, 1980	43
9th	January 5, 1979	February 23, 1979	50
8th	December 29, 1977	March 9, 1978	71
7th	December 14, 1976	February 27, 1977	45
6th	December 20, 1975	February 26, 1976	69
5th	December 31, 1974	February 28, 1975	60
4th	January 1, 1974	February 28, 1974	59
3rd	December 25, 1972	1973	45
2nd	December 26, 1971	March 25, 1972	91
1st	January 18, 1971	February 26, 1971	40

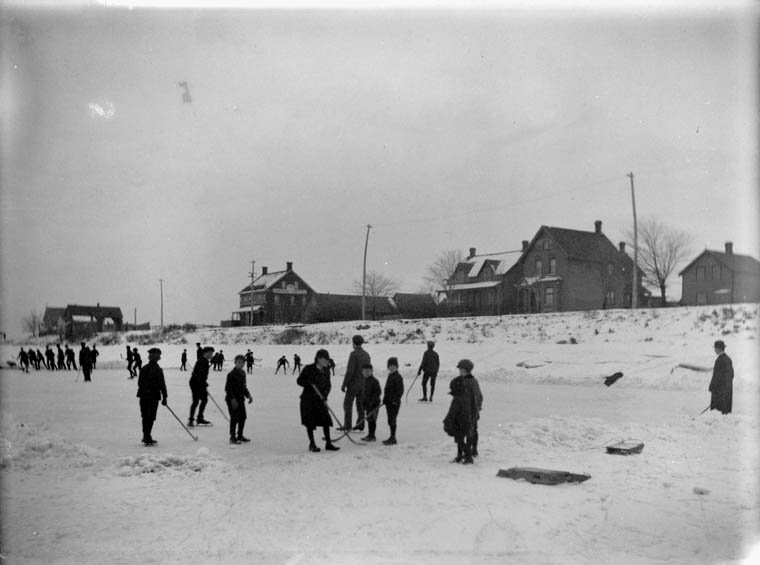
An ice hockey game on the canal on Christmas Day, 1901

=== Preparation and maintenance ===
The preparation for the Skateway starts as early as mid-October. At the end of the boating season, the water is drained at the Ottawa locks near Parliament by Parks Canada. Facilities on the ice such as shelters, chalets, and access ramps for vehicles are then installed. Next, "beams are placed at the locks, and the water is raised to skating level." After this step, the essentials are added such as stairs to access the ice, and hookups for both plumbing and electricity. The ice cap that forms as the canal freezes becomes the Rideau Canal Skateway. When the canal has built up a sufficient ice thickness, snow is removed from the ice surface and it is flooded in order to make the ice even more thick and smooth. Samples of ice are tested for quality and thickness. When it is safe to skate on, the Rideau Canal Skateway is opened for the season.

The Rideau Canal Skateway is maintained by the NCC (National Capital Commission). The ice is maintained by crews 24 hours a day, seven days a week. The snow and ice shavings are cleared off the surface every day and the ice surface is flooded each night with a "water dispersion machine" (weather permitting) to fill in any cracks caused by the contracting and expanding ice. These machines, known as Frosters, were unveiled in 2011 and were created because Zamboni ice resurfacers that are traditionally used in hockey rinks were too small and narrow for the Rideau Canal. There are approximately 20 holes along the side of the Skateway that flood the ice surface to make it smoother for skaters.

Two types of ice can form on the Rideau Canal Skateway, which are Rime Ice ("white ice") and "clear ice". White ice has a milky appearance with air bubbles, and is formed when snow and water mix and then freeze. White ice can also be formed by mechanically flooding the ice surface with water to increase the thickness of the ice cap. The other type of ice is called "clear ice", which has a colourless appearance and is formed when ice crystals build up below the frozen surface in cold temperatures. If snow accumulates on the ice it can negatively impact the conditions for skating. Snow depresses the ice surface and slows down the formation of ice crystals beneath the surface.

Ice conditions can be classified as very good, good, fair or poor. They are updated twice daily by the NCC. The ideal ("very good") conditions mean there are "a limited number of pressure cracks", the ice is very hard and durable overall, the ice surface is clean and smooth, there are a "limited number of rough areas", and there is a "very good gliding surface."

== See also ==
- Capital Pathway – the recreational pathway along the Rideau Canal
- Sainte-Anne-de-Bellevue Canal
- Saint Lawrence Seaway – Ontario–Quebec waterway system
- Tay Canal – a branch canal of the Rideau
- Trent-Severn Waterway – Central Ontario Canal System
- Welland Canal – Niagara region Canal System
