= Bytown Museum =

Museum in Ontario, Canada

Coordinates: 45.425809°N 75.697764°W

Bytown Museum Musée Bytown
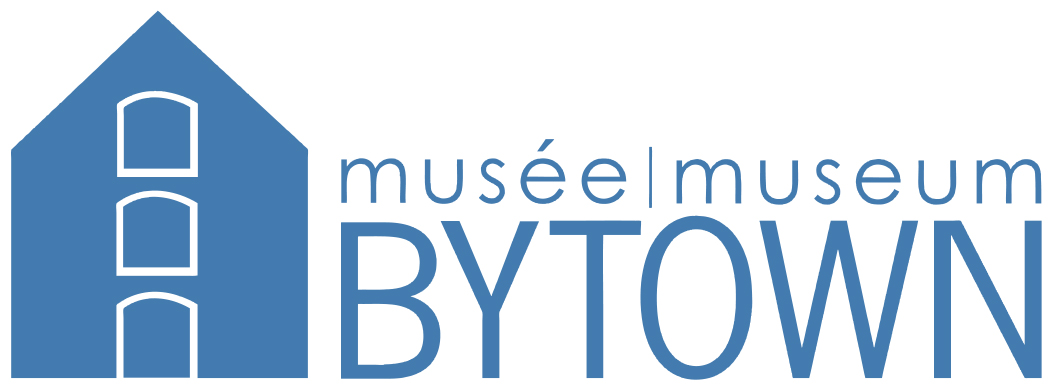

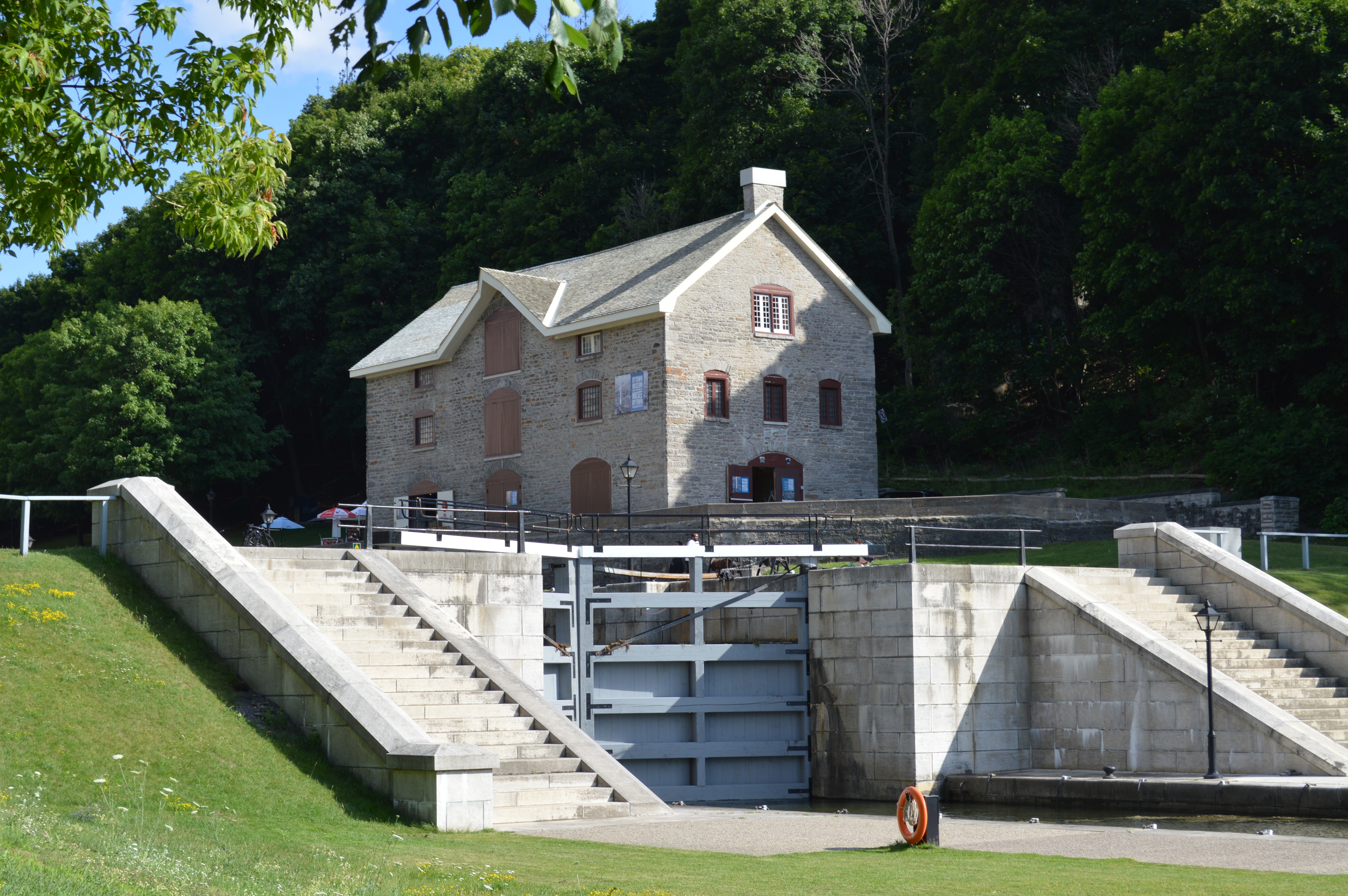
- Established: 1917
- Location: Ottawa, Ontario, Canada lower locks of the Rideau Canal on the Ottawa River just below Parliament Hill
- Type: Museum
- Director: Courtney Gehling
- Website: www.bytownmuseum.com/

The Bytown Museum (French: Musée Bytown) is a museum in Ottawa located in the Colonel By Valley at the Ottawa Locks of the Rideau Canal on the Ottawa River, just below Parliament Hill. Housed in the Commissariat Building, Ottawa's oldest remaining stone building, the museum provides a comprehensive overview of the origins of Bytown and its development and growth into the present city of Ottawa.

Founded in 1917 by the Women's Canadian Historical Society of Ottawa (WCHSO), the Bytown Museum was originally located in the former City Registry Office at 70 Nicholas Street, across from the Carleton County Gaol. The museum moved to its current location in 1951, and has since operated from the Commissariat Building, with the exception of a brief period from 1982 to 1985, when Parks Canada, the building's landlord, undertook renovations.

== History ==
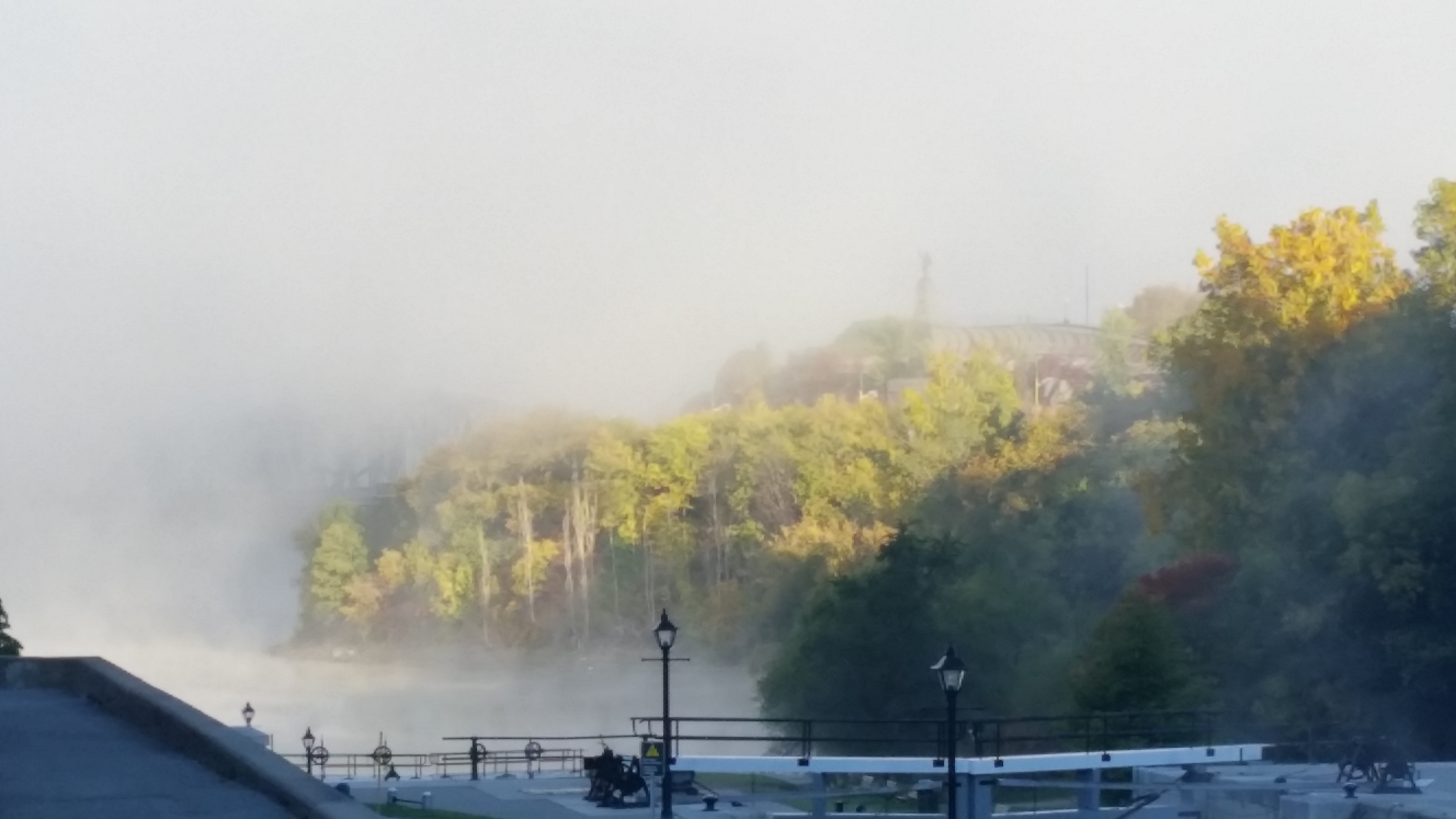
View from the Bytown Museum: Entrance Bay in Fall

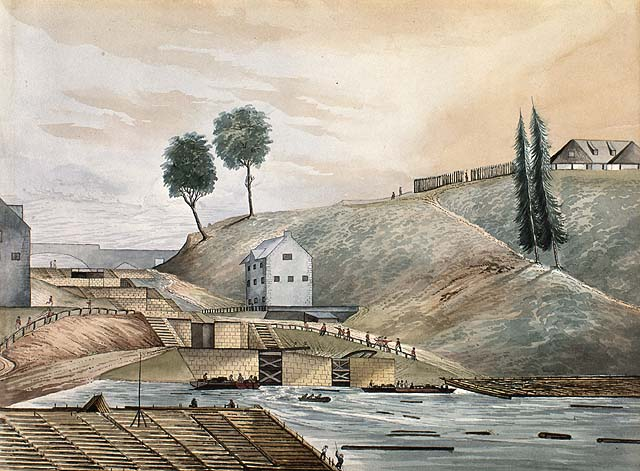
Museum's building in an 1839 painting

The museum first opened as the "Bytown Historical Museum" in 1917, in the former City Registry Office at 70 Nicholas Street, Ottawa. The Women's Canadian Historical Society of Ottawa (WCHSO), a group of some 30 women whose objective it was to advance the study of Canadian history and literature, had amassed a collection of artifacts, and were in need of a more permanent home. Founded in 1898, the WCHSO had presented and prepared papers on the history of Ottawa, and organized two Loan Exhibitions. The first exhibition, held in 1899 at 116 Sparks Street, included the tinted stone lithograph City of Ottawa, Canada West (c. 1859) by Stent and Laver Architects, and three photo-based engravings (1862) by Elihu Spencer depicting the construction of the Parliament and the Departmental Buildings. The second exhibition, held in 1906 at the National Art Gallery (today the National Gallery of Canada), then located on the second floor of the Victoria Hall on O'Connor Street, exhibited what was then believed to have been Samuel de Champlain's very own astrolabe (today in the collection of the Canadian Museum of History). Mayor Harold Fisher declared the building to be officially open at four o'clock on October 25, 1917. The building was used for meetings and as "a museum for relics and souvenirs."

Many Ottawa figures contributed to refurbishment of the space for the WCHSO: Thomas Ahearn provided appliances, J.R. Booth redid the floors, and the governor of the jail sent inmates across the street to paint and decorate the interior. The museum was housed in the Registry Building from 1917 to 1954. In 1951, the women secured a lease to the Commissariat Building, and began the long process of preparing the building for the collection and the move itself. By 1954, the move was complete.

When the Commissariat Building was closed from 1982 to 1985 by Parks Canada for restoration work, the museum was temporarily relocated to Wellington Street. The Historical Society of Ottawa (HSO) was responsible for the management of the museum until 2003, when a board of directors was established and the museum was registered as a not-for-profit charitable organization.

== Permanent Exhibition ==
The museum's permanent exhibition, Where Ottawa Begins, is spread over the second and third floors of the Commissariat Building. The second floor of the museum explores the history of the National Capital Region from the origins of European settlement in the area to the incorporation of Ottawa in 1855. The third floor continues the narrative by examining the development of the city of Ottawa, the social and cultural life of Victorian times, the assassination of Thomas D'Arcy McGee and the burning of the Parliament Buildings, as well as Canada's involvement in international conflicts.

The Temporary Gallery and Community Gallery are located on the second floor. The third floor houses "A Day in My Life," the museum's children's area.

== Gallery ==
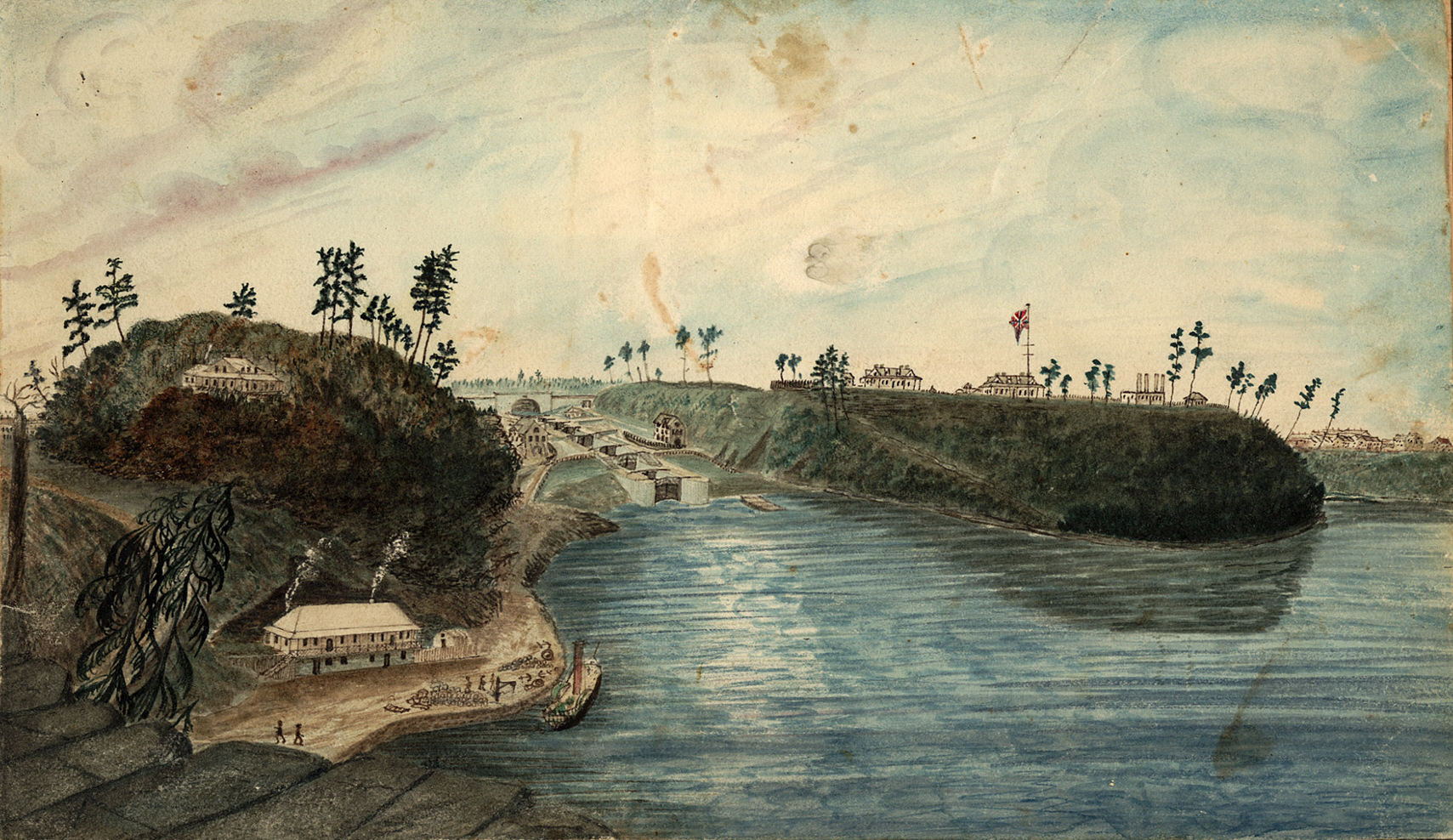
Commissariat building, shown in an 1834 painting, serves as the Bytown Museum

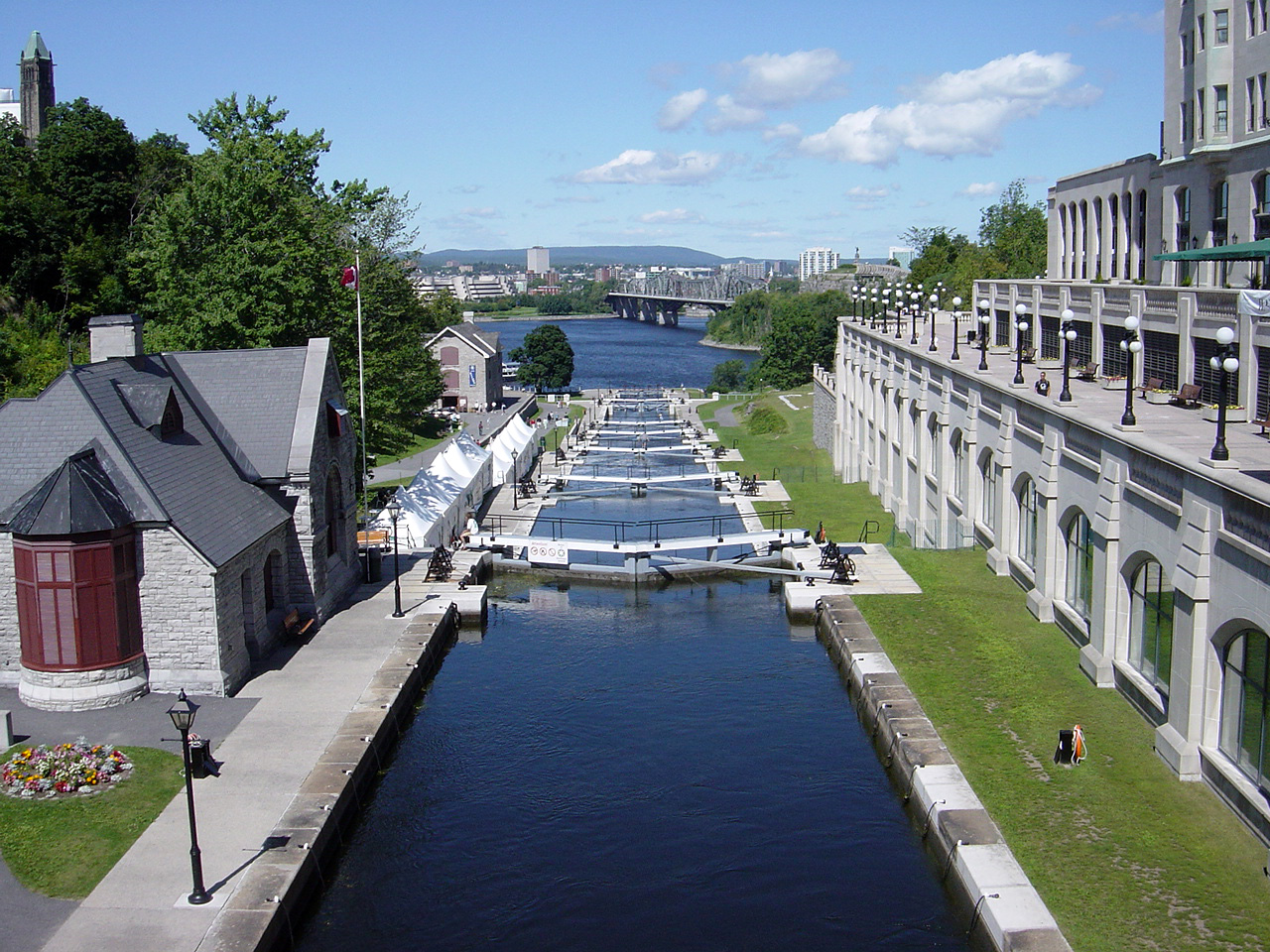
View of Rideau Canal & Bytown Museum

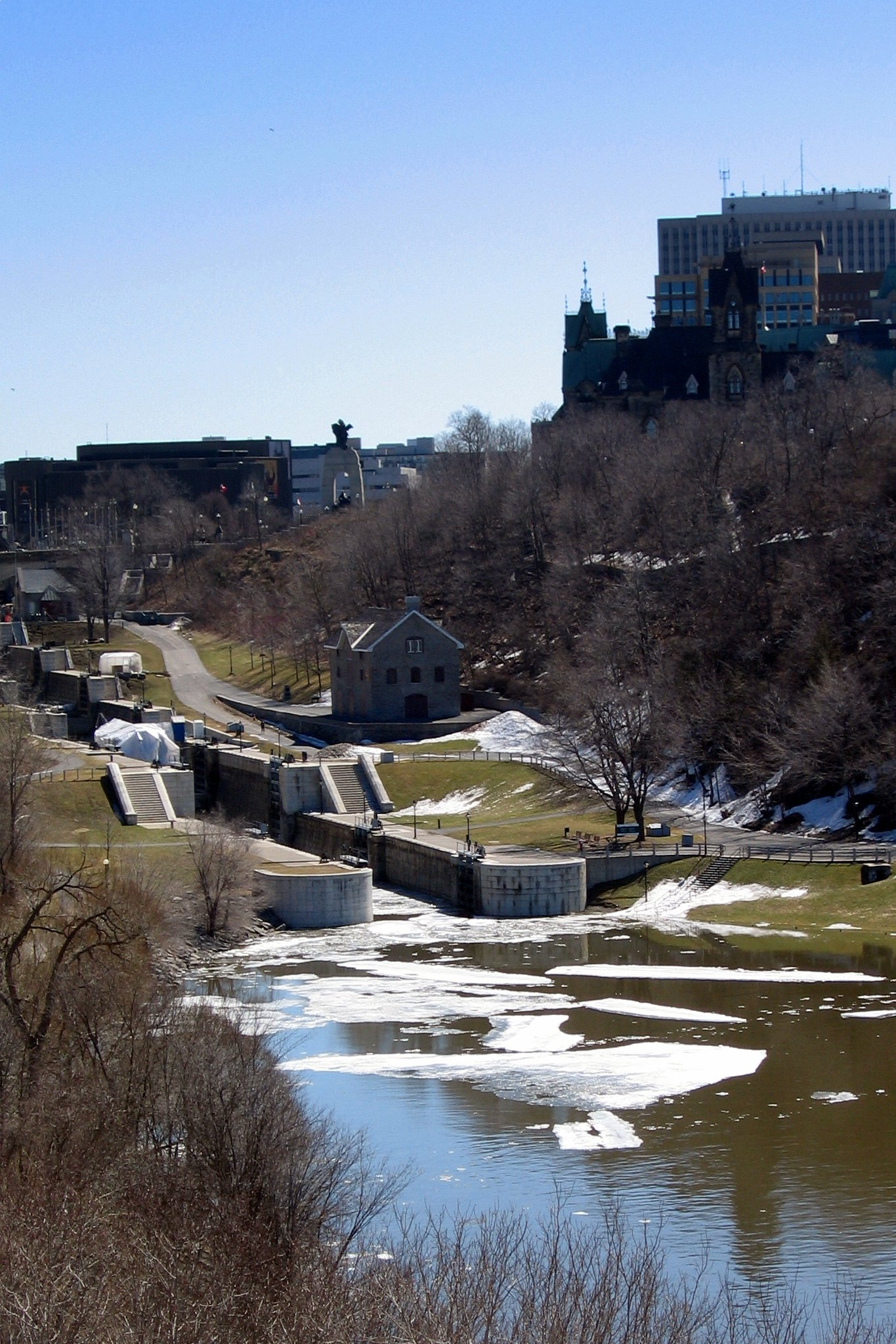
View of Rideau Canal & Bytown Museum

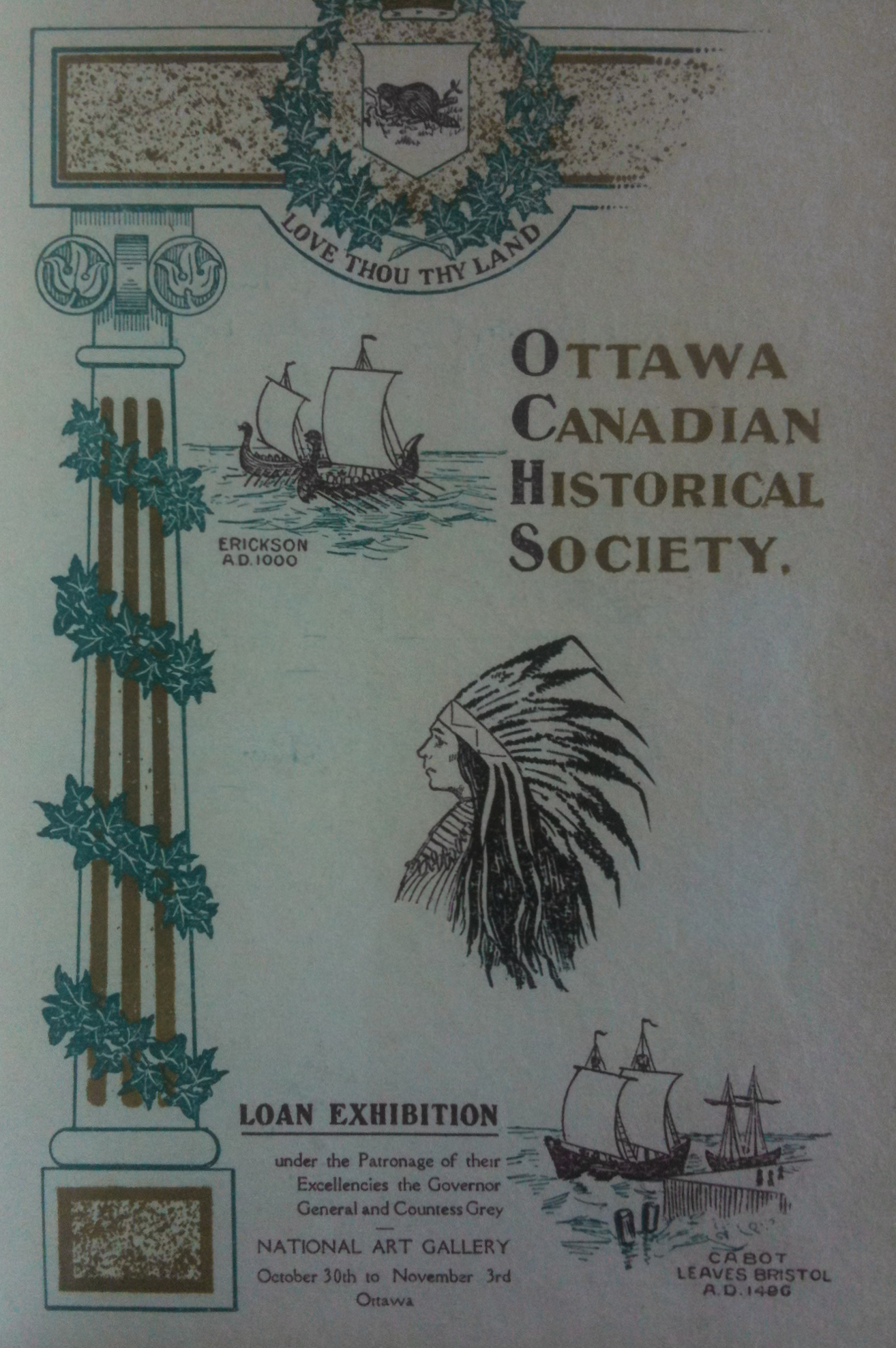
1906 Loan Exhibition held at the National Art Gallery, Ottawa (Cover of exhibit catalogue; published in 1907)

== See also ==
- History of Ottawa
