= Colonel By Valley =

Valley in Ottawa, Ontario, Canada

- Valley
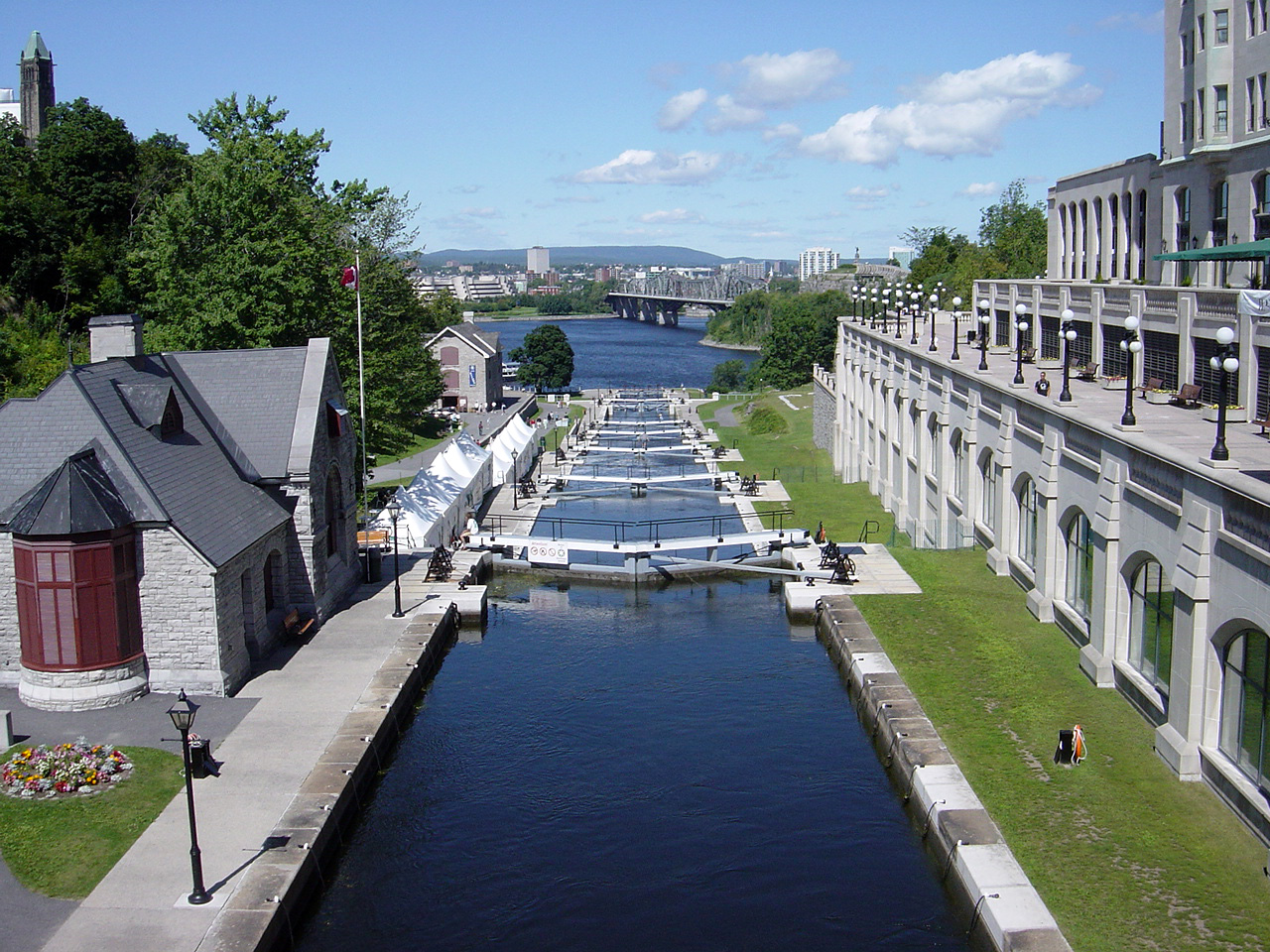

- Location within Ontario
- Coordinates: 45°25′35″N 75°41′52″W
- Location: Ottawa, Ontario, Canada
- Water bodies: Rideau Canal
- Geology: Valley
- Elevation: 45 m (148 ft)
- Topo map: NTS 31G5 Ottawa

The Colonel By Valley, also known as Entrance Valley is a valley located at the confluence of the Rideau Canal and the Ottawa River, in the heart of Ottawa, Ontario, Canada. The valley is flanked on the west by Parliament Hill and on the east by the Chateau Laurier. The valley is home to a lock flight known as the Ottawa Locks, comprising the first eight locks lifting the canal from the level of the Ottawa River. The valley is also home to the Commissariat Building, home of the Bytown Museum, the oldest stone building still standing in the city.

In celebration of the city's 150th anniversary, the valley was officially named in 1976 for Lieutenant-Colonel John By, who engineered the canal. The Canadian Geographical Names Committee and Parks Canada initially vetoed the name, as it did not consider the region to be a valley. However, a member of Heritage Ottawa, author and historian Bob Haig insisted on giving it a name, and used a map from 1828 which called the area "Canal Valley" as proof, and the Government of Ontario decided on giving the name to the valley. A plaque was unveiled on September 26 1976, 150 years to the day that By and the Earl of Dalhousie, the Governor of British North America, chose the site as the beginning of the canal.
