= Rideau Ferry Yacht Club Conservation Area =

Coordinates: 44.856652°N 76.136028°W

The Rideau Ferry Yacht Club Conservation Area or Rideau Ferry Conservation Area was established along a 10 acres (4.0 ha) shoreline property on the Lower Rideau Lake. The former Rideau Ferry Yacht Club donated the property in 1976 to provide a public recreation area with access to the lake.
