= Sandy Lake =

Sandy Lake may refer to:

== Lakes ==
=== Canada ===
- Sandy Lake (Alberta)
- Sandy Lake, County of Two Hills No. 21, Alberta
- Sandy Lake, Lac Ste. Anne County, Alberta
- Sandy Lake, Municipal District of Opportunity No. 17, Alberta
- Sandy Lake, Bowron Lake Provincial Park, British Columbia
- Sandy Lake (Manitoba)
- Sandy Lake (Nova Scotia)
- Sandy Lake (Ontario)
- Sandy Lake (Severn River)
- Sandy Lake (Trent Lakes)

=== United States ===
- Sandy Lake, Alaska Peninsula National Wildlife Refuge, Alaska
- Sandy Lake (Louisiana)
- Sandy Lake (Alaska)

== Communities ==
=== Canada ===
- Sandy Lake, Alberta
- Sandy Lake, Manitoba
- Sandy Lake, Ontario
  - Sandy Lake Airport, located adjacent to Sandy Lake, Ontario, Canada
  - Sandy Lake Water Aerodrome, located on Sandy Lake, adjacent to the Sandy Lake First Nation, Ontario, Canada
- Sandy Lake First Nation, independent Anisininew First Nation in Ontario, Canada

=== United States ===
- Sandy Lake, Louisiana
- Sandy Lake Indian Reservation, Minnesota
  - Sandy Lake, Minnesota
- Sandy Lake, Pennsylvania
- Sandy Lake Township, Mercer County, Pennsylvania
- Sandy Lake Band of Mississippi Chippewa, Native American tribe in Minnesota, United States
  - Sandy Lake Tragedy, the culmination in 1850 of a series of events centered in Sandy Lake, Minnesota

== See also ==
- Big Sandy Lake (disambiguation)
- Sandylake, a hamlet in Cornwall, England
