= List of lakes of Ontario =

This is an incomplete list of lakes in Ontario, a province of Canada. Ontario contains more than 250,000 lakes (including those forming part of the Great Lakes). The Great Lakes are a large binational system shared between Canada and the United States, which hold roughly 20% of the world’s fresh surface water; this figure reflects the volume of the Great Lakes as a whole, not the many smaller lakes across Ontario.

== Larger lake statistics ==

Ontario relief map

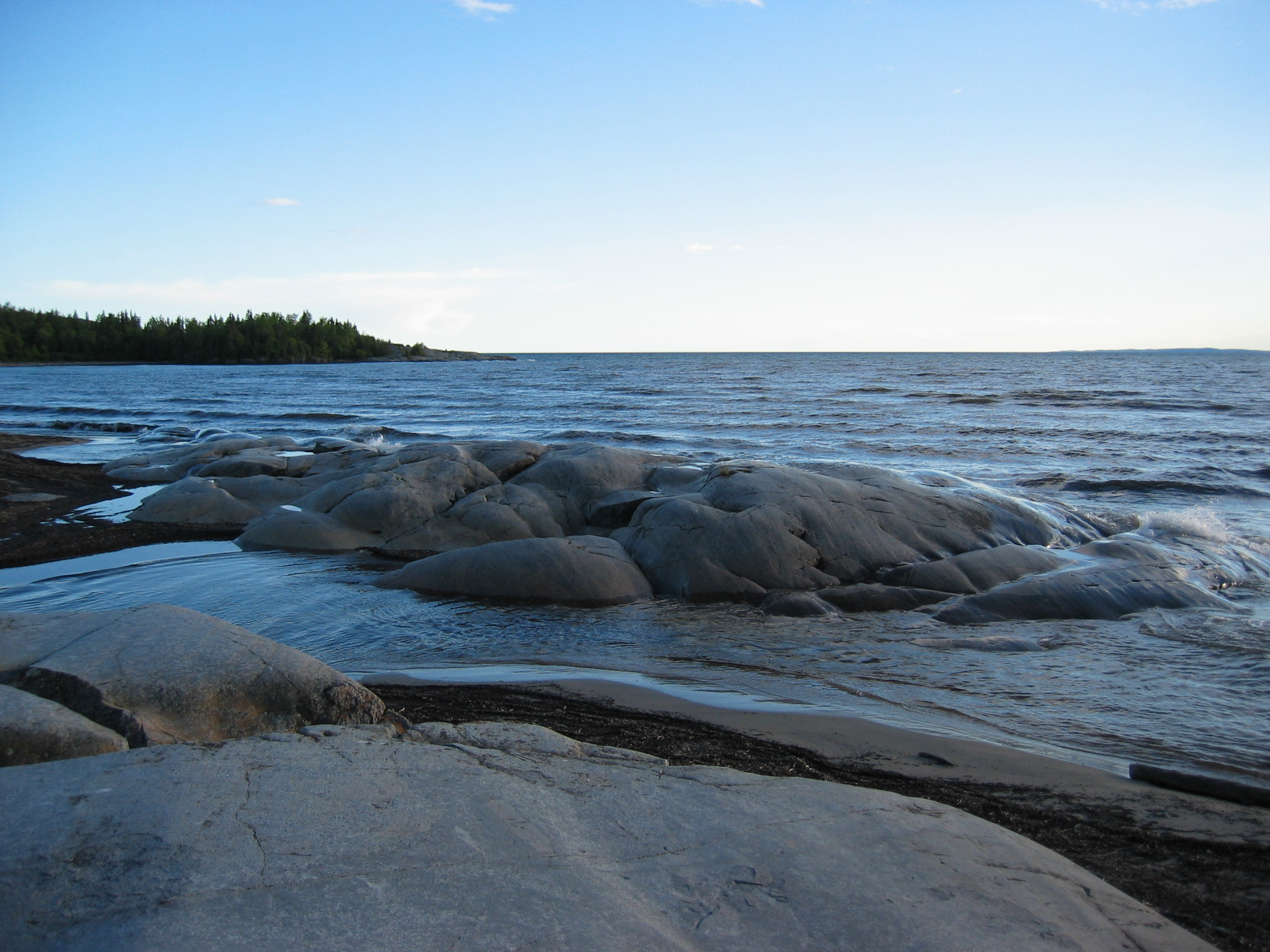
Lake Superior at Neys Provincial Park Ontario

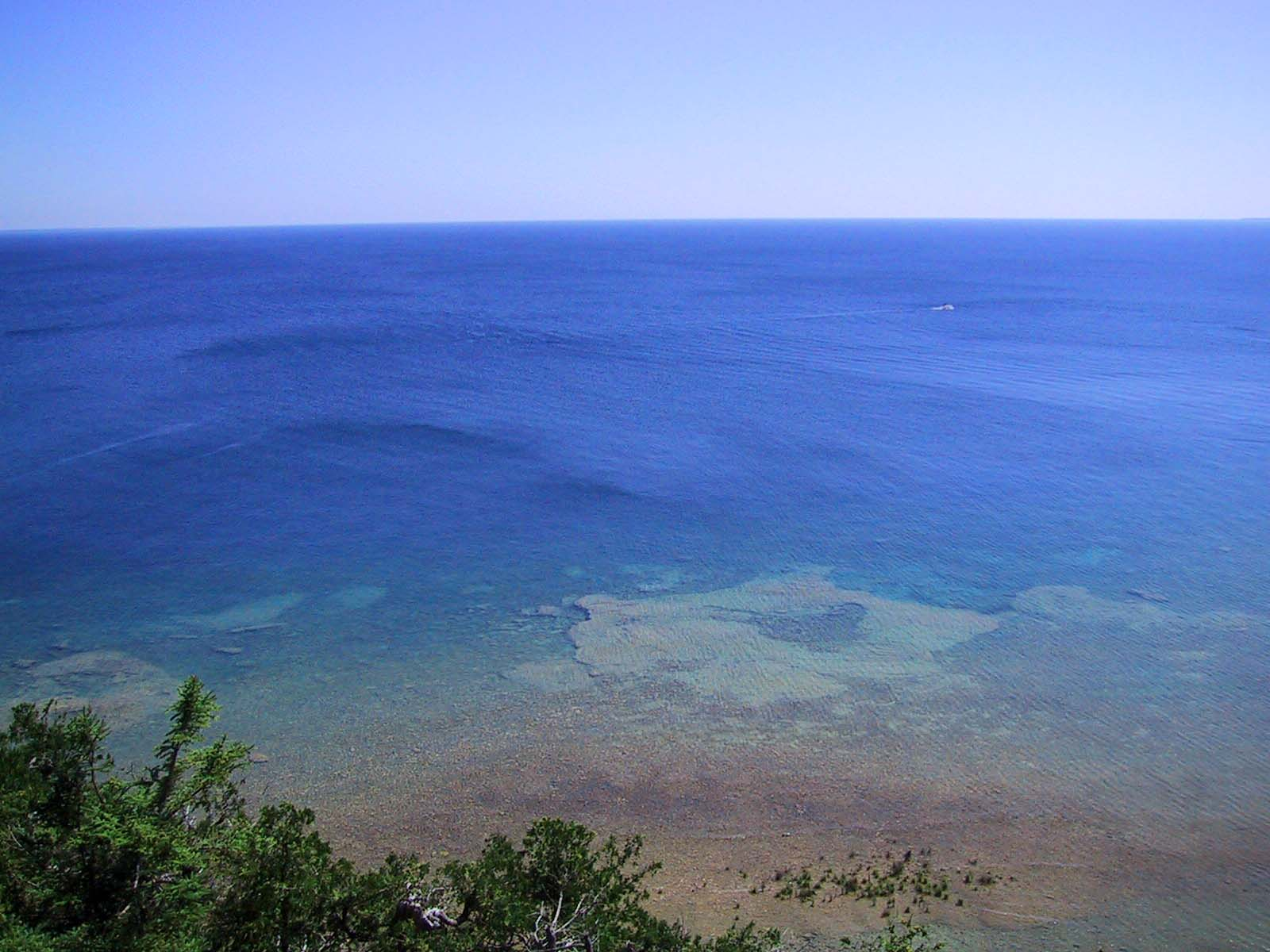
Lake Huron

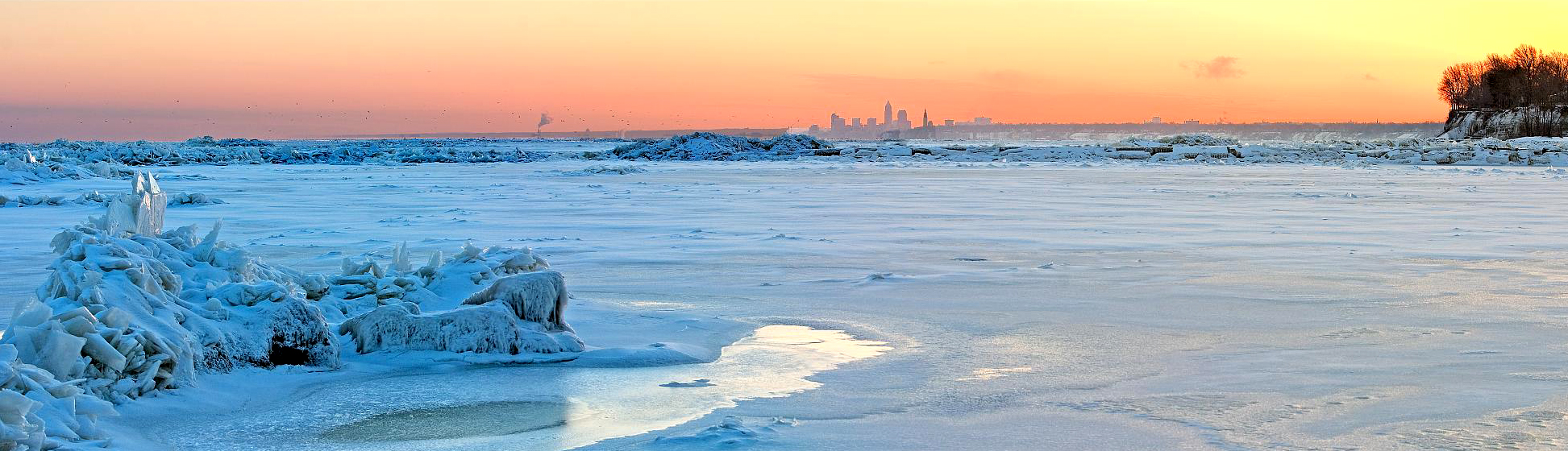
Frozen Lake Erie

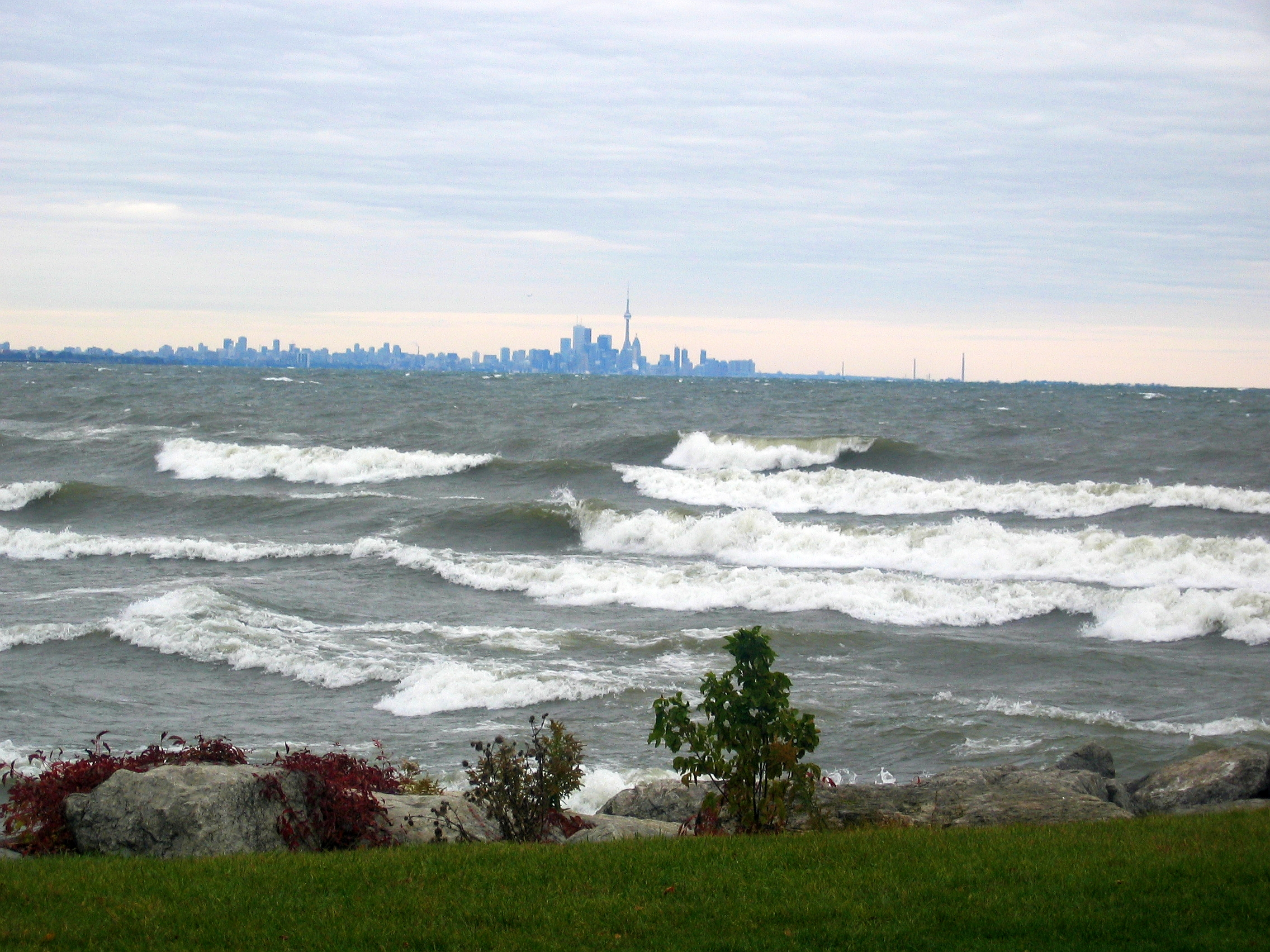
Looking east across Lake Ontario to Toronto

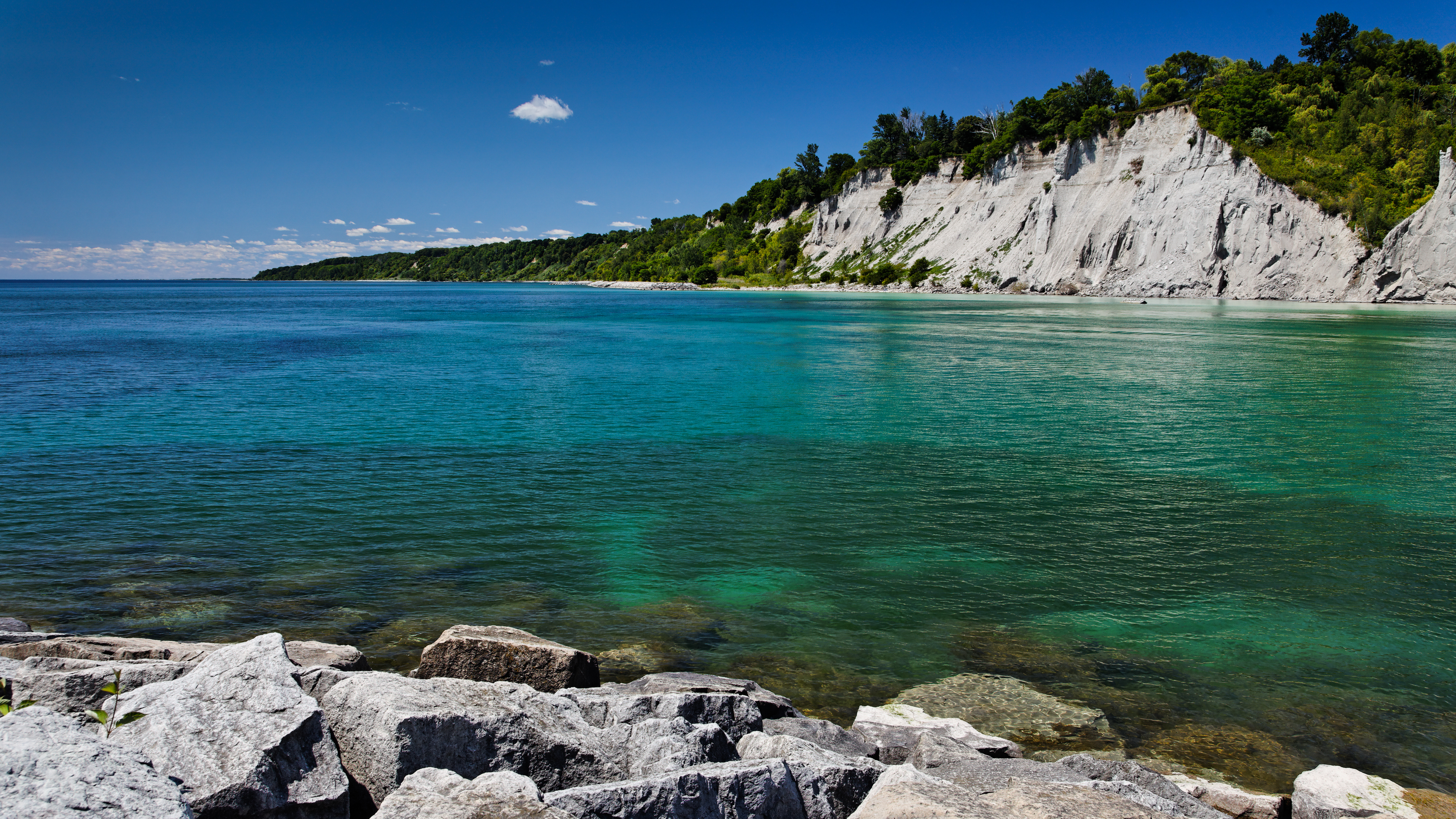
Scarborough bluffs Lake Ontario

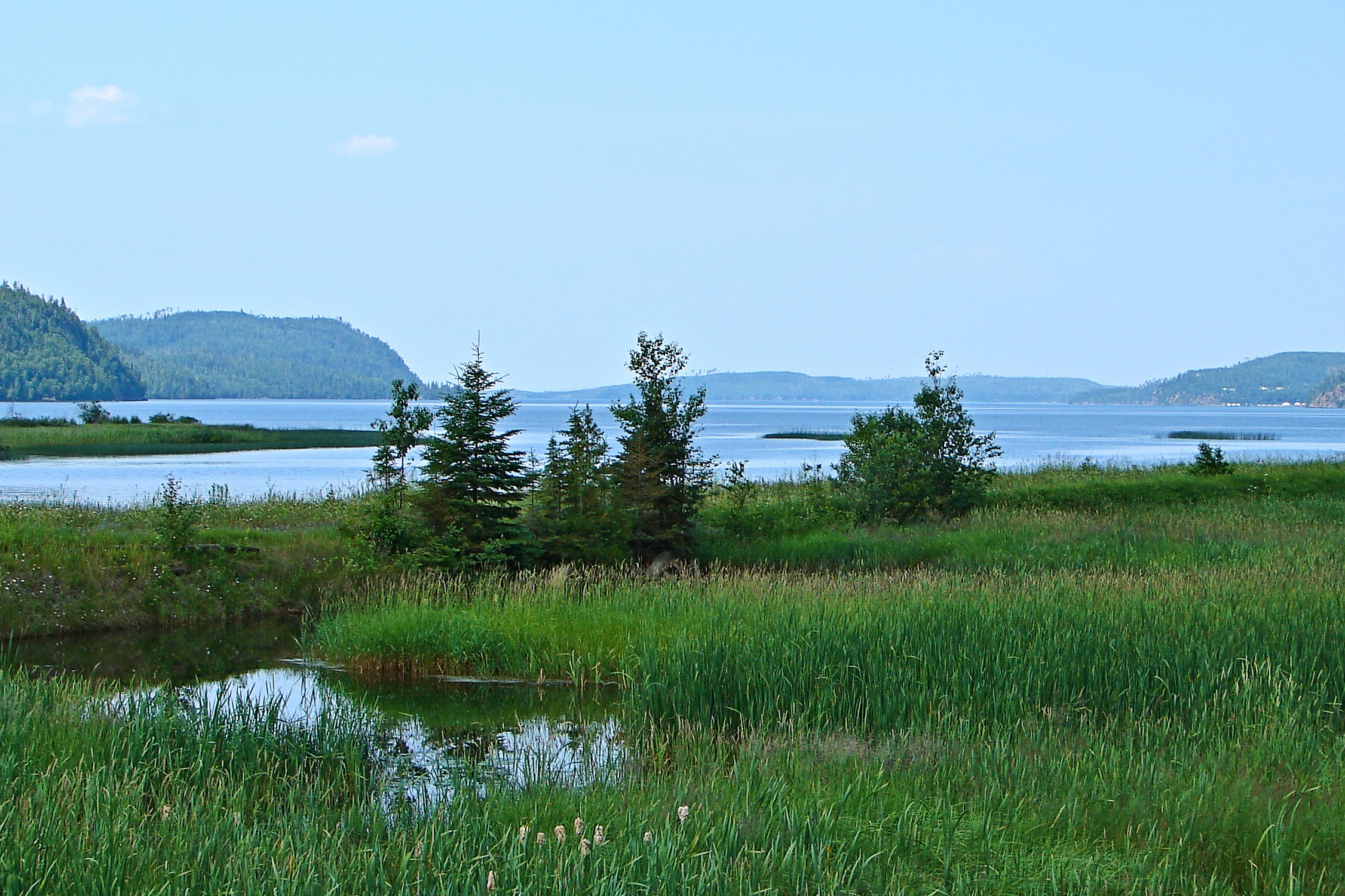
Lake Nipigon

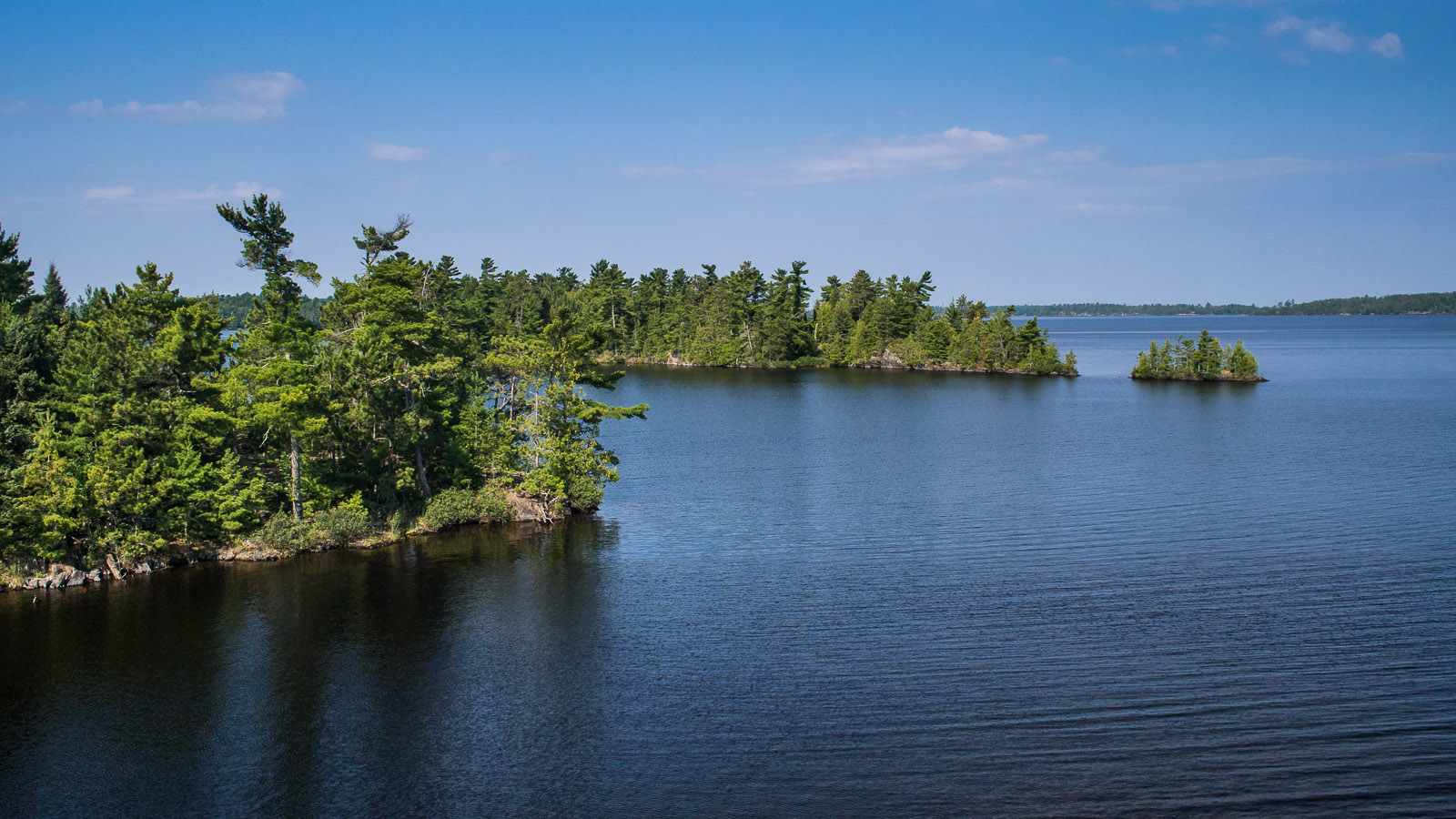
Rainy Lake from Tango Channel

This is a list of lakes of Ontario with an area larger than 400 km^{2} (150 sq mi).

Ontario lakes larger than 400 km^{2} (150 sq mi)
Lake	Area (including islands)	Altitude	Depth max.	Volume
Lake Superior	82,100 km^{2} (31,700 sq mi)	184 m (604 ft)	406 m (1,332 ft)	12,000 km^{3} (2,900 cu mi)
Lake Huron	59,600 km^{2} (23,000 sq mi)	177 m (581 ft)	229 m (751 ft)	3,543 km^{3} (850 cu mi)
Lake Erie	25,700 km^{2} (9,900 sq mi)	174 m (571 ft)	64 m (210 ft)	480 km^{3} (120 cu mi)
Lake Ontario	18,960 km^{2} (7,320 sq mi)	75 m (246 ft)	244 m (801 ft)	1,640 km^{3} (390 cu mi)
Lake Nipigon	4,848 km^{2} (1,872 sq mi)	260 m (850 ft)	165 m (541 ft)	248 km^{3} (59 cu mi)
Lake of the Woods	3,150 km^{2} (1,220 sq mi)	323 m (1,060 ft)	64 m (210 ft)	
Lac Seul	1,657 km^{2} (640 sq mi)	357 m (1,171 ft)	47.2 m (155 ft)	15 km^{3} (3.6 cu mi)
Lake St. Clair	1,114 km^{2} (430 sq mi)	175 m (574 ft)	8.2 m (27 ft)	3.4 km^{3} (0.82 cu mi)
Rainy Lake	932 km^{2} (360 sq mi)	338 m (1,109 ft)	50 m (160 ft)	
Lake Abitibi	931 km^{2} (359 sq mi)	265 m (869 ft)	10 m (33 ft)	
Lake Nipissing	832 km^{2} (321 sq mi)	196 m (643 ft)	69 m (226 ft)	3.8 km^{3} (0.91 cu mi)
Lake Simcoe	744 km^{2} (287 sq mi)	219 m (719 ft)	41 m (135 ft)	11.6 km^{3} (2.8 cu mi)
Big Trout Lake	661 km^{2} (255 sq mi)	213 m (699 ft)	39.6 m (130 ft)	
Sandy Lake	527 km^{2} (203 sq mi)	276 m (906 ft)	41.8 m (137 ft)	2.72 km^{3} (0.65 cu mi)
Lake St. Joseph	493 km^{2} (190 sq mi)	371 m (1,217 ft)		

== # ==
- 24 Mile Lake
- Lake 226
- Lake 227

== M ==
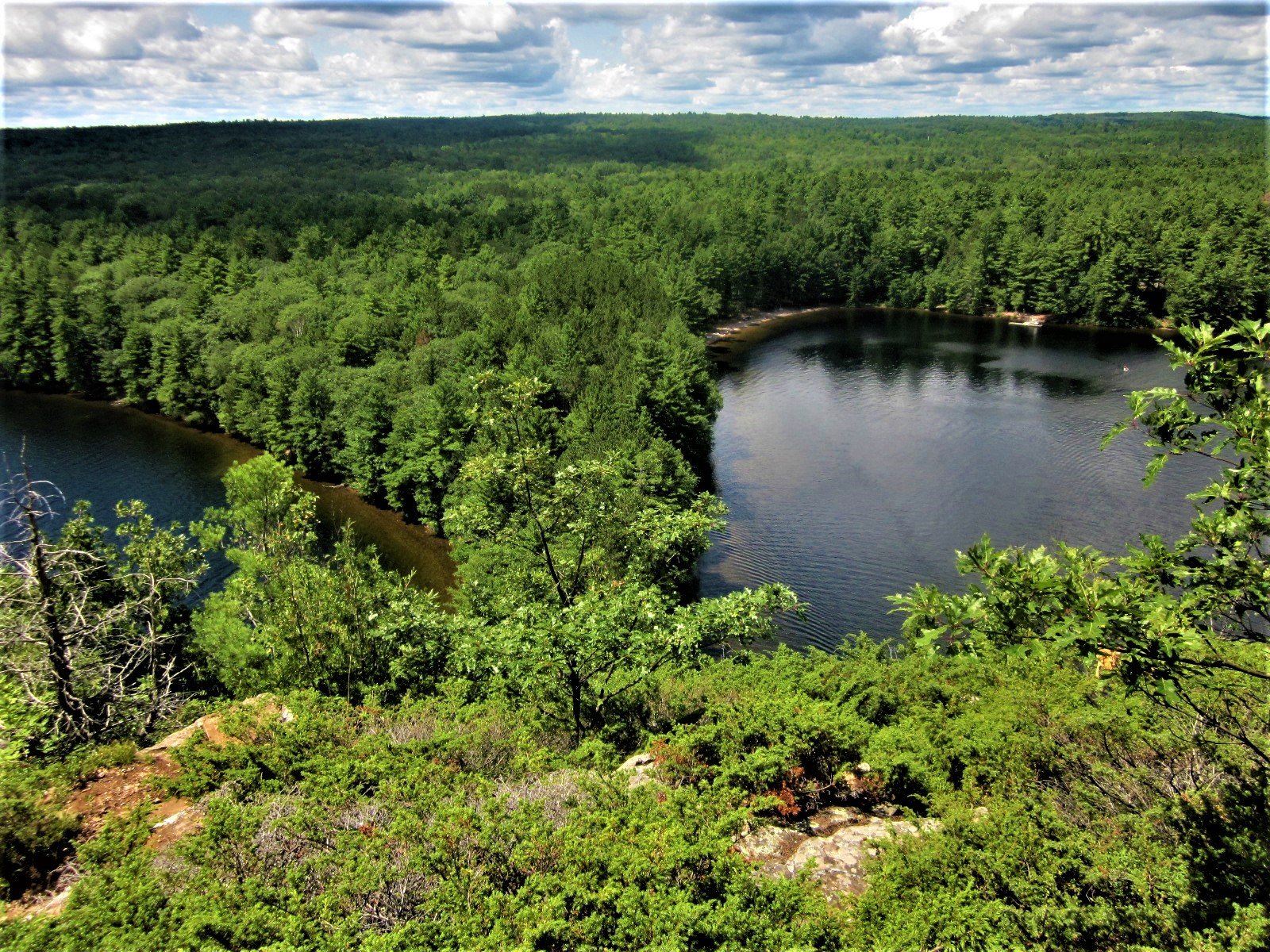
Mazinaw Lake

== O ==
- Oak Lake
- Oba Lake - North
- Oba Lake - South
- Octopus Lake
- Odessa Lake
- Lake Ogoki
- Old Man's Lake
- Onaman Lake
- Lake One
- Onigam Lake
- Onion Lake
- Lake Ontario
- Opeongo Lake
- Opinicon Lake
- Lac Orignal
- Otter Tail Lake
- Ottertooth Lake
- Otty Lake
- Ozhiski Lake

== P ==
- Packsack Lake
- Lake Panache
- Paint Lake
- Pakeshkag Lake
- Papineau Lake
- Lac Paradis
- Paudash Lake
- Peninsula Lake
- Perch Lake
- Pelican Lake
- Percy Lake
- Peters Lake (Sudbury District)
- Pierce Lake
- Pierre Lake
- Pike Lake
- Pigeon Lake
- Lac Pivabiska
- Lake Placid
- Lac à la Plonge
- Pog Lake
- Pokei Lake
- Lac Pomerleau
- Portage Lake
- Pot Lake
- Priamo Lake
- Professor's Lake
- Pumphouse Lake
- Puslinch Lake
- Pine Lake

== R ==
- Rainbow Lake
- Rainy Lake
- Lake Ramsey
- Lac Rancourt
- Rebecca Lake, multiple lakes
- Redbridge Lake
- Red Cedar Lake
- Red Squirrel Lake
- Redstone Lake (Haliburton County)
- Redstone Lake (Sudbury District)
- Restoule Lake
- Rice Lake
- Ril Lake
- Riley Lake (Kenora District)
- Riley Lake (Muskoka)
- Lac du Rocher-Fendu
- Rock Lake (Algonquin Park)
- Rock Lake (Kenora District)
- Lake Rosalind
- Lake Rosseau
- Round Lake
- Ruth Lake

== S ==
- Lac aux Sables
- Sachigo Lake
- Saint Francis (Lac Saint-François)
- Salerno Lake
- Salmon Lake
- Sand Lake, numerous lakes by this name
- Sand Pits Lake
- Sandy Lake (Algoma District)
- Sandy Lake
- Saskatchewan Lake
- Savant Lake
- Sawyer lake
- Lake Scugog
- Lake Seneca
- Seseganaga Lake
- Lac Seul
- Severn Lake
- Seymour Lake (disambiguation), several lakes by this name
- Sharbot Lake
- Shibogama Lake
- Shoal Lake
- Shutze Lake
- Silver Lake (Manitoulin Island)
- Lake Simcoe
- Six Mile Lake
- Skeleton Lake
- Skootamatta Lake
- Loch Smith
- Smoke Lake (Algonquin)
- Smoothrock Lake
- Snider Lake
- Soap Lake
- South Summit Lake
- Sparrow Lake
- Spotter Lake
- Spring Lake
- Lake St. Anthony
- Lake St. Clair
- Lake Ste. Marie
- Lac Ste.-Thérèse
- Steel Lake
- Steve Lake
- Lake St. Francis
- Lake St. George
- Lac St. Jean
- Lake St. John
- St. Joe Lake
- Lake St. Joseph
- Lake St. Lawrence
- Stoco Lake
- Lake St. Patrick
- Lake St. Peter
- Stony Lake
- Sturgeon Lake
- Sunfish Lake
- Lake Superior
- Sydenham Lake
- Syrette Lake

== T ==
- Lake Talon
- Tangamong Lake
- Lake Temagami
- Tetapaga Lake
- Tetu Lake
- The Third Lake
- Thirty Island Lake
- Lake Timiskaming
- Lac Tonnerre
- Lake Travers
- Triangle Lake (Ontario)
- Trout Lake (Algoma District)
- Trout Lake (Nipissing District)
- Tunnel Lake
- Turtle Lake
- Twelve Mile Lake (Ontario)
- Lake Twentythree
- Twin Narrows Lake
- Two Islands Lake
- Twoline Lake
- Lake of Two Mountains
- Lake of Two Rivers

== U ==
- Ulster Lake (Kenora District)
- Upper Algocen Lake
- Upper Beverley Lake
- Upper Nishin Lake
- Upper Redwater Lake
- Upper Rideau Lake
- Umfreville Lake

== V ==
- Lake la Vase
- Lake Vernon
- Lac Viau
- Lake Victoria

== W ==
- Wabatongushi Lake
- Wabigoon Lake
- Lake Wabukayne
- Wahwashkesh Lake
- Wanapitei Lake
- Wapikopa Lake
- Wawa Lake
- Weagamow Lake
- West Shining Tree Lake
- Whiddon Lake
- Lake Whittaker
- White Lake
- Whiteclay Lake
- White Otter Lake
- Whitewater Lake
- Widdifield Lake
- Willard Lake
- Windermere Lake
- Wintering Lake
- Windigo Lake
- Windy Lake
- Winisk Lake
- Wolfe Lake
- Lake Wolsey
- Wood Lake
- Lake of the Woods (Kenora District)
- Lake of the Woods (Manitoulin District)
- Wrist Lake
- Wunnummin Lake

== Y ==
- Yorkend Lake

== Z ==
- Lac de Zajac
- Zionz Lake
