= Brightsand River =

- Mouth of the Brightsand River in Ontario

Location
- Country: Canada
- Province: Ontario
- Region: Northwestern Ontario
- District: Thunder Bay
- Part: Thunder Bay, Unorganized

Physical characteristics
- Source: Pakashkan Lake
  - coordinates: 49°27′41″N 90°21′17″W
  - elevation: 465 m (1,526 ft)
- Mouth: Allan Water
  - location: Allanwater Bridge
  - coordinates: 50°14′26″N 90°09′35″W
  - elevation: 417 m (1,368 ft)

Basin features
- Progression: Brightsand→ Allan Water→ Ogoki→ Albany→ James Bay
- River system: James Bay drainage basin

The Brightsand River is a river in the James Bay drainage basin in Unorganized Thunder Bay District in northwestern Ontario, Canada.

Most of the river is protected in the Brightsand River Provincial Park. The river's headwaters are protected in the Garden Pakashkan Conservation Reserve.

== Geography ==
The river begins at Outlet Bay on Pakashkan Lake about 45 kilometres (28 mi) northeast of the community of Upsala. It flows north through Brightsand Lake and further to Wapakaimaski Lake. The river splits with one channel flowing west into Seseganaga Lake and further into Kawaweogama Lake; the other flows north through Antler Lake and McEwan Lake. The two combine again to form the river Allan Water at the community of Allanwater Bridge, the location of Allanwater Bridge railway station, served by Via Rail transcontinental Canadian trains, on the Canadian National Railway transcontinental main line.

=== Tributaries ===
- Hilltop Creek (left)
- Rude Creek (left)
- Globe Creek (right)
- Sparrow Creek (right)
- Grid Creek (left)
- Bluebird Creek (right)
- Ermine Creek (left)
- Aylsworth Creek (right)
- Wawang River (left)
- Pakashkan Lake (source)

== Brightsand River Provincial Park ==
Brightsand River Provincial Park
- IUCN category II (national park)
- Interactive map of Brightsand River Provincial Park
- Coordinates: 49°48′19″N 90°16′58″W
- Length: 130 km (81 mi)
- Area: 41,250 ha (159.3 sq mi)
- Designation: Waterway
- Established: 1989
- Governing body: Ontario Parks
- Website: www.ontarioparks.com/park/brightsandriver

The Brightsand River Provincial Park is a linear waterway park that includes a 200 metres (660 ft) wide strip of land on both sides of roughly 130 kilometres (81 mi) long section of the Brightsand River and its lakes, from Aylsworth Lake (near the Graham Road crossing) to its mouth at the Allan Water River. It was established in May 1989 to protect a recreational waterway that also provides an important link with other provincial parks and conservation areas.

The park is representative of a glaciated Precambrian landscape, with typical boreal forest. Notable aspects include a variety of interesting glacial features and 10 known rock art sites. It borders on the Upper English River Conservation Reserve to the west, Kopka River Provincial Park to the east, and Wabakimi Provincial Park to the north.

It is a non-operating park without any services. The only facilities include a total of 200 backcountry campsites. The park is used for recreational activities such as boating, canoeing, fishing, hiking, swimming, and hunting.

== See also ==
- List of rivers of Ontario
