= Peters Lake =

Peters Lake may refer to:

- Peters Lake (Frontenac County), Ontario, Canada
- Peters Lake (Parry Sound District), Ontario, Canada
- Peters Lake (Sudbury District), Ontario, Canada
