= Nicholls Lake =

Lake in Ontario, Canada

- Location within Ontario
- Location: Thunder Bay District, Ontario
- Coordinates: 50°25′08″N 88°47′04″W
- Primary inflows: Whitesand River
- Primary outflows: Whitesand River
- Basin countries: Canada
- Max. length: 1.9 km (1.2 mi)
- Max. width: .4 km (0.25 mi)
- Surface elevation: 318 m (1,043 ft)

Nicholls Lake is a lake in Thunder Bay District, Ontario, Canada. It is 1.9 kilometres (1.2 mi) long and .4 kilometres (0.2 mi) wide. The lake lies on the Whitesand River at an elevation of 318 metres (1,043 ft) between Selassie Lake upstream and the mouth of Blackett Creek downstream, and about 21 kilometres (13 mi) northeast of the community of Armstrong.
