= Whiddon Lake (Ontario) =

Lake in Canada

- Location within Ontario
- Location: Thunder Bay District, Ontario
- Coordinates: 50°25′14″N 88°51′07″W
- Primary outflows: Unnamed creek to the Whitesand River
- Basin countries: Canada
- Max. length: 1.7 km (1.1 mi)
- Max. width: .7 km (0.43 mi)
- Surface elevation: 332 m (1,089 ft)

Whiddon Lake is a lake in Thunder Bay District, Ontario, Canada. It is 1.7 kilometres (1.1 mi) long and .7 kilometres (0.4 mi) wide and lies at an elevation of 332 metres (1,089 ft) about 18.5 kilometres (11.5 mi) northeast of the community of Armstrong. The primary outflow is an unnamed creek that joins the Whitesand River at a point between the mouth of Blackett Creek upstream and Whitesand Lake downstream.
