= Kawaweogama Lake =

Lake in Ontario, Canada

- Location within Ontario
- Location: Thunder Bay District, Ontario, Canada
- Coordinates: 50°11′49″N 90°11′10″W
- Primary inflows: Brightsand River
- Primary outflows: Allan Water
- Basin countries: Canada
- Max. length: 10.5 km (6.5 mi)
- Max. width: 9.6 km (6.0 mi)
- Surface area: 51 km^{2} (20 sq mi)
- Surface elevation: 411 m (1,348 ft)

Kawaweogama Lake is a lake in the James Bay drainage basin in Unorganized Thunder Bay District in northwestern Ontario, Canada, about 35 kilometres (22 mi) east of the community of Savant Lake on Highway 516, 80 kilometres (50 mi) west of Armstrong on Highway 527, and 210 kilometres (130 mi) northwest of Thunder Bay. Except for the northwestern shore, the lake is encompassed by Brightsand River Provincial Park.

== Hydrology ==
The lake is the end of the western branch of the Brightsand River arriving from the direction of Seseganaga Lake and immediately from Sunray Lake; the inflow is at the southwest. The outlet channel at the north combines with the eastern branch of the Brightsand River arriving as the outlet from McEwan Lake to form the river Allan Water. The Allan Water flows via the Ogoki River and Albany River to James Bay.

There is one named island in the lake, Star Island. The line of an esker runs intermittently north–south through the east side of the lake, the continuation of an esker on land to the north of the lake.

== Settlements ==
The (uninhabited) community of Allanwater Bridge is just beyond the north end of the lake.

== Transportation ==
Allanwater Bridge station is at Allanwater Bridge. It is on the Canadian National Railway (CN) transcontinental main line where it crosses the river Allan Water, and is a stop on Via Rail's Canadian train service. The CN mainline also crosses the northern tip of the lake west of Allanwater Bridge.
