= Smoothrock Lake =

- Location in Ontario
- Location: Thunder Bay District, Ontario
- Coordinates: 50°32′24″N 89°25′25″W
- Type: Lake
- Part of: James Bay drainage basin
- Primary outflows: Unnamed river
- Basin countries: Canada
- Max. length: 31 kilometres (19.3 mi)
- Max. width: 23 kilometres (14.3 mi)
- Surface elevation: 351 metres (1,152 ft)

Smoothrock Lake is a lake in the Unorganized Part of Thunder Bay District in Northern Ontario, Canada. It is in the James Bay drainage basin and lies in Wabakimi Provincial Park. The lake has three major inflows: the Caribou River at Caribou Bay at the east; and the Boiling Sand River and the Lookout River, at the south. A secondary inflow is Berry Creek at the southwest. The main outflow is the Berg River from Outlet Bay at the north centre, and leads north to the Ogoki River. A secondary outflow, unnamed and at the northeast, heads from Lonebreast Bay north through a series of lakes to Whitewater Lake, further downstream on the Ogoki River. The Ogoki River flows via the Albany River to James Bay.

== Tributaries ==
Clockwise from the Berg River outflow

- Caribou River
- Boiling Sand River
- Lookout River
- Berry Creek

== See also ==
- List of lakes in Ontario
