= 2009 Southern Ontario tornado outbreak =

Largest single-day tornado outbreak in Ontario history

Coordinates: 43.851°N 79.535°W

Meteorological history
- Date: August 20, 2009

Tornado outbreak
- Tornadoes: 19
- Max. rating: F2 tornado

Overall effects
- Casualties: 1 fatality, numerous injuries
- Areas affected: Southwestern Ontario, Central Ontario, Greater Toronto Area

The 2009 Southern Ontario tornado outbreak was a series of severe thunderstorms that spawned numerous tornadoes in Southwestern Ontario, Central Ontario and the Greater Toronto Area (GTA) on August 20, 2009, and was the largest single-day tornado outbreak in Ontario history and the largest in Canadian history. During the afternoon and evening, 19 tornadoes touched down with four of them producing F2 damage. One F2 struck the town of Durham where significant damage occurred and one person was killed; two F2s struck the city of Vaughan, just north of Toronto, damaging hundreds of homes; another F2 devastated apple orchards and resort areas near Thornbury. The number of tornadoes associated with this event surpasses that of August 2, 2006, which saw 18 documented tornadoes. In addition, it was one of the most destructive and costly tornado events ever in the province, and included one fatality, one of only a handful of deadly tornadoes in Ontario's recent memory. At one point, over 10 million people in Southern Ontario, one-third of Canada's population, were placed under tornado watches and/or warnings as the storms rolled through.

== Meteorological events ==
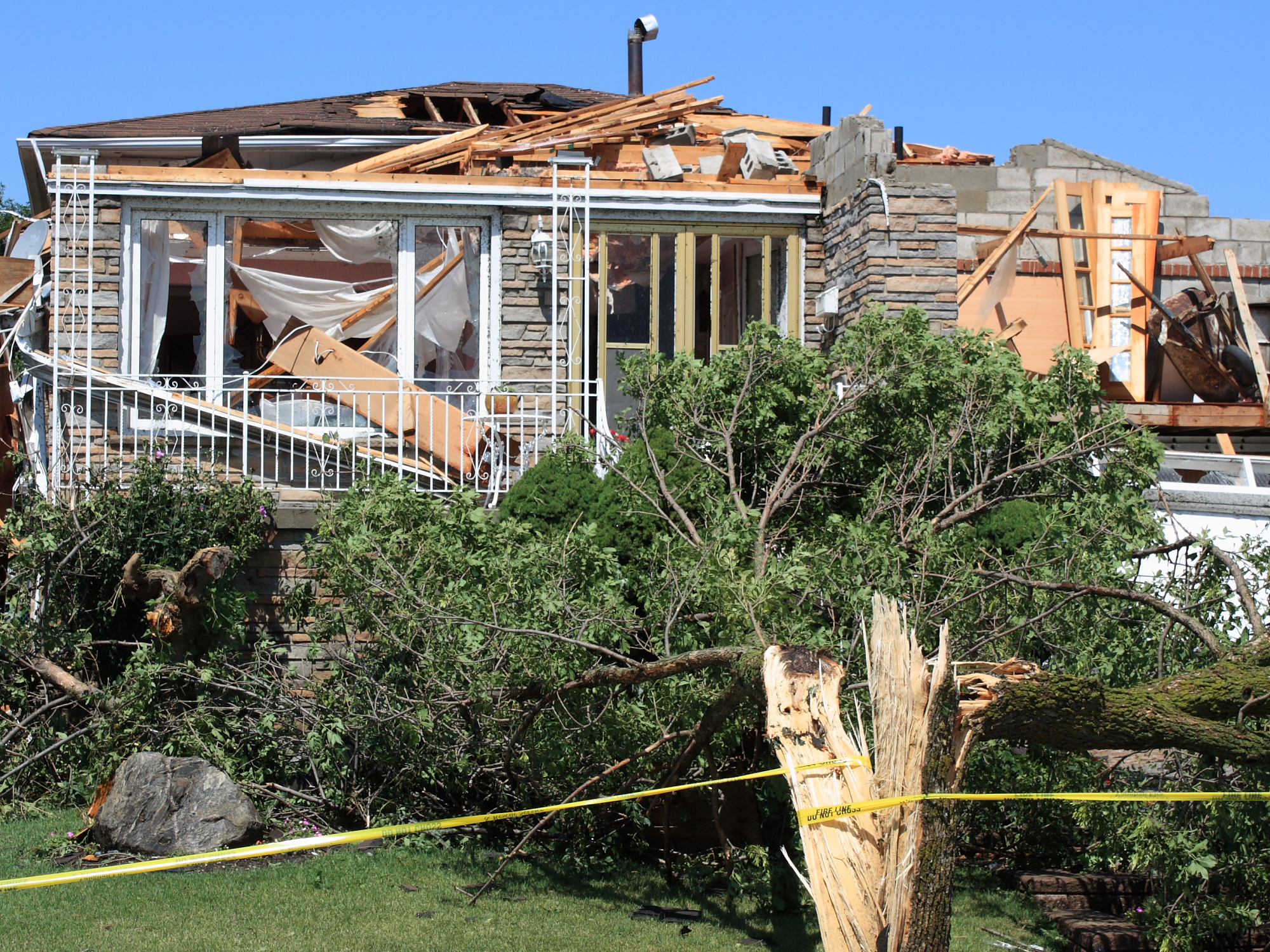
A severely damaged home in Vaughan sustains powerful F2 damage at 34 Houston Rd.

During the afternoon of August 20, 2009, a series of supercell thunderstorms began to develop over southeast Michigan, increasing in number as they moved into western sections of Southwestern Ontario. Beginning at around 3:00pm, the storms rapidly strengthened, with a particularly intense cell forming to the south of Lake Huron. This storm passed into Ontario, and travelled to the northeast through Huron County and into Grey County, moving towards the town of Durham. The first tornado touchdown occurred about 14 km (8.7 mi) southwest of the town, growing in size and intensity as it approached. The tornado reached F2 status as it inflicted severe damage to homes and to an industrial park in the southwest part of the town.

The tornado weakened and continued through more rural areas before striking the town of Markdale, where F0 damage occurred to homes and trees. The path of this tornado was 36 km (22 mi) long, making it the longest track tornado in Ontario since the Williamsford and Arthur tornadoes of 1996.

The next significant tornado to touch down occurred near the town of Thornbury along the shore of Georgian Bay. The tornado developed to the south of there, passing through Clarksburg and Blue Mountain, before moving out over the water. It was later rated at F2. As this cell moved out over Georgian Bay, more cells formed and intensified ahead of and within the main line as it moved eastward.

One supercell developed to the southwest of Barrie, and produced a family of four tornadoes as it tracked to the northeast for 125 kilometres (78 mi). The first touched down west of Barrie, staying on the ground for 12.6 km (7.8 mi). This tornado impacted rural areas between New Lowell and Edenvale. The second tornado touched down near Moonstone, while the third cut a 1 km (3,300 ft) wide, 10 km (6.2 mi) long path through the town of Gravenhurst, both of them rated F0. The final tornado of this family, an F1, touched down at Ril Lake. To the north of there, an F0 tornado affected Dollars Lake, to the northeast of Britt, while another F1 tornado hit at Arnstein near North Bay. To the east, F0 damage occurred from a tornado at Redstone Lake near Haliburton, where a woman was injured by flying glass and the roofs of cottages were damaged. Nearby in Haliburton County, another tornado inflicted F1 damage to trees at Haliburton Forest.

To the south, the most prolific tornadoes in the Greater Toronto Area in recent memory tore through sections to the north and east of Toronto. An isolated cell produced a tornado that swept across the Royal Riding Academy, in a rural area east of Newmarket. To this storm's west, another tornadic cell developed and ultimately produced the most damaging tornadoes in an urban area of Ontario since the Barrie tornado outbreak of 1985. Although originally thought to be a single tornado, two separate F2 tornadoes struck the city of Vaughan. The first hit the Woodbridge neighbourhood in the city's southwest, traveling for 3.5 km (2.2 mi). The second struck the Maple neighbourhood in the city's northeast, causing a 2.7 km (1.7 mi) path of damage. Both of these tornadoes have been rated F2.

Following the Vaughan tornadoes, the storms moved into sections of Central Ontario and Eastern Ontario. There, an F0 tornado struck near Orono, an F1 touched down in the Bancroft/Carlow/Mayo area, and a final confirmed F1 tornado struck at Rice Lake.

== Confirmed tornadoes ==
FU	F0	F1	F2	F3	F4	F5
0	4	11	4	0	0	0

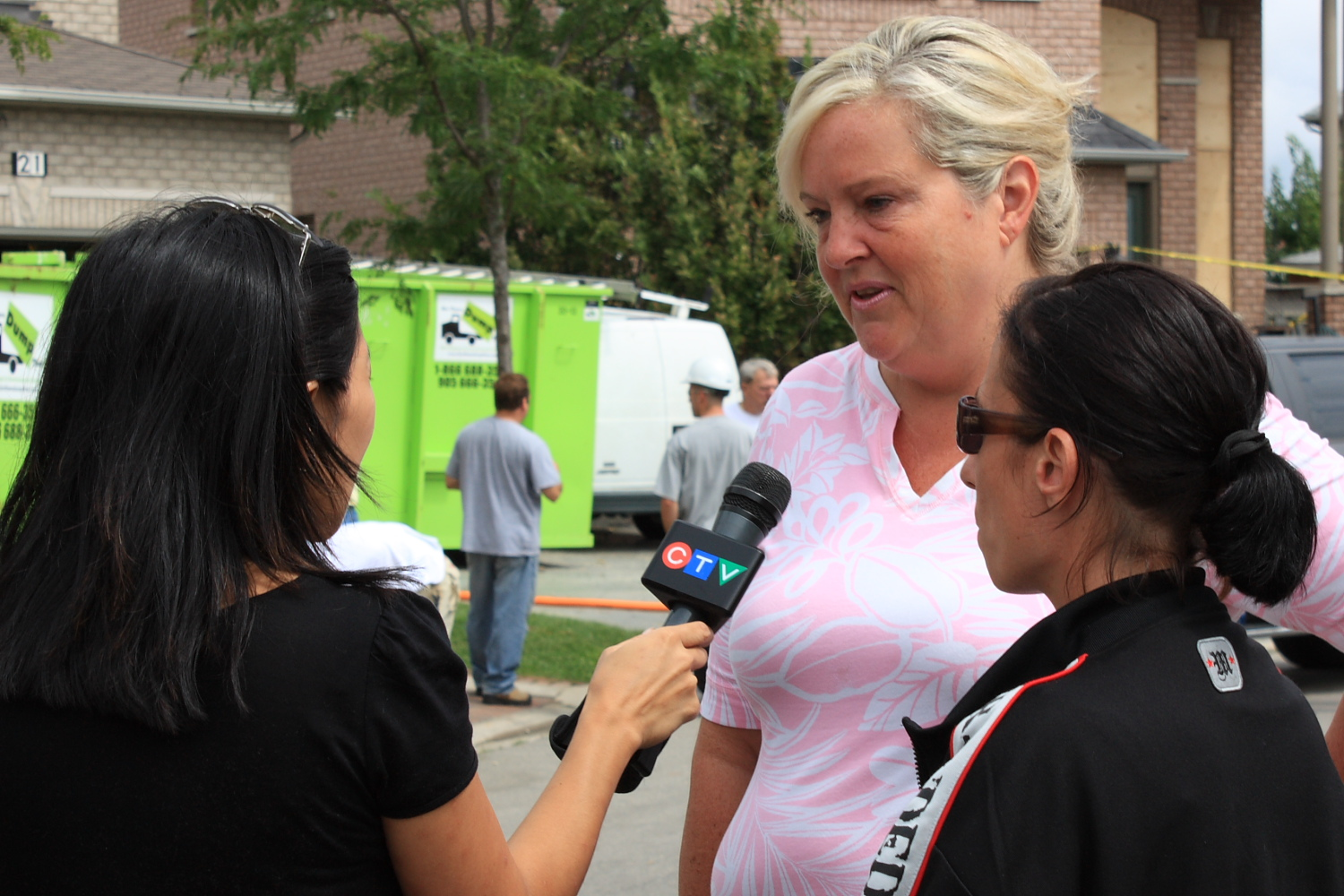
Vaughan Mayor Linda D. Jackson speaks to a CTV reporter about the tornadoes.

=== Durham, Ontario ===
Durham, Ontario
F2 tornado
- on the Fujita scale

Overall effects
- Casualties: 1 fatality, numerous injuries

The first tornado was at its most powerful as it passed through the southeast section of Durham, causing serious structural damage to several businesses in the town's small industrial park, including the complete destruction of a press plant. Damage to homes and businesses in this area was rated at F2. Passing through the northeastern part of town, the tornado hit a conservation area where a children's day camp was taking place. The tornado hurled debris from a gatehouse and other buildings and trees onto a tent structure where the children and counselors were seeking shelter. One 11-year-old boy was killed by flying debris, while several other children suffered serious, but non life-threatening injuries.

=== Thornbury–Clarksburg, Ontario ===
Thornbury-Clarksburg, Ontario
Meteorological history
- Formed: August 20, 2009
- Dissipated: August 20, 2009

F2 tornado
- on the Fujita scale
- Highest winds: 200 km/h (120 mph)

Overall effects
- Fatalities: 0
- Injuries: 0

This tornado inflicted F2 damage to homes and chalets in the popular ski resort area of Thornbury and Clarksburg. At Georgian Peaks, the tornado tore the roof from the Alpine Centre, pulled cables from chairlifts, and ripped apart lift houses and ski ramps. Although damage to homes and the resort was extensive, perhaps the greatest economic toll was to the owners of local apple orchards, which were severely affected. The tornadic storm responsible for the Grey County tornadoes weakened as it went over the bay, having traveled and sustained its intensity for, according to Environment Canada, "a remarkable 200km."

=== Barrie tornadoes ===
Barrie Tornadoes
Meteorological history
- Date: August 20, 2009

Tornado family
- Tornadoes: 4
- Max. rating: F1 tornado
- Highest winds: 117 km/h (73 mph) to 180 km/h (110 mph)

Overall effects
- Casualties: 0 fatalities, ≥0 injuries
- Areas affected: Barrie, Ontario
- Part of the tornado outbreaks of 2009

In the Barrie area, two farm homes were partially unroofed, a shed collapsed, and a heavy trailer was picked and moved a distance of over 100 m (330 ft). The second tornado caused F0 damage to cottages, homes and trees at Moonstone. The third produced F0 damage to trees and homes at Gravenhurst. The final tornado of this family caused F1 damage to trees and cottages at Ril Lake. To the north of there, the Dollars Lake F0 tornado caused tree damage.

=== Milton, Ontario ===
Milton, Ontario
Meteorological history
- Formed: August 20, 2009
- Dissipated: August 20, 2009
- Duration: ??? minutes

F1 tornado
- on the Fujita scale
- Highest winds: 117–180 km/h (73–112 mph)

Overall effects
- Fatalities: 0
- Injuries: 0

In Milton an F1 tornado damaged primarily a commercial medical building at the corner of Ontario and Wakefield streets, where it partially tore off the building's roof, as well as causing damage to cars, traffic lights, power lines, homes and trees in the surrounding neighbourhood. Affected streets in Old Milton included Bruce, Prince, Oak, Pine, Childs and Ontario (Ontario Highway 25).

=== Newmarket, Ontario ===
Newmarket, Ontario
Meteorological history
- Formed: August 20, 2009
- Dissipated: August 20, 2009
- Duration: ??? minutes

F1 tornado
- on the Fujita scale
- Highest winds: 117–180 km/h (73–112 mph)

Overall effects
- Fatalities: 0
- Injuries: >0

In Newmarket, a tornado damaged buildings and flipped over vehicles. Hundreds of people had been at the Royal Riding Academy attending a riding show, but saw the tornado well in advance and either left the facility or sought shelter before the tornado struck. Damage here was rated at F1, and casualties may have been higher had the tornado been stronger; many sought shelter in weak structures such as barns, sheds and horse trailers, including teenagers who were uninjured after the horse trailer they were in was tossed on its side.

=== Vaughan tornadoes ===
Vaughan Tornadoes
Meteorological history
- Date: August 20, 2009

Tornado family
- Tornadoes: 2
- Max. rating: F2 tornado
- Highest winds: 181 km/h (112 mph) to 253 km/h (157 mph)

Overall effects
- Casualties: 0 fatalities, ≥0 injuries
- Areas affected: Vaughan, Ontario
- Part of the tornado outbreaks of 2009

The first of the Vaughan tornadoes hit the Woodbridge neighbourhood in the southwest part of the city, flipping cars, damaging dozens of homes - many severely - as well as numerous businesses and a school. The second tornado struck the Maple neighbourhood in the northeast part of the city, causing a 2.7 km (1.7 mi) long path of damage to dozens of homes. Over 600 homes in the city were damaged by the tornadoes, with more than 40 of them being deemed uninhabitable immediately after the event; a handful of these homes ultimately had to be torn down and rebuilt. Although both of the tornadoes were rated F2, a researcher from the University of Western Ontario who studied the damage concluded that some of the destruction from one of the Vaughan tornadoes might have been indicative of a low-end F3 tornado.

=== Eastern Ontario tornadoes ===
Further east, a tornado, rated F0, inflicted minor damage to homes and trees near Orono. In the Bancroft/Carlow/Mayo area, the tornado produced F1 damage to trees and hunting cabins. The final confirmed tornado, an F1, caused roof and tree damage at Rice Lake.

== Aftermath ==
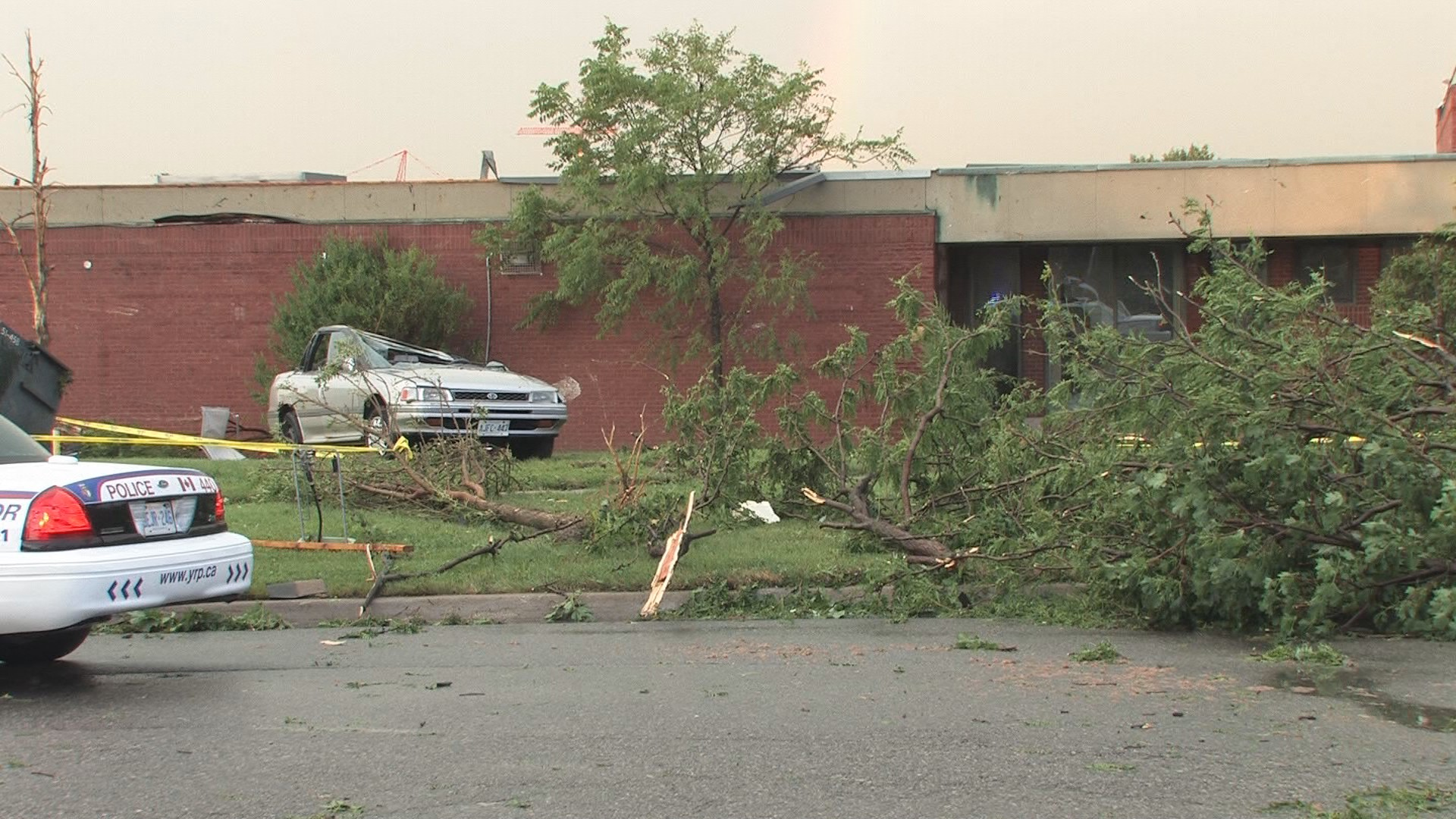
A crushed car rests on the lawn of a school in Woodbridge following the Vaughan tornadoes

In the hours after the tornadoes touched down, a state of emergency was declared in the city of Vaughan and in West Grey, including the region of Durham. In addition, two days after the tornado that affected the Blue Mountain area, a state of emergency was declared there.

Damage from the tornadoes in Grey County alone is conservatively estimated at over 30 million dollars. With damage at Vaughan estimated to be well over ten million dollars, the cost of this event surpasses that of the 1996 Southern Ontario tornadoes which caused insured losses of eight million dollars, and the Hamilton, Ontario tornado of 2005 which caused twenty five million dollars in damage at Lawfield Public School. As such, the outbreak is the costliest in Ontario since 1985 directly related to tornado damage.

Given their intensity and urban setting, particularly the tornadoes at Vaughan, the outbreak garnered media attention unlike any other in recent years. Cable news network CP24 set a viewing record with over 1.2 million people tuning in. The public interest in the tornadoes was mirrored by that of politicians; a review of the tornado warning process and changes to the dissemination of severe weather warnings in Canada will be made accordingly.

== See also ==
- Heat wave of 2006 derecho series, record-setting number of tornadoes, 17 confirmed, in one outbreak sequence that touched down in Southern Ontario, until the 2009 Southern Ontario tornado outbreak surpassed it with 18 tornadoes from the same system.
- Southern Ontario tornado outbreak of 2005, among the highest recorded storm-related insurance claims in Canada, mostly because of record rainfall in the Toronto area from a dying tornadic supercell.
- 1985 Barrie tornado outbreak, the deadly and violent tornado outbreak that occurred in Southern Ontario, 14 confirmed tornadoes in all with 12 fatalities.
