= South Summit Lake (Ontario) =

Lake

- Location within Ontario
- Location: Thunder Bay, Unorganized, Thunder Bay District, Ontario
- Coordinates: 50°37′24″N 88°12′46″W
- Primary inflows: Diverted water from Mojikit Lake (Ogoki Reservoir) on Ogoki River
- Primary outflows: to Stork Lake
- Basin countries: Canada
- Max. length: 3.0 km (1.9 mi)
- Max. width: 0.7 km (0.43 mi)
- Surface elevation: 324 m (1,063 ft)

South Summit Lake is a lake in Thunder Bay, Unorganized, Thunder Bay District, Ontario, Canada, about 40 kilometres (25 mi) north of Lake Nipigon and 60 kilometres (37 mi) northeast of the community of Armstrong.

== Hydrology ==
South Summit Lake is about 3 kilometres (1.9 mi) long and 0.7 kilometres (0.4 mi) wide, and lies at an elevation of 324 metres (1,063 ft). The primary inflow is over the Summit Control Dam from Mojikit Lake, water backed up into the lake from the Ogoki Reservoir on the Ogoki River, part of the Albany River system in the James Bay drainage basin. The diverted water flows into the north end of South Summit Lake, and out at the south end over the Stork Falls to Stork Lake. The water continues south through a series of lakes and the Little Jackfish River to Lake Nipigon, then via the Nipigon River into Lake Superior.
