= Nishin Lake =

Lake in Ontario, Canada

- Location within Ontario
- Location: Ontario
- Coordinates: 48.906°N 87.632°W
- Basin countries: Canada

Nishin Lake is a lake in Thunder Bay District, Ontario, Canada.

== See also ==
- Upper Nishin Lake
- List of lakes in Ontario
