= Pike Lake =

Pike Lake may refer to:

== Canada ==
- Pike Lake (Ontario), a lake in Lanark County
- Pike Lake (Saskatchewan), a lake in Saskatchewan
- Pike Lake Provincial Park, a park in Saskatchewan that includes about half of Pike Lake

== United States ==
- Pike Lake (Pope County, Minnesota), a lake
- Pike Lake, a lake in Scott County, Minnesota
- Pike Lake, a lake in St. Louis County, Minnesota, split across Grand Lake Township and Canosia Township
- Pike Lake State Park (Ohio)
- Pike Lake, Marathon County, Wisconsin, a community
- Pike Lake, Washington County, Wisconsin, a community
- Pike Lake Unit, Kettle Moraine State Forest, a lake and unit of the Wisconsin state park system
