= Steel River =

Steel River may refer to:

- Steel River (Ontario), a river in Thunder Bay District, Ontario, Canada
- Steel River (band), a Canadian rock band
- "Steel River", a song by Chris Rea from Shamrock Diaries, 1985
- River Tees, nicknamed Steel River, especially near Middlesbrough, UK

== See also ==
- Steel River Blues, a British television show
