= Sandy Lake (Ontario) =

Sandy Lake may refer to the following lakes in Ontario:

- Sandy Lake (Trent Lakes), a lake in the Trent Lakes township, Ontario, Canada
- Sandy Lake (Severn River), a widening of the Severn River, Ontario, Canada
