= Pierce Lake =

Pierce Lake or Lake Pierce may refer to:

- United States
  - Lake Pierce (Polk County, Florida)
  - Pierce Lake, a lake in Martin County, Minnesota
  - Pierce Lake, a lake in McLeod County, Minnesota
  - Pierce Lake, a man-made lake in Rock Cut State Park, Illinois
  - Pierce Lake (Montana), a lake in Missoula County, Montana
- Canada
  - Pierce Lake (Ontario)
  - Pierce Lake (Saskatchewan)
