= Caribou River (Thunder Bay District) =

- Location of the mouth of the Caribou River in Ontario

Location
- Country: Canada
- Province: Ontario
- Region: Northwestern Ontario
- District: Thunder Bay

Physical characteristics
- Source: Caribou Lake
  - coordinates: 50°31′04″N 89°10′21″W
  - elevation: 357 m (1,171 ft)
- Mouth: Smoothrock Lake
  - coordinates: 50°31′03″N 89°10′23″W
  - elevation: 351 m (1,152 ft)
- Length: 4.0 km (2.5 mi)

Basin features
- River system: James Bay drainage basin

The Caribou River is a river in the Unorganized Part of Thunder Bay District in Northwestern Ontario, Canada. The river is part of the James Bay drainage basin. It runs from Outlet Bay on Caribou Lake to Caribou Bay on Smoothrock Lake. Smoothrock Lake flows via several outlets including the Ogoki River directly, and then via the Ogoki River and the Albany River to James Bay.

== Tributaries ==
- Caribou Lake
  - Campbell Creek

== Sources ==
- Map 16 (PDF) (Map). 1 : 1,600,000. Official road map of Ontario. Ministry of Transportation of Ontario. 2014.
- Restructured municipalities - Ontario map #2 (Map). Restructuring Maps of Ontario. Ontario Ministry of Municipal Affairs and Housing. 2006. Archived from the original on 2014-04-10.
