= Frederic Thomas Nicholls =

Canadian politician

The Honourable Frederic Thomas Nicholls
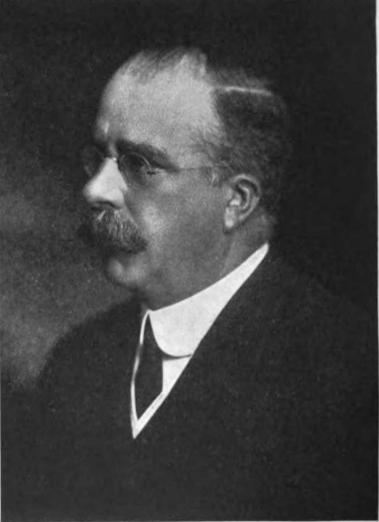

Canadian Senator from Ontario
- In office January 20, 1917 – October 25, 1921
- Appointed by: Robert Borden

Personal details
- Born: November 22, 1856 London, England
- Died: October 25, 1921 (aged 64) Toronto, Ontario, Canada
- Party: Conservative

Frederic Thomas Nicholls (November 22, 1856 – October 25, 1921) was a Canadian businessman, electrical engineer and politician. He was a Conservative senator representing the senatorial division of Toronto, Ontario from 1917 to 1921.

== Background ==
In 1892 Nicholls became second vice-president and general manager of Canadian General Electric. He was president of the National Electric Light Association of the United States in 1896–97 and brought its annual convention to Niagara Falls, Ontario, in 1897.

Frederic Nicholls was a member of Edison Pioneers and Ontario Hydro. He worked on the Toronto Power Company Plant with Dr. Frederick Stark Pearson of the Pearson Engineering Corporation of New York. The Toronto Power station was opened in 1906 by the Electrical Development Company of Ontario, led by Toronto billionaire financier Henry Pellatt, who owned the city's Casa Loma. Pellatt hired the same architect, Edward J. Lennox to design both his home and his hydroelectric generator in Niagara Falls.

Pellatt and partners William Mackenzie and Frederic Thomas Nicholls formed the Electrical Development Company of Ontario in 1903, buying water rights from the Niagara Parks Commission for $80,000 a year.

Nicholls was one of the directors along with William Mackenzie and Wilmot Deloui Matthews, to form the Canadian Shipbuilding Company with capital of $1 million in the early 1900s ($21,733,333 in 2018).

== Recognition and influence ==
The Nicholls Building on King Street in Toronto, Ontario, Canada is named after him including the Nicholls Oval and Nicholls Lake in Ontario. He was also known as an early editor of the Toronto Star newspaper. Frederic Nicholls's speech of January 19, 1905, to the Empire Club in Toronto was published as Niagara's power: past, present, prospective . . . ([Toronto, 1905], reproduced as CIHM, no.78710). A number of his other speeches are in his Conservation of Canadian trade (Toronto, 1918).
