= Whitesand River =

Whitesand River may refer to:

- Whitesand River (Hewitson River), Ontario, Canada
- Whitesand River (Lake Nipigon), Ontario, Canada
- Whitesand River (Saskatchewan), Saskatchewan, Canada
