= Third Lake =

Third Lake may refer to:

- Third Lake (Bisby Lakes, New York)
- Third Lake (Herkimer County, New York), part of the Fulton Chain of Lakes
- The Third Lake, Ontario, Canada
- Third Lake, Illinois, a village
- Third Lake, Nova Scotia, several lakes
- Third Lake, third of four lakes in the Nanaimo Lakes chain
