= Whiteclay Lake =

Lake in Ontario, Canada

- Location within Ontario
- Location: Ontario
- Coordinates: 50.885°N 88.750°W
- Basin countries: Canada

Whiteclay Lake is a lake in Thunder Bay District in northern Ontario, Canada.

== See also ==
- List of lakes in Ontario
