= Shutze Lake =

Schutze Lake
- Location of Schutze Lake in Ontario.
- Location: Ontario, Canada
- Coordinates: 52°05′15″N 94°11′58″W
- Type: Lake
- Max. length: 4.5 km (2.8 mi)
- Max. width: 3.9 km (2.4 mi)
- Surface elevation: 314 m (1,030 ft)

Schutze Lake is a lake in Kenora District in northwestern Ontario, Canada. It was named after Luther Schuetze, who carved his name on a tamarack tree without the c and e because there was not room for them.

The lake is about 4.5 kilometres (2.8 mi) long and 3.9 kilometres (2.4 mi) wide, lies at an elevation of 314 metres (1,030 ft), and is located about 6 kilometres (4 mi) east of the community of Poplar Hill / Poplar Hill First Nation. There are four unnamed creek inflows at the east, south and southwest. The primary outflow, at the west, is an unnamed creek to the Berens River, which flows into Lake Winnipeg. The lake is this part of the Hudson Bay and Nelson River drainage basins.

== See also ==
- List of lakes in Ontario
