= Thirty Island Lake =

Lake in Ontario, Canada

- Location within Ontario
- Location: Ontario
- Coordinates: 44°34′16″N 76°35′57″W
- Basin countries: Canada

Thirty Island Lake is a lake of southern Ontario, Canada, located northwest of Frontenac Provincial Park in Frontenac County.

== See also ==
- List of lakes in Ontario
