= Allanwater Bridge station =

Railway station in Ontario, Canada

Allanwater Bridge

General information
- Location: Allanwater Bridge, ON; Canada
- Coordinates: 50°14′25″N 90°10′03″W
- Owner: Via Rail

Construction
- Structure type: Sign post

History
- Former names: Canadian National Railway

Services
Preceding station	Via Rail	Following station
Flindt Landing toward Vancouver	The Canadian	Collins toward Toronto

Former services
Preceding station	Canadian National Railway	Following station
Allanwater toward Vancouver	Main Line	Kawa toward Montreal
Location

Allanwater Bridge railway station is located just north of Kawaweogama Lake in the Canadian province of Ontario, directly west of where the railway line crosses the river Allan Water over a truss bridge. This station is served by Via Rail. Transcontinental Canadian trains stop here under Via Rail's Special Stop Request program.

There is no permanent settlement at Allan Water; however, the station serves a number of recreational properties and wilderness lodges, and as an access point to Wabakimi Provincial Park. The area was also formerly home to the Allanwater (or Allan Water) trading post of the Hudson's Bay Company, that operated from 1918 to 1935, with a small Anglican church dedicated to St. Barnabas.
