= Silver Lake (Manitoulin Island) =

Lake on Manitoulin Island, Ontario, Canada

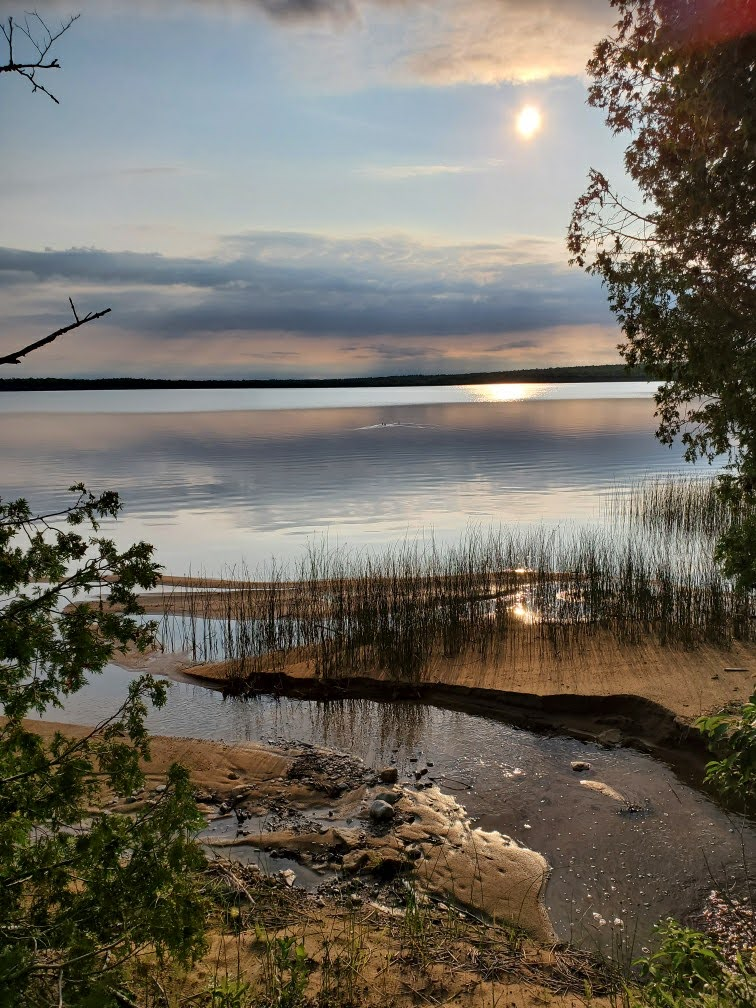
- A view of Silver Lake from the southern shore.

- Location in Ontario
- Location: Manitoulin Island, Lake Huron
- Coordinates: 45°52′39″N 82°53′29″W
- Type: lake
- Part of: Lake Huron drainage basin
- Primary inflows: spring-fed
- Basin countries: Canada
- Max. length: 4,050 m (13,290 ft)
- Max. width: 2,690 m (8,830 ft)
- Surface area: 525 hectares (1,297 acres)
- Average depth: 10 ft (3.0 m)
- Max. depth: 21 ft (6.4 m)
- Surface elevation: 205 metres (673 ft)
- Frozen: December–April
- Website: https://www.exploremanitoulin.com/silverwaterlake/

Silver Lake is a small lake on Manitoulin Island, in Lake Huron, Northern Ontario, Canada.

== See also ==
- Manitoulin Island
- List of lakes in Ontario
