= Otter Tail Lake (Ontario) =

Lake in Ontario, Canada

- Location within Ontario
- Location: Ontario
- Coordinates: 48.9539948°N 93.7112283°W
- Basin countries: Canada

Otter Tail Lake is a lake in Rainy River District, northwestern Ontario, Canada.

== See also ==
- List of lakes in Ontario
