= Windermere Lake (Ontario) =

Windermere Lake is the name of three significant lakes in Ontario, Canada.

- one in Sudbury District, at 47°57′03″N 83°46′02″W
- one in Nipissing District, at 46°02′46″N 78°40′06″W
- one in Kenora District, at 49°48′26″N 93°48′38″W

== See also ==
- List of lakes in Ontario
