= Umfreville Lake =

Lake in Ontario, Canada

- Location within Ontario
- Location: Ontario
- Coordinates: 50.2492°N 94.8115°W
- Basin countries: Canada

Umfreville Lake is a remote lake in Kenora District, Ontario, Canada.

== See also ==
- List of lakes in Ontario
