= Allan Water (Ontario) =

River in Canada

- Location of the mouth of the Allan Water in Ontario
- Etymology: Named after Allan Water in Scotland

Location
- Country: Canada
- Province: Ontario
- Region: Northwestern Ontario
- District: Thunder Bay
- Part: Thunder Bay, Unorganized

Physical characteristics
- Source: Kawaweogama Lake
  - location: Allanwater Bridge
  - coordinates: 50°14′30″N 90°09′50″W
  - elevation: 417 m (1,368 ft)
- Mouth: Wabakimi Lake
  - coordinates: 50°37′13″N 89°44′21″W
  - elevation: 357 m (1,171 ft)
- Length: 71 km (44 mi)

Basin features
- River system: James Bay drainage basin

Allan Water is a river in the James Bay drainage basin in Unorganized Thunder Bay District in northwestern Ontario, Canada.

== Course ==
The river begins at the community of Allanwater Bridge at the confluence of the two branches of the Brightsand River: the western branch arriving as the outlet from Kawaweogama Lake and the eastern branch arriving as the outlet from McEwan Lake. The Canadian National Railway transcontinental main line crosses over a bridge at the point of confluence, and is the location of Allanwater Bridge railway station, served by Via Rail transcontinental Canadian trains.

The river flows north and splits into two channels, then recombines, takes in the right tributary Nemo River and reaches Brennan Lake. The river leaves the lake east over Brennan Falls to Granite Lake, and then leaves that lake north over Granite Falls. It continues north over Black Beaver Rapids, Little Sturgeon Rapids and Sturgeon Rapids to reach its mouth at Wabakimi Lake on the Ogoki River. The Ogoki flows via the Albany River to James Bay.

With the exception of a short stretch at the start, the river lies within Wabakimi Provincial Park.

== Tributaries ==
- Nemo River (right)
- Labelle Creek (right)
- Foam Creek (left)

== See also ==
- List of rivers of Ontario
