= Mojikit Lake =

Lake in Ontario, Canada

- Location within Ontario
- Location: Ontario
- Coordinates: 50°40′20″N 88°16′03″W
- Basin countries: Canada

Mojikit Lake is a lake in northern Thunder Bay District, Ontario, Canada.

== See also ==
- List of lakes in Ontario
