= Blackett Lake (Ontario) =

Lake in Ontario, Canada

- Location within Ontario
- Location: Thunder Bay District, Ontario
- Coordinates: 50°27′50″N 88°45′16″W
- Primary outflows: Blackett Creek
- Basin countries: Canada
- Max. length: 1.7 km (1.1 mi)
- Max. width: 1.4 km (0.87 mi)
- Surface elevation: 325 m (1,066 ft)

Blackett Lake is a lake in Thunder Bay District, Ontario, Canada and the source of Blackett Creek. It is 1.7 kilometres (1.1 mi) long and 1.4 kilometres (0.9 mi) wide, and lies at an elevation of 325 metres (1,066 ft) about 26.5 kilometres (16.5 mi) northeast of the community of Armstrong.
