= Riley Lake (Kenora District, Ontario) =

- Location of Riley Lake in Ontario
- Location: Kenora, Ontario, Canada
- Coordinates: 49°36′43″N 94°09′28″W
- Type: Lake
- Part of: Hudson Bay drainage basin
- Max. length: 490 m (1,610 ft)
- Max. width: 220 m (720 ft)
- Surface elevation: 394 m (1,293 ft)

Riley Lake is a lake in geographic Code Township in the municipality of Sioux Narrows-Nestor Falls, Kenora District in Northwestern Ontario, Canada. It is part of the Hudson Bay drainage basin.

The primary inflow at the west is an unnamed creek. The primary outflow is an unnamed creek at the east that flows to Gibi Lake, which in turn flows via the Adams River, Lake of the Woods, the Winnipeg River, Lake Winnipeg and the Nelson River to Hudson Bay.

== See also ==
- List of lakes in Ontario
