= Big Sandy Lake (disambiguation) =

Big Sandy Lake may refer to:

- Big Sandy Lake in Aitkin County, Minnesota, United States
- Big Sandy Lake (Saskatchewan) in the Saskatchewan River drainage basin in Saskatchewan, Canada
- Big Sandy Lake along the course of the Geikie River in Saskatchewan, Canada

== See also ==
- Sandy Lake
