= Zionz Lake =

Lake in Ontario, Canada

- Location within Ontario Location within Canada
- Location: Ontario
- Coordinates: 51°24′33″N 91°51′49″W
- Basin countries: Canada

Zionz Lake is a remote lake in Kenora District in northwestern Ontario, Canada.

== See also ==
- List of lakes in Ontario
