= Triangle Lake (Ontario) =

Lake in Kenora District, Ontario, Canada

- Location within Ontario
- Location: northwestern Ontario
- Coordinates: 49.8367°N 93.5732°W
- Type: Glacial
- Primary inflows: One Unnamed Creek
- Primary outflows: none
- Basin countries: Canada
- Max. length: 600 m (2,000 ft)
- Max. width: 250 m (820 ft)
- Shore length^{1}: 2.531 km (1.573 mi)
- Frozen: Only in winter
- Islands: none
- Settlements: none
- ^{1} Shore length is not a well-defined measure.

Triangle Lake is a very small lake in northwestern Ontario, Canada. It is located between Dryden and Kenora, Ontario. It can be seen from the Trans-Canada Highway on the north side. In late June, 2009, it was the site of road construction. Triangle lake has recently been discovered to be acidified. It is a major concern.

== See also ==
- List of lakes in Ontario
