= Steel Lake (Ontario) =

Lake in Ontario, Canada

- Location within Ontario
- Location: Ontario, Canada
- Coordinates: 49°12′11″N 86°50′43″W
- Primary inflows: Steel River
- Primary outflows: Steel River
- Basin countries: Canada
- Max. length: 28 km (17 mi)
- Average depth: 16 m (52 ft)
- Max. depth: 64 m (210 ft)

Steel Lake is a very long, narrow lake in northwestern Ontario, Canada. It is located in Thunder Bay District, east of Nipigon and Red Rock, and west of Manitouwadge. It is part of the Steel River system, situated just downstream and north of the equally long and narrow Cairngorm Lake. The lake's outlet is in the extreme north end, at which point the Steel River turns 180 degrees and flows due south.

The lake and a 200 metres (660 ft) wide strip of land along its shores are protected within the Steel River Provincial Park.

== See also ==
- List of lakes in Ontario
