= Wahwashkesh Lake =

Lake in Ontario, Canada

- Location within Ontario
- Location: Whitestone, Parry Sound District, Ontario
- Coordinates: 45°43′02″N 80°02′23″W
- Primary inflows: Magnetawan River, Whitestone River
- Primary outflows: Magnetawan River
- Basin countries: Canada
- Surface area: 17.21 km^{2} (6.64 sq mi)
- Shore length^{1}: 106 km (66 mi)
- Surface elevation: 224 m (735 ft)
- ^{1} Shore length is not a well-defined measure.

Wahwashkesh Lake is a lake in Whitestone, Parry Sound District, Ontario, Canada, and is the largest lake in Parry Sound District, with a surface area of 1,721 hectares (4,253 acres) and over 106 km of shoreline. Approximately 30% of the shoreline property is Crown Land. The lake has two distinct basins: (1) the north basin or Top Lake is the smaller of the two, and (2) the south basin is the Big Lake. Wahwashkesh is part of the Magnetawan River system, and the lake is renowned for an extremely severe spring freshet with the lake levels often rising 3 to 4 meters above the concrete weir at the outlet of the river.

The lake has a diverse fishery with over 12 species of sport fish, including Northern Pike, Walleye, Smallmouth, and Largemouth Bass. In addition, Wahwashkesh is famous for its Atlantic Coastal Plain Flora. The lake ranks in the top five of all lakes in Ontario for such flora, which the Natural Heritage League and the World Wildlife Fund documented extensively in a 1989 study.

Wahwashkesh is from Ojibwa wâwâshkeshi 'deer'.

Established in 1954, the Lake Wah-Wash-Kesh Conservation Association is a not-for-profit association of cottagers and residents on Lake Wahwashkesh, Ontario, Canada. In May 2009, the Association in partnership with the Ministry of Natural Resources installed a new water level monitoring station in Bennett's Bay, to provide direct information on a continuous basis. The Lake Wahwahskesh monitoring station provides real time daily data on the lake's water level, water temperature, air temperature, and rainfall amount.

== See also ==
- List of lakes in Ontario
