= Rock Lake (Ontario) =

Lake in Ontario, Canada

- Location within Ontario
- Location: Ontario Near Kenora
- Coordinates: 49.7782°N 94.4141°W
- Basin countries: Canada
- Islands: 3 or 4 small islands
- Settlements: Close to Kenora

Rock Lake is a lake in Kenora District, Ontario, Canada. It has about 5 or so cabins on it, and it is located next to Little rock lake, or as the locals call it "the second lake".

== See also ==
- List of lakes in Ontario
