= Ulster Lake =

Lake in Kenora District, Ontario, Canada

- lac Ulster
- Location in Ontario
- Location: Kenora District, Ontario
- Coordinates: 49°34′48″N 93°59′43″W
- Part of: Hudson Bay drainage basin
- Primary inflows: Black River
- Primary outflows: Black River
- Basin countries: Canada
- Max. length: 3 km (1.9 mi)
- Max. width: 2 km (1.2 mi)
- Surface elevation: 372 m (1,220 ft)

Ulster Lake (French: lac Ulster) is a lake in the municipality of Sioux Narrows-Nestor Falls, Rainy River District in northwestern Ontario, Canada. It is part of the Hudson Bay drainage basin.

The primary inflow is the Black River at the east. The primary outflow is also the Black River which flows from the southern tip of the lake via the Lake of the Woods, the Winnipeg River and the Nelson River to Hudson Bay.

== See also ==
- List of lakes in Ontario
