= Onaman Lake =

Lake in Thunder Bay District, Ontario, Canada

- Location within Ontario
- Location: Ontario
- Coordinates: 50.000°N 87.444°W
- Basin countries: Canada

Onaman Lake is a lake in Thunder Bay District in northern Ontario, Canada.

This is from Ojibwa onâman 'vermillion, red clay'.

== See also ==
- List of lakes in Ontario
