= Shibogama Lake =

Lake in Ontario, Canada

- Location within Ontario
- Location: Ontario
- Coordinates: 53.573°N 88.189°W
- Basin countries: Canada

Shibogama Lake is a lake in northern Kenora District, Ontario, Canada.

== See also ==
- List of lakes in Ontario
