= Opinicon Lake =

Lake in Ontario, Canada

- Location in southern Ontario
- Location: Frontenac County and United Counties of Leeds and Grenville, Ontario
- Coordinates: 44°33′37″N 76°19′37″W
- Part of: Great Lakes Basin
- Primary inflows: Rideau Canal
- Basin countries: Canada
- Max. length: 7.5 kilometres (5 mi)
- Surface elevation: 119 metres (390 ft)
- Settlements: Chaffey's Lock, Opinicon Lake

Opinicon Lake is a lake in South Frontenac, Frontenac County and Rideau Lakes, United Counties of Leeds and Grenville in Eastern Ontario, Canada. This shallow lake was formed when Colonel John By built the Rideau Canal. It also is part of the Great Lakes Basin.

== Hydrology ==
The primary inflow is the Rideau Canal arriving, at the northwest, from Indian Lake over the control structures and lock at Chaffey's Lock, which gives its name to the tourist and cottage community located there. Secondary inflows are: Loughborough Lake Creek, at the east, which flows into Hart Lake and then into Opinicon Lake; and Rock Lake Creek, at the southeast, arriving from Lower Rock Lake. The primary outflow, at the northeast, is over the control structures and lock at Davis Lock to Sand Lake. The canal eventually flows via the Cataraqui River to Lake Ontario.

== Recreation ==
This lake is a popular fishing spot and location for cottagers. The Opinicon, a restaurant and former historical resort, is located at Chaffey's Locks. Skycroft Campground Resort is located at the west end of Opinicon Lake. Since 1958 Skycroft has been a sought after campground hosting visitors from all over the world wishing to explore the area.

== History ==
The Queen's University Biological Station, built in 1945, is on the lake. In 2010, the James H. Fullard Nature Reserve was created, situated on Sugarbush Island.

== Settlements ==
- Chaffey's Lock
- Lake Opinicon

== See also ==
- List of lakes in Ontario
