= Upper Nishin Lake =

Lake in Ontario, Canada

- Location within Ontario
- Location: Ontario
- Coordinates: 48.920°N 87.637°W
- Basin countries: Canada

Upper Nishin Lake is a lake located north of Lake Superior in Thunder Bay District, Ontario, Canada.

== See also ==
- Nishin Lake
- List of lakes in Ontario
