= Wapikopa Lake =

Lake in Ontario, Canada

- Location within Ontario
- Location: Ontario
- Coordinates: 52°55′22″N 88°05′37″W
- Basin countries: Canada

Wapikopa Lake is a lake in northern Kenora District, Ontario, Canada, located southwest of Winisk River Provincial Park.

== See also ==
- List of lakes in Ontario
