= Lake of Two Islands =

Lake in Ontario, Canada

- Location within Ontario
- Location: Haliburton County, Ontario
- Coordinates: 45.066°N 78.377°W
- Primary inflows: tributary of Drag River
- Basin countries: Canada
- Islands: 3 (Solo Island, Turtle Island and Scout Island)

The Lake of Two Islands is a lake in Dysart et al in Haliburton County, Ontario. This lake has three islands; Solo Island located on the north end next to Camp Timerlane, Turtle Island and Scout Island on the southside. This lake is used by Camp Timberlane and was shared with the former Camp Samac Adventure Base (established 1960s and relocated to Haliburton Scout Reserve after 2013).

== See also ==
- List of lakes in Ontario
