= Pokei Lake =

Lake in Ontario, Canada

- Location within Ontario
- Location: Algoma District, Ontario
- Coordinates: 48°25′37″N 85°14′06″W
- Primary inflows: Pokei Creek
- Primary outflows: White River
- Basin countries: Canada

Pokei Lake is a lake of Ontario, Canada. It is situated about 15 kilometres (9.3 mi) south of the town of White River.

A portion of the lake's northern shore is protected in the Pokei Lake/White River Wetlands Provincial Park.

== See also ==
- List of lakes in Ontario
