= Jojo Lake =

Lake in Ontario, Canada

- Location within Ontario
- Location: Thunder Bay District, Ontario
- Coordinates: 50°18′02″N 88°52′17″W
- Primary inflows: Whitesand River
- Primary outflows: Whitesand River
- Basin countries: Canada
- Max. length: 4.6 km (2.9 mi)
- Max. width: .4 km (0.25 mi)
- Surface elevation: 304 m (997 ft)

Jojo Lake is a lake in Thunder Bay District, Ontario, Canada. The primary inflow and outflow is the Whitesand River. The lake is about 4,600 metres (15,092 ft) long and 400 metres (1,312 ft) wide, and lies at an elevation of 304 metres (997 ft). The Canadian National Railway transcontinental line crosses the Whitesand River at the south end of the lake at a point just east of Armstrong Airport and about 11.5 kilometres (7.1 mi) east of the community of Armstrong, Thunder Bay District, Ontario.
