= Ogoki Lake =

Lake in Ontario, Canada

- Location within Ontario
- Location: Thunder Bay District, Ontario
- Coordinates: 50°50′01″N 87°10′18″W
- Primary inflows: Ogoki River
- Primary outflows: Ogoki River
- Basin countries: Canada

Ogoki Lake is a lake in Thunder Bay District, Ontario, Canada.

== See also ==
- List of lakes in Ontario
