= Wolfe Lake =

Lake in Ontario, Canada

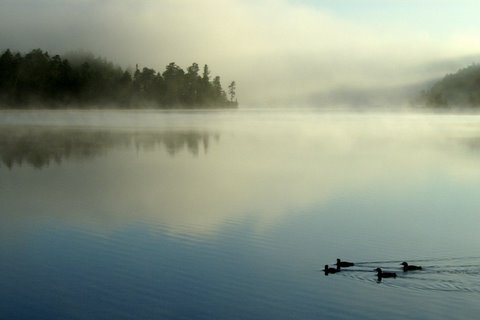
- Four loons swimming on Wolfe Lake

- Location within Ontario
- Location: Ontario
- Coordinates: 44.681°N 76.476°W
- Basin countries: Canada
- Settlements: South Frontenac and Rideau Lakes Townships

Wolfe Lake is a lake in Ontario, Canada, located in the eastern part of the province in South Frontenac and Rideau Lakes townships. The nearest village is Westport.

The shoreline surrounding Wolfe Lake is a mix of cottages, farmland and forest, with both gradual sloping shoreline and steeply pitched grades of rocky outcroppings. There are eight islands within the lake, including Derbyshire, Grape, Turnip, Woods, Horseshoe, Duck, Bateman, and Whitefish.

Some species of fish living in Wolfe Lake include both smallmouth and largemouth bass, walleye, northern pike, perch, rockbass, sunfish, bluegill, crappies and whitefish. Wildlife is diverse, including black bear, white-tailed deer, eastern coyote, fox, fishers, minks, weasels, raccoons, common loons, great blue herons, bald eagles, ospreys and kingfishers.

A local group, The Wolfe Lake (Westport) Association works to maintain the natural environment of Wolfe Lake, Green Lake and their shorelines.

There are also road associations that maintain the roads.

Camp IAWAH, a summer camp, is also located on Wolfe Lake.

== See also ==
- List of lakes in Ontario
