= Peters Lake (Parry Sound District) =

Lake in Parry Sound District, Ontario, Canada

- lac Peters
- Location of the lake in Southern Ontario
- Location: Parry Sound District, Ontario
- Coordinates: 45°32′37″N 79°08′47″W
- Part of: Lake Huron drainage basin
- Basin countries: Canada
- Surface area: 53.95 ha (133.3 acres)
- Surface elevation: 373 m (1,224 ft)

Peters Lake (French: lac Peters) is a lake in the municipality of Kearney, Parry Sound District in central Ontario, Canada. It is in the Lake Huron drainage basin.

Peters Lake has an area of 53.95 hectares (133.3 acres) and lies at an elevation of 373 metres (1,224 ft). The lake eventually drains via the Magnetawan River system to Georgian Bay on Lake Huron.
