= Spotter Lake =

Lake in Ontario, Canada

- Location of Spotter Lake in Ontario, Canada
- Location: Thunder Bay District, Ontario, Canada
- Coordinates: 48°40′46″N 85°44′08″W
- Type: Lake
- Max. length: 0.8 km (0.50 mi)
- Max. width: 0.6 km (0.37 mi)
- Surface area: 0.28 km^{2} (0.11 sq mi)
- Surface elevation: 423 m (1,388 ft)
- Max. temperature: 16 °C (61 °F)
- Min. temperature: −19 °C (−2 °F)

Spotter Lake is a lake located in the Thunder Bay region of Ontario, Canada. It is 800 km west of the capital, Ottawa. It covers 0.6 km from the north to the south and 0.8 km from the east to the west and had a total surface area of 0.28 km^{2}.

The surrounding area of the lake is mostly Mixed coniferous forest, and is mostly uninhabited. There are fewer than 2 inhabitants per square kilometre near the lake.
