= Steel River (Ontario) =

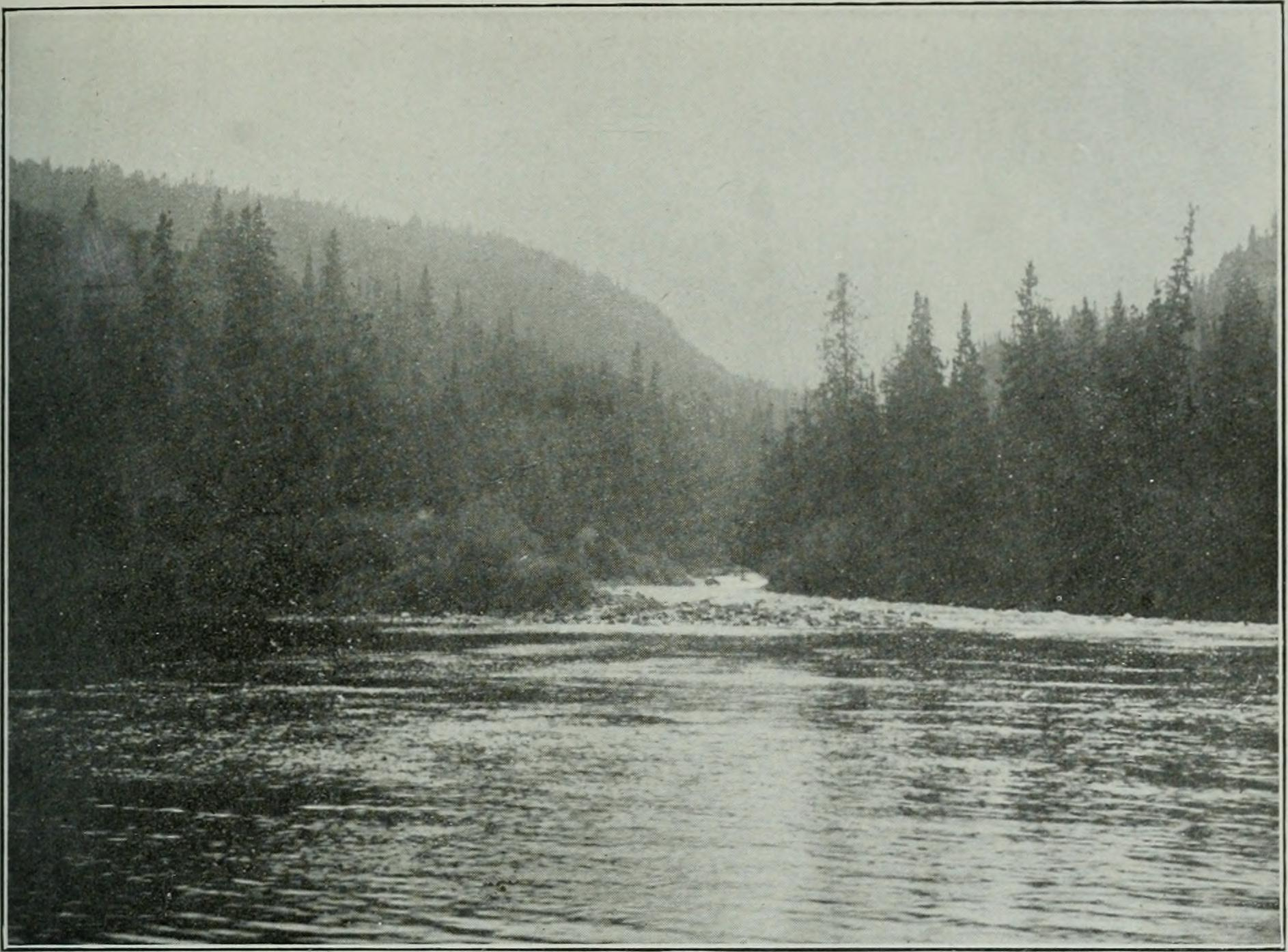
- Steel River, 1912

- Location of its mouth in Ontario

Location
- Country: Canada
- Province: Ontario
- District: Thunder Bay

Physical characteristics
- Source: Cairngorm Lake
  - location: Unorg. Thunder Bay
  - coordinates: 49°03′06″N 86°53′49″W
- Mouth: Santoy Bay (Lake Superior)
  - location: about 5 km (3.1 mi) east of Jackfish
  - coordinates: 48°46′17″N 86°53′42″W
  - elevation: 183 m (600 ft)

Basin features
- Tributaries
  - left: Little Steel River
- Waterbodies: Cairngorm, Steel, Punchard, Santoy

The Steel River (historically also spelled as Steele River) is a river in Thunder Bay District in northern Ontario, Canada. It empties into the north shore of Lake Superior east of Terrace Bay. Most of the river is protected in a provincial waterway park. It is a popular location for canoeing and fishing.

== Description ==
The river starts at the north end of Cairngorm Lake, flowing a short distance north to Steel Lake, which is a long narrow lake with its outlet also at the very northern end. From here the Steel River turns 180 degrees, flowing due south to Lake Superior. It is a free flowing river with steep canyons and rugged bedrock terrain.

The Steel River was likely used as a minor supply or fur-trading route in the 19th century. One indigenous burial site has been found along the river. It was first advertised as a canoeing destination in the 1890s by the Canadian Pacific Railway, that crosses the river near its mouth. The Steel River can be paddled as a circular loop via a 1 km-long (0.62 mi) portage (albeit with a strenuous 350 m (1,150 ft) climb) from Santoy Lake to Diablo Lake and on to Cairngorm Lake.

The Steel River is among a few north shore rivers that were never used for log drives.

== Steel River Provincial Park ==
Steel River Provincial Park
- IUCN category II (national park)
- Nearest town: Terrace Bay
- Coordinates: 49°19′47″N 86°42′53″W
- Area: 11,240 ha (43.4 sq mi)
- Designation: Waterway
- Established: 1989
- Governing body: Ontario Parks
- Website: www.ontarioparks.com/park/steelriver

The Steel River Provincial Park consists of a 200 metres (660 ft) wide corridor along each side of the Steel Lake and River system north of Santoy Lake, including Diablo Lake on the south. It also includes the Little Steel River up to Grehan Lake in the north. It was established in 1989 to protect the cultural and natural features of the river, while also providing backcountry recreational opportunities.

Significant features of the park include long narrow lakes, rugged cliffs, ravines, swamps, ponds, oxbow lakes, and a 20 metres (66 ft) waterfall.

Although it is a non-operating park, meaning that there are no facilities or services, the campsites and portages are maintained. Permitted activities include boating, camping, canoeing, fishing, and hunting.

== See also ==
- List of rivers of Ontario
