= Peters Lake (Frontenac County) =

Lake in Frontenac County, Ontario, Canada

- lac Peters
- Location of the lake in Southern Ontario
- Location: Frontenac County, Ontario
- Coordinates: 44°22′08″N 76°38′57″W
- Part of: Lake Ontario drainage basin
- Primary inflows: Millhaven Creek
- Primary outflows: Milhaven Creek
- Basin countries: Canada
- Surface area: 20.52 ha (50.7 acres)
- Surface elevation: 124 m (407 ft)

Peters Lake (French: lac Peters) is a lake in the municipality of South Frontenac, Frontenac County in eastern Ontario, Canada. It is in the Lake Ontario drainage basin.

Peters Lake has an area of 20.52 hectares (50.7 acres) and lies at an elevation of 124 metres (407 ft). The settlement of Murvale lies just south of the lake on Frontenac County Road 38. The primary inflow, at the north, and outflow, at the south, is Millhaven Creek, which flows to Lake Ontario.
