= Savant Lake (lake) =

Lake in Ontario, Canada

- Location within Ontario
- Location: Ontario
- Coordinates: 50.482°N 90.430°W

Savant Lake is a lake in the northwestern portion of Thunder Bay District, Ontario, Canada.

== See also ==
- List of lakes of Ontario
