= Sandy Lake (Louisiana) =

Lake in Catahoula Parish, Louisiana, United States

- Location within Louisiana Location within the United States
- Location: Catahoula Parish, Louisiana
- Coordinates: 31°41′29″N 091°53′53″W
- Basin countries: United States
- Surface elevation: 43 ft (13 m)

Sandy Lake is a lake in central Catahoula Parish, Louisiana, United States.
