= Sandy Lake (Alaska) =

Lake on the Alaska Peninsula

- Location within Alaska
- Interactive map of Sandy Lake
- Location: Alaska Peninsula
- Coordinates: 56°09′00″N 159°57′05″W
- Type: Lake
- Part of: Alaska Peninsula National Wildlife Refuge
- River sources: Upper Sandy River
- Primary outflows: Bering Sea
- Basin countries: United States
- Surface area: 122 acres (49 ha)
- Max. depth: 270 feet (82 m)
- Settlements: Port Moller, Alaska

Sandy Lake is a lake on the Alaska Peninsula. The lake is located between the Upper Sandy River and Lower Sandy River, which drains into the Bering Sea. It lies 25 miles north-east of Port Moller Airport and is on the boundary of the Alaska Peninsula National Wildlife Refuge. Mount Veniaminof lies to the west of the lake.

It is fed by Upper Sandy River which offers a spawning habitat for sockeye salmon as it enters the lake. Based on the surface area of the lake it has been estimated that the annual production of sockeye salmon is 119,000, however the model used for this estimate may not be appropriate for shallow lakes on the Alaskan peninsular such as Sandy Lake.

Steelhead trout have also been found in the lake.

The lake features a 10-foot terrace of lacustrine deposits.

The Sandy River weir is located approximately three miles downstream from Sandy Lake, at 56°07′ N latitude and 159°55′ W longitude. The structure spans roughly 200 feet in length and varies in depth from 2 to 5 feet.
