= Whitesand Lake (Lake Nipigon) =

Lake in Thunder Bay District, Ontario, Canada

- Location within Ontario
- Location: Thunder Bay District, Ontario
- Coordinates: 50°22′38″N 88°50′57″W
- Primary inflows: Whitesand River
- Primary outflows: Whitesand River
- Basin countries: Canada
- Max. length: 3.6 km (2.2 mi)
- Max. width: .5 km (0.31 mi)
- Surface elevation: 311 m (1,020 ft)

Whitesand Lake is a lake in Thunder Bay District, Ontario, Canada. The primary inflow and outflow is the Whitesand River. The lake is about 3,600 metres (11,811 ft) long and 500 metres (1,640 ft) wide and lies at an elevation of 311 metres (1,020 ft).

A second lake in Thunder Bay District with the same name, Whitesand Lake (Hewitson River), is further southeast and is on the Hewitson River system.
