= Selassie Lake =

Lake in Ontario, Canada

- Location within Ontario
- Location: Thunder Bay District, Ontario
- Coordinates: 50°26′52″N 88°44′09″W
- Primary outflows: Whitesand River
- Basin countries: Canada
- Max. length: 1.5 km (0.93 mi)
- Max. width: 0.25 km (0.16 mi)
- Surface elevation: 334 m (1,096 ft)

Selassie Lake is a lake in Thunder Bay District, Ontario, Canada, and the source of the Whitesand River which flows into Lake Nipigon. It is about 1,500 metres (4,921 ft) long and 250 metres (820 ft) wide and is at an elevation of 334 metres (1,096 ft). Selassie Lake is adjacent to Haile Lake, which also flows into Lake Nipigon, but via the Pikitigushi River system. The names of the two lakes are a reference to Haile Selassie I of Ethiopia.
