= Pike Lake (Ontario) =

Lake in Lanark County, Ontario, Canada

- Location within Ontario
- Location: Ontario
- Coordinates: 44.7833°N 76.3419°W
- Type: Freshwater
- Basin countries: Canada

Pike Lake is a lake of Lanark County in eastern Ontario, Canada. It is located southwest of the town of Perth, northwest of Big Rideau Lake, and due north of Upper Rideau Lake.

Pike Lake is significantly longer than it is wide, and it is easily accessible by road.

== See also ==
- List of lakes in Ontario
