= Lake Rosalind =

Lake in Ontario, Canada

- Location within Ontario
- Location: Bruce County, Ontario
- Coordinates: 44.1736°N 81.0501°W
- Basin countries: Canada
- Surface area: 38 ha (94 acres)

Lake Rosalind is a small inland lake located in Bruce County, Ontario, Canada between the towns of Hanover and Walkerton. Lake Rosalind and the interconnected Marl Lake to its south are manmade lakes that were created by the excavation of marl for local cement plants in the early 1900s and the construction of dams later in 1939 and 1946. Both lakes are relatively shallow and small in area (38 hectares and 14 hectares, respectively).

== Water flow ==
Marl Lake receives Lake Rosalind's overflow through a culvert, and there is also an interconnected "North Lake" to the north of Lake Rosalind. Almost the entire lakefront is developed, with mostly small properties that have been "urbanized" with hardened shorelines and manicured lawns. The high level of development resulted from the proximity of Hanover and Walkerton and excellent road system in the area.

The major source of water for the lake is from groundwater aquifers; there are no major streams or creeks that flow into the lake. There is minimal surface runoff from surrounding land, which is used for agricultural purposes. Lake Rosalind is considered a headwater lake and provides water for the Saugeen River. Little forest cover remains around the lake.

== 2006 algae infestation ==
In the fall of 2006, Lake Rosalind was infested with blue-green algae, which put a sudden halt to all water-related activities. Over the winter the algae died off, but residents are urged to not use lawn fertilizers and to keep their shoreline natural.
