= Pierce Lake (Ontario) =

Lake in Kenora District, Ontario, Canada

- Location within Ontario
- Location: Ontario
- Coordinates: 54.168°N 92.959°W
- Basin countries: Canada

Pierce Lake is a remote lake of Ontario, Canada. It is in the northwest of the province, near the Ontario-Manitoba border, in Kenora District. There are no roads leading to Pierce Lake, and it is a favourite for remote freshwater fishermen who access it by float plane.

== See also ==
- List of lakes in Ontario
