= Ril Lake (Ontario) =

Lake in Ontario, Canada

- Location within Ontario
- Location: Ontario
- Coordinates: 45.1638382°N 79.0084801°W
- Primary inflows: Springs
- Primary outflows: Rivers
- Basin countries: Canada
- Max. length: 2.74 km (1.70 mi)
- Max. width: max .60 km (0.37 mi)
- Average depth: 3.4 m (11 ft)
- Max. depth: 9.1 m (30 ft)
- Islands: 2

Ril Lake is a lake of Ontario, Canada. This lake is in the Township of Lake of Bays. Nearest Towns are Baysville, Ontario and Dorset, Ontario. It includes both year round and seasonal residents. Two main access roads, North and South Ril Lake Road. Both branch into smaller roads further in including but not limited to Watson Road, James Point Road, Ril Cove Road, McArthur Point Road and Muskoka Bob Road. There is a Ril Lake Road Association. It is forested with mixed deciduous and coniferous trees.

== See also ==
- List of lakes in Ontario
