= Blackett Creek =

River in Canada

- Location of the mouth of Blackett Creek in Ontario

Location
- Country: Canada
- Province: Ontario
- District: Thunder Bay

Physical characteristics
- Source: Blackett Lake
  - coordinates: 50°27′34″N 88°45′28″W
  - elevation: 325 m (1,066 ft)
- Mouth: Whitesand River
  - coordinates: 50°24′35″N 88°48′49″W
  - elevation: 313 m (1,027 ft)
- Length: 8.5 km (5.3 mi)

Blackett Creek is a river in Thunder Bay District, Ontario, Canada. It starts at Blackett Lake at an elevation of 325 metres (1,066 ft) and travels 8.5 kilometres (5.3 mi) to its mouth at the Whitesand River at an elevation of 313 metres (1,027 ft).

== See also ==
- List of rivers of Ontario
