= Wabakimi Provincial Park =

Provincial park in Ontario, Canada

- IUCN category Ib (wilderness area)
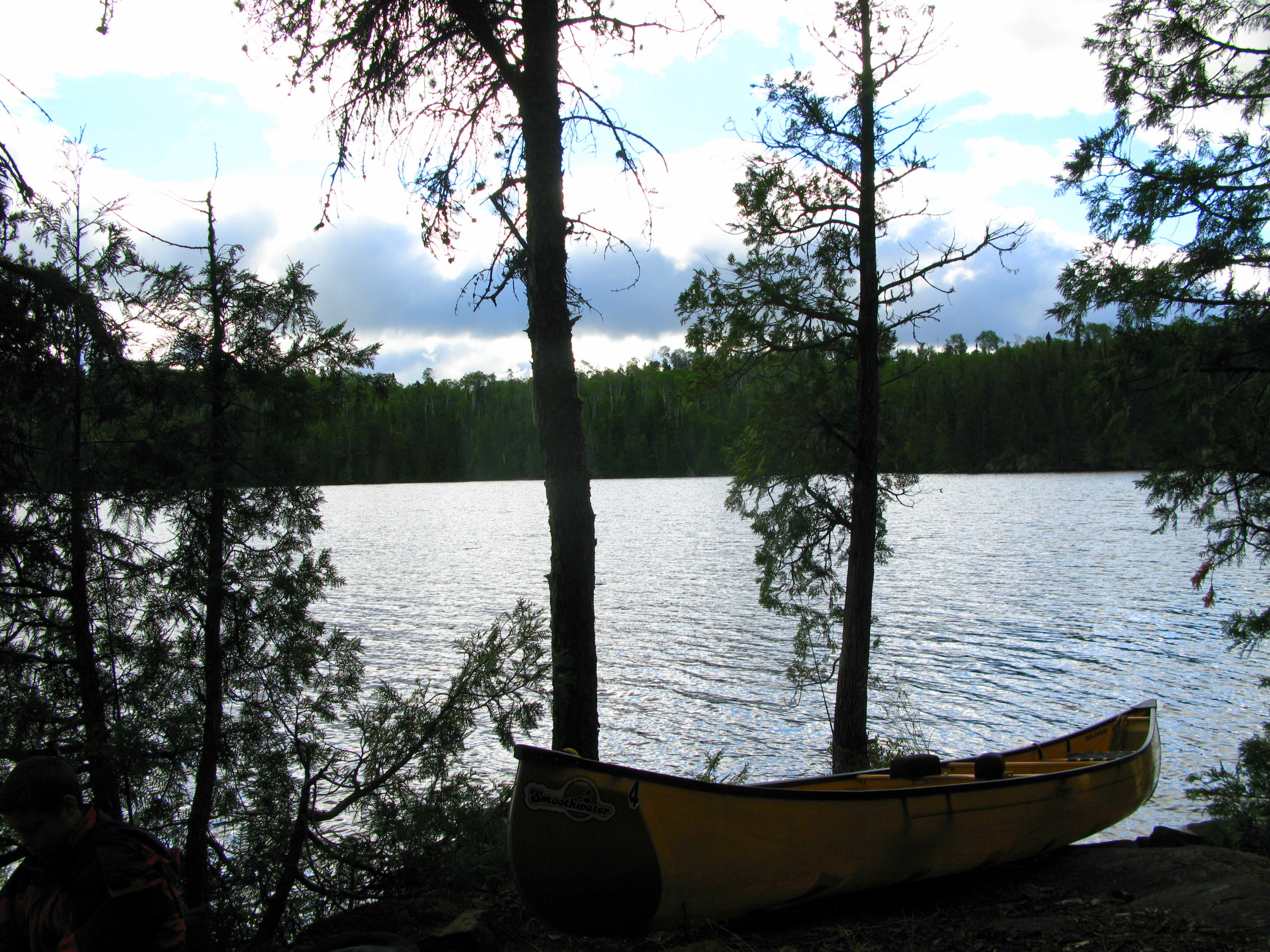

- Location within Ontario
- Interactive map of Wabakimi Provincial Park
- Location: Thunder Bay District, Ontario, Canada
- Nearest town: Armstrong, Ontario
- Coordinates: 50°37′18″N 89°37′09″W
- Area: 8,920.61 km^{2} (3,444.27 sq mi)
- Established: 1983
- Visitors: 3,004 (in 2022)
- Governing body: Ontario Parks
- Website: www.ontarioparks.com/park/wabakimi

Wabakimi Provincial Park is a wilderness park located to the northwest of Lake Nipigon and northwest of Armstrong Station in the province of Ontario, Canada. The park contains a vast and interconnected network of more than 2,000 kilometres of lakes and rivers. The park covers an area of 8,920 square kilometres (3,440 sq mi) and became the second largest park in Ontario (after Polar Bear Provincial Park) and one of the world's largest boreal forest reserves following a major expansion in 1997 (it was expanded almost sixfold that year). A number of local citizen groups and residents, including Bruce Hyer (former MP for Thunder Bay-Superior North) have been instrumental in the creation, expansion, and preservation of this region.

Armstrong Station has access points to this remote park by Caribou Lake Road, Little Caribou Lake, canoe, float plane, or rail. The main line of the Canadian National Railway skirts the south end of the park and Via Rail provides passenger service twice a week.

Paddlers (mostly canoeing) often travel the Allan Water, Flindt, Pikitigushi, and Ogoki River (along with a number of additional extended waterways) during the summer months. Wabakimi Provincial Park's waterways straddle a height-of-land from which water flows either to the Atlantic Ocean via Lake Superior or to the Arctic Ocean via the James Bay/Hudson Bay basins.

Several provincial waterway parks connect to Wabakimi:

- Ogoki River Provincial Park, to the east
- Albany River Provincial Park, to the north
- Kopka River Provincial Park, to the south
- Brightsand River Provincial Park, to the southwest

Many camps and outfitters use Wabakimi including Keewaydin Canoe Camp.

== Wabakimi Project and Friends of Wabakimi ==
The Wabakimi Project (2004-2018) was a not-for-profit effort to rediscover and explore the lost and/or abandoned canoe routes that lie within Wabakimi Provincial Park and on adjacent Crown lands. The Friends of Wabakimi is an Ontario non-profit that advocates for canoe routes and protection of the greater Wabakimi area.
