= The Third Lake =

Lake in Ontario, Canada

- Location within Ontario
- Location: Thunder Bay District, Ontario
- Coordinates: 48°55′53″N 87°24′53″W
- Primary outflows: Unnamed creek to Triangle Lake
- Basin countries: Canada
- Max. length: 0.8 km (0.50 mi)
- Max. width: 0.27 km (0.17 mi)
- Surface elevation: 395 m (1,296 ft)

The Third Lake is a lake in Thunder Bay District, Ontario, Canada. It is about 800 metres (2,625 ft) long and 270 metres (886 ft) wide, and lies at an elevation of 395 metres (1,296 ft) about 14.3 kilometres (8.9 mi) northwest of the community of Schreiber. It is part of the Pays Plat river system, which flows into Lake Superior, and the primary outflow is an unnamed creek to Triangle Lake.
