= Seseganaga Lake =

Lake in Ontario, Canada

- Location within Ontario
- Location: Ontario
- Coordinates: 50.090°N 90.354°W
- Basin countries: Canada

Seseganaga Lake is a lake in Thunder Bay District in northwestern Ontario, Canada.

== See also ==
- List of lakes in Ontario
