= Peters Lake (Sudbury District) =

Lake in Sudbury District, Ontario, Canada

- lac Peters
- Location of the lake in Ontario
- Location: Sudbury District, Ontario
- Coordinates: 47°54′09″N 83°49′26″W
- Part of: Lake Superior drainage basin
- Primary outflows: Unnamed creek to Windermere Lake
- Basin countries: Canada
- Surface area: 98.06 ha (242.3 acres)
- Surface elevation: 451 m (1,480 ft)

Peters Lake (French: lac Peters) is a lake in Peters Township, a geographic township, in the Unorganized North Part of Sudbury District in northeastern Ontario, Canada. It is in the Lake Superior drainage basin.

Peters Lake has an area of 98.06 hectares (242.3 acres), lies at an elevation of 451 metres (1,480 ft), and is within The Shoals Provincial Park. There are three inflows, all unnamed, at the south of the lake. The primary outflow, at the north, is an unnamed stream that leads north to Windermere Lake. Windermere Lake flows via the Windermere River, Shikwamkwa Lake, the Shikwamkwa River, Whitefish Lake, and the Michipicoten River to Lake Superior.
