= Sandy Lake (Trent Lakes) =

Lake in Peterborough County, Ontario, Canada (lat 44.55, lon -78.41)

- Location within Ontario
- Location: Ontario
- Coordinates: 44.544°N 78.406°W
- Primary inflows: spring-fed
- Primary outflows: creek flowing towards Buckhorn Lake
- Basin countries: Canada
- Max. length: 5 km (3.1 mi)
- Max. width: 1 km (0.62 mi)
- Surface elevation: 246 m (807 ft)

Sandy Lake is a lake in Trent Lakes township, Peterborough County, Ontario, Canada. It is about 5 km west of the community of Buckhorn, 1 km east of Lakehurst, and 25 km north of Peterborough. The lake is typically clear of turbidity and has a slight green color which results from the minerals present in the spring-fed water that feeds the lake. A small creek connects Sandy Lake to the Trent-Severn waterway at Buckhorn Lake. The majority of residences are seasonal.

== See also ==
- List of lakes in Ontario
