= Sandy Lake (Severn River) =

Lake in Ontario, Canada

- Location within Ontario
- Location: Kenora District, Ontario
- Coordinates: 53°1′N 93°2′W
- Basin countries: Canada
- Max. length: 90 km (56 mi)
- Surface area: 507 km^{2} (196 sq mi)
- Surface elevation: 275 m (902 ft)

Sandy Lake is a lake in Kenora District, Ontario. The Severn River flows through the lake. Sandy Lake First Nation community is located near the lake.

== See also ==
- List of lakes in Ontario
