= Whitesand River (Lake Nipigon) =

Location
- Country: Canada
- Province: Ontario
- Region: Northwestern Ontario
- District: Thunder Bay

Physical characteristics
- Source: Selassie Lake
  - coordinates: 50°26′42″N 88°44′47″W
  - elevation: 334 m (1,096 ft)
- Mouth: Lake Nipigon
  - coordinates: 50°10′10″N 88°49′16″W
  - elevation: 260 m (850 ft)
- Length: 37 km (23 mi)

Basin features
- River system: Lake Nipigon
- Tributaries
  - right: Blackett Creek

The Whitesand River is a river in Thunder Bay District, Ontario, Canada, that flows south into the northwest side of Lake Nipigon.

== Course ==
The river begins at Selassie Lake at an elevation of 334 metres (1,096 ft). Selassie Lake is adjacent to Haile Lake, which also flows into Lake Nipigon, but via the Pikitigushi River system. The names of the two lakes are a reference to Haile Selassie I of Ethiopia.

From Selassie Lake, the river flows southwest and then south to where the right tributary Blackett Creek joins at an elevation of 313 metres (1,027 ft). It continues south and enters Whitesand Lake at an elevation of 311 metres (1,020 ft). The river then continues further south for a total distance from Selassie Lake of 23 kilometres (14 mi) to JoJo Lake at an elevation of 304 metres (997 ft). Here the Canadian National Railway transcontinental line crosses the river at the south end of the lake at a point just east of Armstrong Airport and about 11.5 kilometres (7.1 mi) east of the community of Armstrong, Thunder Bay District, Ontario.

The river then travels 3.6 kilometres (2.2 mi) further south to a waterfall, and then another 10.4 kilometres (6.5 mi) southeast to its mouth at Lake Nipigon, for a total distance from Selassie Lake of 37 kilometres (23 mi).

== See also ==
- List of rivers of Ontario
