= Ogoki River =

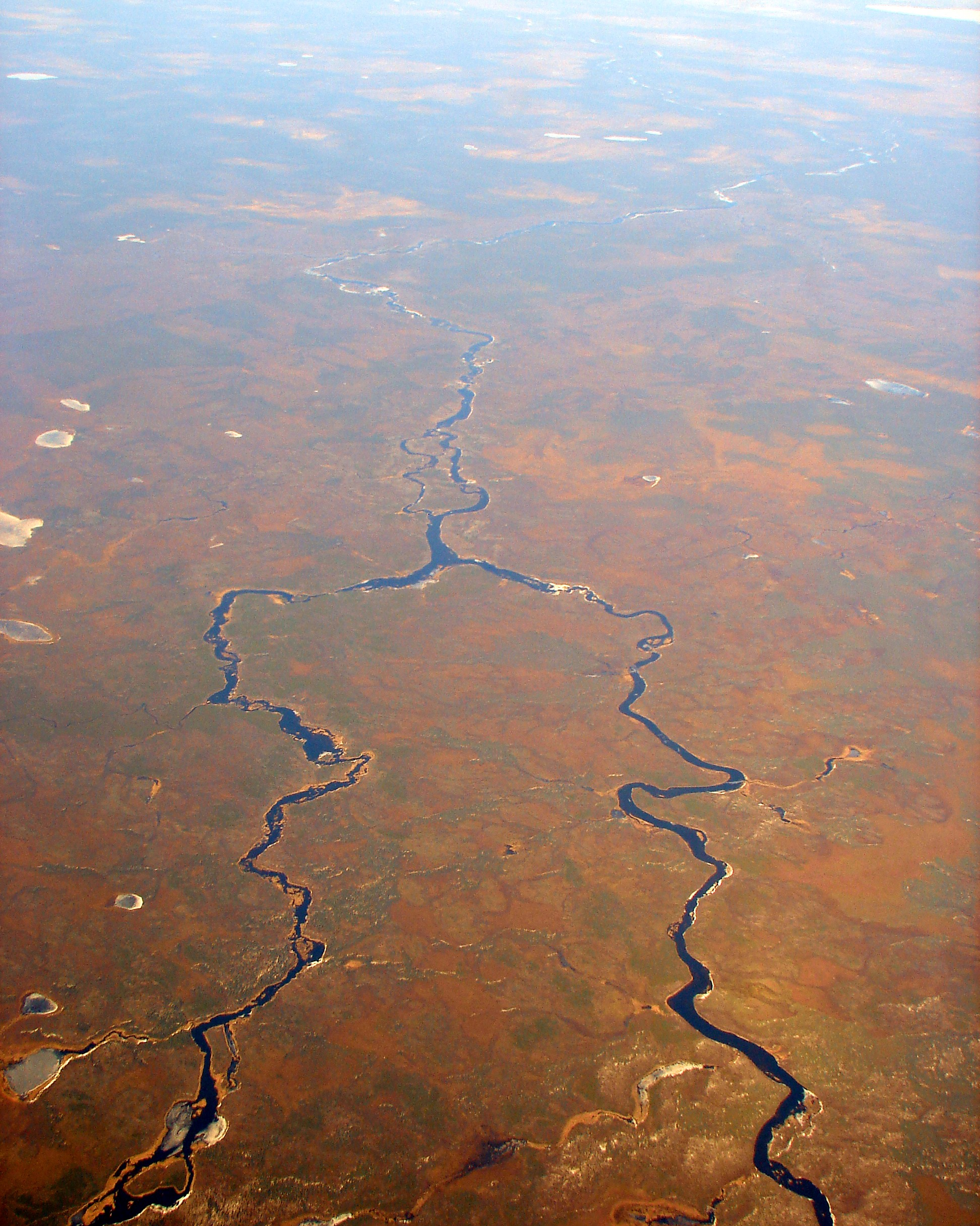
- Aerial view of Ogoki River

- Location within Ontario

Location
- Country: Canada
- Province: Ontario
- Districts: Thunder Bay, Cochrane

Physical characteristics
- Source: Endogoki Lake
  - location: Unorg. Thunder Bay
  - coordinates: 50°33′58″N 90°15′27″W
- Mouth: Albany River
  - location: Ogoki Post
  - coordinates: 51°37′28″N 85°57′02″W

Basin features
- Progression: Albany River→ James Bay
- Tributaries
  - left: Montcrief River, Dusey River
  - right: Rindt River, Allan Water, Raymond River, Ottertail River
- Waterbodies: Wabakimi Lake, Whitewater Lake, Whiteclay Lake, Ogoki Reservoir, Ogoki Lake
- Waterfalls: Waboose Falls

The Ogoki River is a river in the Thunder Bay and Cochrane Districts of Ontario. It springs from the wilderness just east of Savant Lake, flowing north of Lake Nipigon to Ogoki, where it joins the Albany River which empties into James Bay. The river is 480 kilometres (300 mi) long.

The Ogoki River is a narrow, deep, slow-moving, and anastomosing river, with high sediment content. Rapids occur where the river crosses bedrock shelves. The Speckled Trout Rapids, a particularly large set of rapids, is located between Harrogate and Patience Lake. An extensive delta and estuary system has developed where the river enters Ogoki Lake.

The river, now mostly used for canoeing and fishing, was part of a canoe route from Hudson Bay to Lake Superior: via James Bay, Albany River, Ogoki River, portage to Ombabika River, Lake Nipigon, Nipigon River, and finally Lake Superior.

Portions of the river are protected in the Wabakimi Provincial Park and Ogoki River Provincial Park.

== Fauna ==
The following fish species have been identified in Ogoki River system:

- walleye
- northern pike
- lake sturgeon
- yellow perch
- lake whitefish
- white sucker
- spottail shiner
- Iowa darter
- Johnny darter
- logperch
- redhorse sucker
- longnose dace
- sculpin
- ninespine stickleback
- burbot
- lake chub
- mimic shiner
- trout-perch
- fathead minnow
- speckled (brook) trout

== Diversion ==
In 1943, the Hydro-Electric Power Commission of Ontario diverted a large part of the upper Ogoki to flow into Lake Nipigon and on to the Great Lakes. This diversion was intended to increase water flow for the Sir Adam Beck Hydroelectric Generating Stations at Niagara Falls, downstream of Lake Erie.

14,360 square kilometres (5,545 mi^{2}) of the Ogoki basin is diverted by a 15 metres (50 ft) high and 520 metres (1,700 ft) long dam at the Waboose Falls (also known as Waboose Rapids), constructed in 1940-43. Together with another 3 control dams, this dam raises the water level by about 12 metres (40 ft), thereby creating Ogoki Reservoir (which is 70 kilometres (43 mi) long and covers an area of approximately 150 square kilometres (58 mi^{2})). An average of about 4,000 cubic feet per second (110 m^{3}/s) is diverted to the headwaters of the Little Jackfish River, a tributary of Lake Nipigon, and leaving about 1,000 cubic feet per second (28 m^{3}/s) to flow down the Ogoki River itself.

This diversion increases the size of Lake Nipigon's watershed by almost 60%, and together with the Long Lake diversion of the Kenogami River, raises Lake Superior by an average of 2.1 centimetres (0.83 in). Although the water levels have improved in the Great Lakes, it has also caused a major drop in water levels and unnatural flooding in the Ogoki River.

== Ogoki River Provincial Park ==
Ogoki River Provincial Park
- IUCN category II (national park)
- Interactive map of Ogoki River Provincial Park
- Coordinates: 50°49′36″N 87°13′56″W
- Length: 140 km (87 mi)
- Area: 23,250 ha (89.8 sq mi)
- Designation: Waterway
- Established: 2004
- Governing body: Ontario Parks
- Website: www.ontarioparks.com/park/ogokiriver

The Ogoki River Provincial Park protects a 140 kilometres (87 mi) long section of Ogoki River, from Ogoki Reservoir to the Thunder Bay-Cochrane boundary. It also includes Ogoki Lake in its entirety, as well as Kayedon, Harrogate, and Patience Lakes. It was established in 2004 and serves as an important recreational waterway, offering remote tourism and recreation opportunities such as angling, hunting, wildlife viewing, and backcountry canoe camping.

Significant features of the park include a diversity of upland and wetland vegetation, as well as a number of glacial features. It also has a number of plant species that are of regional significance, such as the sandbar willow, along the riverbanks, and the ovate spikerush, found on an Ogoki Lake beach.

It is a non-operating park, meaning that there are no facilities or services. Permitted activities include boating, canoeing, fishing, and hunting.

== See also ==
- List of Ontario rivers
