= Bullmoose =

Canadian rock band

- Origin: Elgin, Ontario, Canada
- Genres: Rock music
- Years active: 1996-2008
- Members: Jeff Cowan; Seamus Cowan; Eric Lawrance

Bullmoose was a Canadian rock band formed in Elgin, Ontario in 1996. Its members were twin brothers Jeff Cowan (drums/vocals) and Seamus Cowan (bass/vocals) from Westport, Ontario, and Eric Lawrance (guitar/vocals) from Delta, Ontario, who launched the band when they attended school in Montreal. The band performed in the rock music genre, citing experimental influences of the late 1960s and early 1970s.

Bullmoose's independently released their 2004 album, Lessons Learned, which was recorded at Studio Piccolo in Montreal. It was engineered and co-produced by Bullmoose and Ryan Patterson (The Exchanges/Kill The Lights) with Mathieu Roberge, and mastered by Ryan Morey at SNB. The band toured throughout Canada in 2005 for the Night Danger Tour in support of the record.

Bullmoose performed at Canadian music festivals including Canadian Music Week, North By Northeast, Festival of the Islands, Ottawa Bluesfest, Festival International Maximum Blues, and Vancouver's Feb Fest. They played such venues as Toronto's Horseshoe Tavern, Montreal's Club Soda and The Brickyard in Vancouver. They also received substantial airplay on Kingston's KRock 105.7 with the single Poor Man's Hash. In the same year, the band also appeared on Made in Canada with Tootall on Montreal's CHOM-FM 97.7, and Underground Sounds on McGill University's CKUT-FM 90.3.

In 2007, Bullmoose released the album Speaker to Speaker. Created at Breakglass Studio in Montreal under producer Jonathan Cummins (Bionic/The Doughboys), the album was engineered by Jace Lasek (The Besnard Lakes/Land of Talk/Wolf Parade), mastered by Ryan Morey (Arcade Fire/Malajube/The Stills) and designed by Todd Stewart at Breeree. The band became inactive after the album's release.

== Discography ==
- Lessons Learned (2004), Independent
- Speaker to Speaker (2007), Independent
