= Charles Broley =

American raptor biologist

Charles Lavelle Broley (December 7, 1879 – May 4, 1959) conducted pioneering bird banding work with Bald Eagles, and was one of the first researchers to recognize and publicize the deleterious environmental effects of DDT. After retiring as a bank manager in Winnipeg, Manitoba at age 58, in 1938 Broley began spending the winter with his wife and daughter in Tampa, Florida, and banded 1,240 nestling eagles through 1959. Banding returns of those birds revealed that Bald Eagles hatched in Florida immediately wandered as far north as Canada, movements that were previously unsuspected. Nesting failures of Florida Bald Eagles beginning in the mid-1940s led to Broley being one of the first to correctly suspect that DDT was the responsible agent.

== Early years and banking career ==
Broley was born in 1879 in Gorrie, Ontario to a "strict Methodist minister," who soon moved the family to nearby Elora. Broley trained as a telegraph operator at age 15, but in 1899 secured a job in the Merchants Bank of Canada's new Elora branch. Broley was promoted to manager at the Delta, Ontario branch in 1905. In 1908 he married Ruby E. Stevens. Ruby contracted tuberculosis, and despite Broley moving to a position as manager at Merchants Bank's Corydon Avenue branch in Winnipeg, Manitoba in 1918 in the belief that she would benefit from the drier climate, she died in 1921. In 1923 Broley married Myrtle Jeanne McCarthy (1898–1958), who would later write the book Eagle Man about Broley's exploits. Their daughter, Jeanne, was born in 1928 (d. 2021). Broley managed the Merchants Bank branch in Winnipeg (staying on after its merger with the Bank of Montreal in 1923) until he retired in 1938 at age 58.

After moving to Winnipeg, Broley became interested enough in birds to contribute to A.G. Lawrence's weekly "Chickadee Notes" column in the Winnipeg Free Press newspaper. He also became associated with the Natural History Society of Manitoba, serving at various times 1924–34 as secretary and later chairman of the ornithological section, and as vice president of the society.

== Eagle banding in Florida ==
After retirement and a trip to Europe, the Broleys moved to an apartment at 609 Swann Avenue in Tampa, Florida, and spent their summers at a cabin on Whiskey Island in Lower Beverley Lake in Delta. On the way to their first winter in Florida they attended the 1938 American Ornithologists' Union's annual meeting in Washington, D.C. There Broley met Richard Pough, who suggested he hire some boys to band Bald Eagles in Florida, providing Broley with four bands. In Florida, Broley initially hired local boys to climb to the nests, as Pough had advised, but they were unreliable, so he started climbing to the nests himself. Broley built his own ladders, made of rope with wooden rungs. His main one was 45 feet long; longer climbs necessitated tying on additional, shorter ladders. (He must have had great confidence in his knot-tying skills.) Broley was remarkably athletic and spry, particularly for his age, and chin-ups were part of his exercise regimen: when he could do 16 consecutively he knew he was in tree-climbing shape. From 1938 to 1959, Broley climbed over 1,100 trees to band 1,240 eagle nestlings on Florida's west coast from Inverness to Fort Myers (straight-line distance 160 miles). Myrtle climbed to a nest only one time, a solo effort to a low nest that was nonetheless harrowing for both her and her husband, who watched anxiously from the ground, but Jeanne climbed to nests "several times."

Newspaper and magazine accounts of Broley's work often referred to it as his "hobby," but it was anything but a pleasant pastime. The nests to which Broley climbed were sometimes as high as 125 feet. In addition to the effort and danger involved in climbing, his arms and hands were always covered in scratches, cuts, and punctures inflicted by the nestlings. His description of one nest hidden in a cypress swamp included that it could "be seen from a hill half a mile away, but once I enter the swamp, I have been unable to find the nest because of deep water, tangled undergrowth, and the abundance of cottonmouth snakes." An Atlantic article from 1957 listed other obstacles: "Some of the trees [Broley] ascends are half eaten through by fire. Others are so old they go down in the next storm. Several times in the back country Broley has been mistaken for a revenue officer, and on one occasion he nearly lost his automobile in a grass fire set to drive him off. When he began banding he was arrested as a suspicious character three times in one month. One day on the Gulf coast, among dry palmettos, he stepped back to look up at a nest and trod squarely on a coiled diamondback [rattlesnake], his heel, providentially, pinning its head to the ground." He was once startled by a (non-venomous) Eastern Coachwhip Snake that suddenly hissed a foot from his head while he was high in a tree at the base of an eagle nest. Broley sometimes wore "high 'snake' boots" when doing fieldwork, but his wife didn't think he wore them often enough.

Bald Eagles bring odd items to their nests, and by 1947 Broley's list of such items included light bulbs, "Clorox bottle, snap clothes pin, rubber shoe, child's dress, gunny sack, sugar bag, ear of corn, many shells, white rubber ball (which an eagle was 'incubating' six weeks after its young had hatched), a fishing plug, and a 70-foot fish line with hook attached (the last-named object perhaps brought to the nest with fish)." He later added "a family photograph in a heavy frame, wax candles, [epiphytes], magazines, and pieces of bright-colored cloth" to the list. Broley gave hundreds of talks over the years to bird clubs, civic groups, etc., partly to fund his eagle work; in addition to color movies of his eagles, he sometimes regaled his audiences with a show-and-tell of some of the unusual items found in their nests.

Broley banded much lesser numbers of Bald Eagles in the vicinity of his Delta, Ontario summer home; those efforts were more casual and his area of field work much more restricted. By 1947 he had banded 29 eaglets in Ontario.

== Results of Florida eagle banding work ==
There were 90 band returns for the first 1,000 nestlings Broley banded; almost all were from dead, usually shot, birds. His banding led to a major revision in the understanding of eagle dispersal and migration: Florida Bald Eagles were considered non-migratory until Broley's pioneering work quickly proved otherwise. He banded his first nestlings in January, 1939, and one banded on the 28th was found dead in Columbiaville, New York, on May 8, over 1,100 miles away. Some Broley-banded Florida nestlings were later found as far away as Canada; one was found dead on Prince Edward Island on June 1, 1941, 1,600 miles north of where it was banded on February 8, and the greatest traveler was one found shot 200 miles north of Winnipeg, ~2,000 miles from its banding site.

In a 1947 Wilson Bulletin article, Broley stated that there were no recoveries of his eagle bands in Florida in the months of June to October, and no recoveries north of the state in January to March. All the nestlings he banded apparently headed north shortly after fledging, then returned to Florida for the winter. Broley suspected eagles in the older age classes followed the same migration pattern, because other observers he knew in the area told him they often saw migratory assemblages of eagles in spring and fall, but few eagles in the summer. Broley cited a spike in the numbers of Bald Eagles counted heading south past Hawk Mountain Sanctuary, Pennsylvania in September, and believed these represented Florida birds returning south. Today it is recognized that many eagles, especially subadults and non-breeding adults, do migrate north out of Florida for the summer, and that many of the ones seen at hawk watch sites like Hawk Mountain in August and September are birds heading back to the southern states for the winter.

== DDT ==
Broley had his best year in 1946, when he banded 150 nestlings at 105 nests. The 1947 season, however, marked the start of a long, continuous trend of decreasing nesting success; beginning in that year, a table in the Eagle Man appendix records dozens of instances of unhatched eggs, abandoned nest sites, and adults present but not breeding. At first Broley suspected the Florida heat was the culprit; in 1952 Myrtle proposed hot winters, fall hurricanes, and an increasing human population as possible reasons, but concluded, "There are many problems in nature that are still unsolved and this is one of them." In a few years, however, Broley realized that the use of DDT in Florida beginning in 1945 was the cause, and he was among the first to alert the public to its environmental toxicity. He testified to that effect in the Florida legislature in 1957; after finding only three eaglets in the 1958 field season, he stated in a letter to Audubon Magazine that DDT had made the adult eagles sterile. (DDT assimilation actually causes the females to produce eggs with shells too thin to be able to hatch.) Rachel Carson quoted Broley's declining eagle numbers in Silent Spring, her 1962 landmark book about the dangers of DDT.

== Death ==
Shortly after returning to Delta in the spring of 1959, Broley died of a heart attack, age 79, fighting a brush fire that started when he was burning litter by his Whiskey Lake cabin. His cabin still stands on Whiskey Island.
