= Review Mirror =

The Review-Mirror is a local weekly community newspaper based in Westport, Ontario, Canada. The newspaper also serves North Leeds, Rideau Valley and Rideau Lakes, and was established in 1893.

The Review-Mirror is a local news source, dedicated to serving the Westport and Rideau Lakes community. It provides comprehensive coverage of local events, news and issues that matter to the local community. Their mission is to strengthen the community by supporting local businesses, promoting local initiatives, and fostering a sense of belonging.

== History ==
The Westport Mirror was established in 1893 by Harry E. Bywater, an experienced newspaper man from Southern Ontario. After four years of ownership, Bywater sold the paper to William B. Adams. Bywater continued his career in journalism, eventually acquiring the Athens Reporter. He died in Athens in 1924.

Adams, whose family still has ties to the area, died in 1916 while swimming in the Upper Rideau.

The Niblock family, Arthur and Cassie, took ownership following Adams' death. Their son, James R. (Jimmy) Niblock, continued the legacy until his passing in 1966, followed but the death of his mother, Cassie Niblock, who died in 1969. Jimmy Niblock’s death caused a disruption in the publishing schedule that lasted for nearly a year, causing almost all issues before 1967 to disappear.

On January 24, 1967, Frederick and Phyllis Hutchinson breathed new life into the Mirror, guiding it for nearly two decades.

The Runciman family, with Leeds Grenville MPP Bob Runciman and his father Sandy Runciman, took the helm in May 1986. Sandy, a veteran journalist from the Brockville Record & Times, oversaw operations until Bob took over following his time in politics. Soon after, Bob Runciman’s political career took a turn in the right direction, leading him to sell the paper in August 1987 to Phil Rutherford and Bob Loucks.

Howie Crichton acquired the Mirror in November 1993. Later, the free-distribution paper, The Review, was bought out and incorporated into the publication.

In 2022, John Fenik purchased the Review-Mirror from Crichton following his time as Mayor of Perth for sixteen years. With a strong interest in writing, filmmaking, and photography, John wished to make a significant contribution to the community of Westport through the Review-Mirror.

As of January 1, 2025, Sarah Gillingwater has become the new owner of the Review-Mirror.
