= Jones Falls (disambiguation) =

Jones Falls may refer to:

- Jones Falls, a river in Maryland, United States
- Jones Falls, Ontario, a hamlet in Rideau Lakes, Ontario, Canada
- Jones Falls Dam, a dam on the Rideau Canal in Rideau Lakes, Ontario
- Jones Falls Expressway, an expressway in Maryland carrying Interstate 83
- Jones Falls (Queensland), a waterfall in Queensland, Australia
