= Foley Mountain Conservation Area =

Conservation area in Ontario, Canada

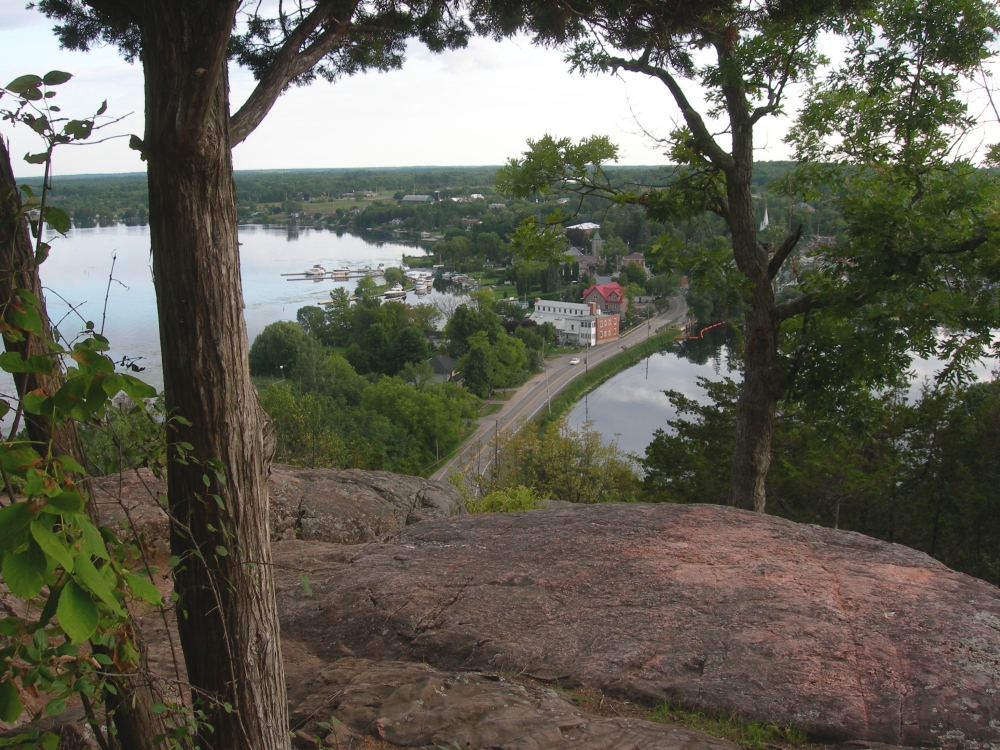
- Foley Mountain overlooking Westport, Ontario

- Location within Ontario
- Location: Township of Rideau Lakes, Ontario, Canada
- Nearest city: Kingston
- Coordinates: 44.6877°N 76.3852°W
- Area: 325 hectares (800 acres)
- Website: rvca.ca/careas/foley/index.html

Foley Mountain Conservation Area, the highest conservation area in the Rideau Valley, overlooks Upper Rideau Lake and Westport. It features a variety of wildlife in 325 hectares (800 acres) of woods, ponds and fields.

The area also has a sandy beach with changing facilities. The 300 km Rideau Trail, linking Kingston and Ottawa, passes through the conservation area.

Foley Mountain Conservation Area is operated by the Rideau Valley Conservation Authority.
