= Sand Lake (Ontario) =

There are a number of Sand Lakes in Ontario:

- Sand Lake (Patterson Township, Ontario) - Parry Sound District
- Sand Lake (Swartman Township, Ontario) - Cochrane District
- Sand Lake (Olrig Township, Ontario) - Nipissing District
- Sand Lake (Chelsea Township, Ontario) - Algoma District
- Sand Lake (Muskoka District, Ontario)
- Sand Lake (Leeds and Grenville United Counties, Ontario), described in 1828 by surveyor John Burrows (who called it "Davies Lake")
- Sand Lake (South Frontenac, Ontario) - Frontenac County
- Sand Lake (North Frontenac, Ontario) - Frontenac County
- Sand Lake (Kearney, Ontario) -Parry Sound District
- Sand Lake (Manitouwadge, Ontario) - Thunder Bay District
- Sand Lake (Laurentian Hills, Ontario) - Renfrew County
- Sand Lake (Cockburn Island, Ontario) - Manitoulin District
- Sand Lake (Head, Clara and Maria, Ontario) - Renfrew Count
- Sand Lake (Stoney Township, Ontario) - Algoma District
- Sand Lake (Paudash Township, Ontario) - Sudbury District
- Sand Lake (Foleyet Township, Ontario) - Sudbury District
- Sand Lake (Echum Township, Ontario) - Algoma District
- Sand Lake (Val Rita-Harty, Ontario) - Cochrane District
- Sand Lake (West Nipissing, Ontario) - Nipissing District
- Sand Lake (Strey Township, Ontario) - Thunder Bay District
- Sand Lake (Central Manitoulin, Ontario) - Manitoulin District
- Sand Lake (Minaki, Ontario) - Kenora District
- Sand Lake (Northern Algoma, Ontario) - Algoma District
