= Upper Rideau Lake =

Lake in Ontario, Canada

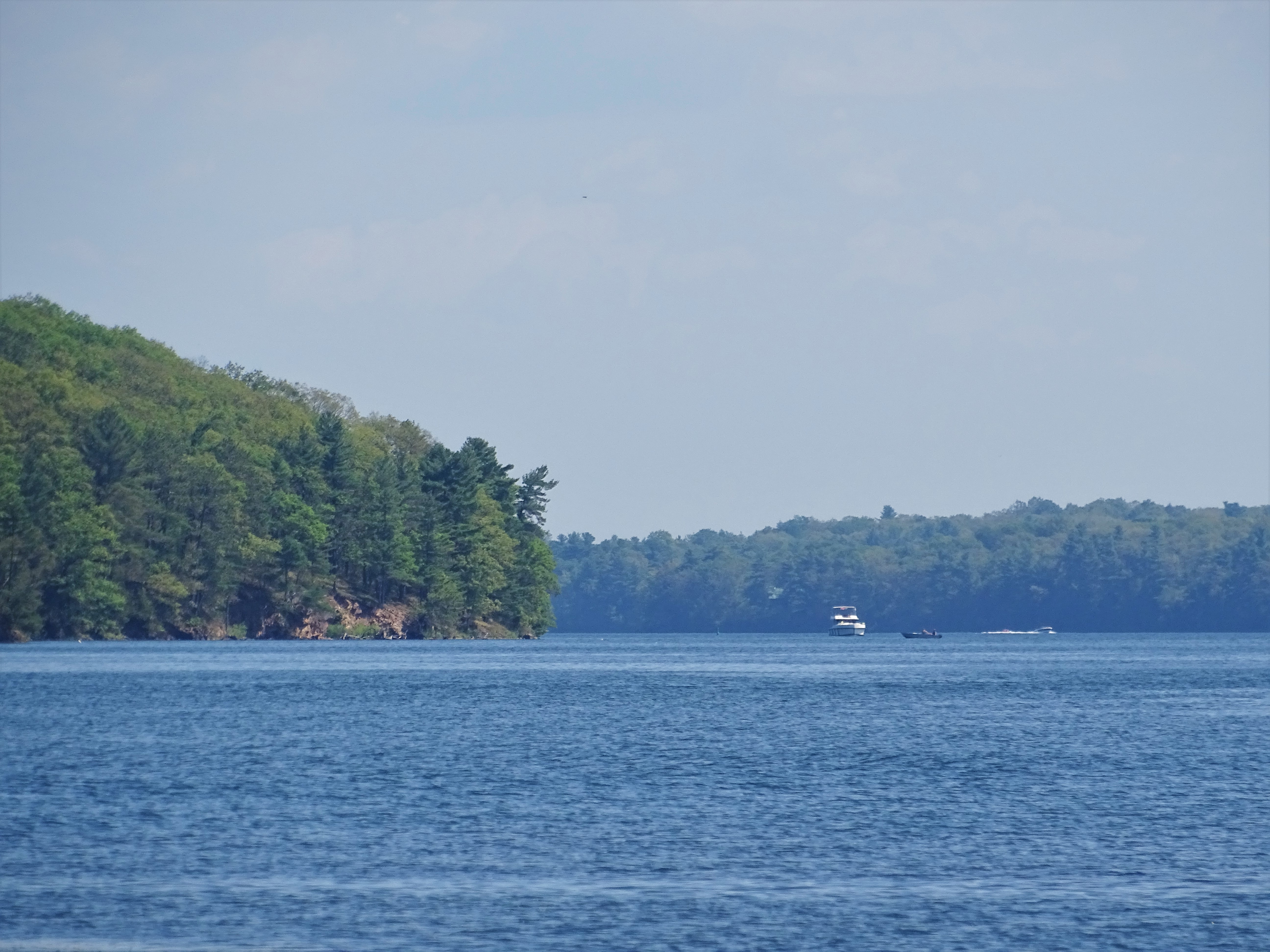
- Upper Rideau Lake seen from Westport Harbour

- Location within Ontario
- Location: Ontario
- Coordinates: 44.682°N 76.336°W
- Primary inflows: Westport Sand Lake
- Primary outflows: Big Rideau Lake
- Catchment area: 61 km^{2} (24 sq mi)
- Basin countries: Canada
- Max. depth: 23 m (75 ft)
- Surface elevation: 124.65 m (409.0 ft)
- Settlements: Village of Westport, Village of Newboro

Upper Rideau Lake is a freshwater lake located in the municipality of Rideau Lakes, United Counties of Leeds and Grenville in Eastern Ontario, Canada. A part of the Saint Lawrence River drainage basin, the lake has the highest altitude of any body of water within the Rideau Canal system.

== Geography ==
Upper Rideau Lake is bordered by the village of Westport to the west and Newboro to the south.

=== Hydrology ===
Upper Rideau Lake is the summit of the Rideau Canal system, with a surface elevation of 124 meters (408 ft) above sea level. Despite having the highest elevation, Upper Rideau Lake is not at the top of the watershed. Water flows north to the Rideau River but does not flow south to the Cataraqui River.

Inflow comes from Westport Sand Lake, part of the Rideau Lake Subwatershed, while outflow winds through the Narrows Lock and into Big Rideau Lake, which eventually flows to the Saint Lawrence River via the Ottawa River.

=== Geology ===
The Rideau Lake Fault is a normal fault which exposes granite that can be observed on much of Upper Rideau Lake's northern shore. The northern half of Upper Rideau Lake is located in the Algonquin Highlands. The bedrock in the Precambrian landscape consists mostly of gneiss and marble and is covered in a very thin layer of mixed glacial sediment. The southern half of Upper Rideau Lake is located between the Algonquin Highlands and the Smiths Falls Limestone Plain. The bedrock here consists of Paleozoic quartzose sandstone, dolomite, and conglomerate covered in a variety of sediments: glacial till, silt, clay, organic deposits, and sand.

== History ==
Before the creation of the Rideau Canal (1826–1832), the Upper, Big, and Lower Rideau Lakes were a single body of water. It was originally intended to remain one lake when an attempt was made to excavate the naturally rocky shallows on the Upper Narrows. When this proved to be difficult and resource-consuming, Lt. Colonel John By finalized plans to build a dam and a Narrows Lock, separating the waters and forming Upper Rideau Lake. The creation of Narrows Lock raised the water in the area by approximately 2.5 meters (8 ft), resulting in flooding. Drowned shorelines resulted in a number of newly created marshes and many snags.

== Slack Water System ==
The Water levels of the Rideau Canal system are monitored by the Ministry of Natural Resources and Forestry and Parks Canada. Water levels are managed for recreation, allowing for drafts during the navigation season and for residents with docks, boathouses, and shorefronts. In late May, water levels are at their maximum, gradually declining throughout the summer, reaching the lowest point in October and then to the winter operating level. During this cycle, the range of water height is approximately 1 meter (3 ft).

== Recreation ==
Upper Rideau Lake has large populations of bass and other fish, making it a popular spot for recreational fishermen. Boats and small ships frequent the lake due to its location. Many hiking trails nearby link up to separately-managed golf courses and campgrounds, and higher altitudes nearby are home to ski routes that melt into the lake and nearby bodies of water in early spring. In 2015, the lake's Newboro Lock Station recorded 5,355 vessel passages, while Narrows Lock Station reported 6,208.

The Foley Mountain Conservation Area, located on the banks of the lake near Westport, is a small park containing 5.5 miles (9 km) of hiking trails. Educational programs are available on-site for tourists, and focus on the lake's history and biology.

== Regulations ==
=== Fishing Regulations ===
Upper Rideau Lake is situated within Fisheries Management Zone 18. Licenses, open seasons, and catch limits are governed by the Ontario Fishing Regulations.

=== Canal Regulations ===
The Rideau Canal Lock stations operate from mid-May through mid-October each year. Lockage and mooring fees are charged based on vessel length (per foot).

== Fauna ==
=== Fish ===
Upper Rideau Lake is home to a variety of bass. The newly flooded surroundings resulting from the canal's creation allowed bass populations to thrive. In addition to the abundance of largemouth and smallmouth bass, species of fish in Upper Rideau Lake include sunfish, bluegill, rock bass, black crappie, yellow perch, northern pike, walleye, and lake trout. Ministry of Natural Resources fisheries specialists have reported that the aquatic habitat is stable for warm-water fish. As the lake's pH conditions are within range for a healthy environment. Fishery quotas have remained unstable, with the exception of the yellow perch quota, which was last increased in 2013.

=== Birds, reptiles, amphibians & mammals ===
Upper Rideau Lake is home to a variety of wildlife species. Commonly observed birds include the common loon, great blue heron, green heron, osprey, turkey vulture, pileated woodpecker, Canada goose, mallard duck, common merganser, hooded merganser, ring-billed gull, and trumpeter swan. Commonly observed reptiles and amphibians include the map turtle, painted turtle, snapping turtle, northern leopard frog, American bullfrog, garter snake, northern water snake, and eastern ratsnake. The most commonly observed mammals include squirrels, chipmunks, coyotes, foxes, porcupines, skunks, beavers, otters, muskrats, mink, raccoons, and white-tailed deer.

=== Endangered Species ===
Upper Rideau Lake is home to a range of endangered and at-risk species. Endangered species include the loggerhead shrike and spotted turtle. Threatened species include the golden-winged warbler, least bittern, peregrine falcon, chimney swift, red-headed woodpecker, grey fox, Blanding's turtle, musk turtle, and black rat snake. Special concern species include the cerulean warbler, Louisiana waterthrush, short-eared owl, yellow rail, red-shouldered hawk, southern flying squirrel, five-lined skink, map turtle, snapping turtle, Eastern milk snake, and ribbon snake.

== Water Quality ==
The Rideau Valley Conservation Authority rated the water quality of Upper Rideau Lake as poor in its 2014 Watershed Report (data collected from 2005 to 2014). Contributing factors to these ratings include elevated nutrient concentrations, periods of reduced oxygen availability, clear water, and occasionally elevated pH levels. High nutrient concentrations are part of the natural aging process of a lake. In this case, aging may be accelerated due to a high runoff of nutrients from residential shoreline areas, as well as areas of drowned land resulting from the construction of the Rideau Canal. High nutrient concentrations have enabled the excessive growth of aquatic plants and algae blooms.

=== Westport Sewage Discharge ===
In April 2014, The Village of Westport dumped 24 million liters (63 million gallons) of untreated sewage into Upper Rideau Lake following a roughly 3-year-long collapse of their sewage treatment system. With a sewage lagoon ready to burst, millions of liters were shipped away for treatment, while two emergency discharges of over 12 million liters (31 million gallons) went directly into the lake, fueling blue-green algae growth. Before 1996, the Village of Westport had no treatment plan in place and would dump untreated sewage twice annually into the lake. In 2018, the Village of Westport completed a Large Subsurface Disposal System (LSSDS) costing roughly $3,000,000 to treat the sewage. As of March 2019, there have been no discharges for the past 12 months.

=== Blue-Green algae concerns ===
In August 2014, toxins were confirmed to be present in blue-green algae blooms. Leeds, Grenville & Lanark District Health Unit issued a public health notice warning not to drink the lake water or allow pets or livestock to do so. This outbreak can be attributed to the sewage dump, erosion, high spring runoff, and changes in the zebra mussel population among other causes.

== Sustainability ==
Plans for the management, protection, and sustainability of the Rideau Canal, including Upper Rideau Lake, are:

- Rideau Canal National Historic Site of Canada Management Plan (2005)
- Rideau Canal World Heritage Site Management Plan (2005)

Organizations that serve to ensure the long-term wellness of the lake are:

- Upper Rideau Lake Association (founded 1989). This non-profit organization focuses primarily on water quality and improving the lake environment.
- Friends of the Rideau (founded 2009). A non-profit organization working to promote the enjoyment of the Rideau Canal and to preserve its natural culture and heritage.

=== Solar Farm ===
North Burgess Solar Project, owned by Northland Power, is located North of Upper Rideau Lake on Highway 14. This green energy facility is a 10 MW ground-mounted photovoltaic solar project operating 40,000-50,000 solar panels and 30 DC to AC inverters. It is estimated to power approximately 2,000 Ontario homes.

== See also ==
- List of lakes in Ontario
