= Perth Road =

Community in Ontario, Canada

Coordinates: 44.467°N 76.491°W

Location of Perth Road in Ontario

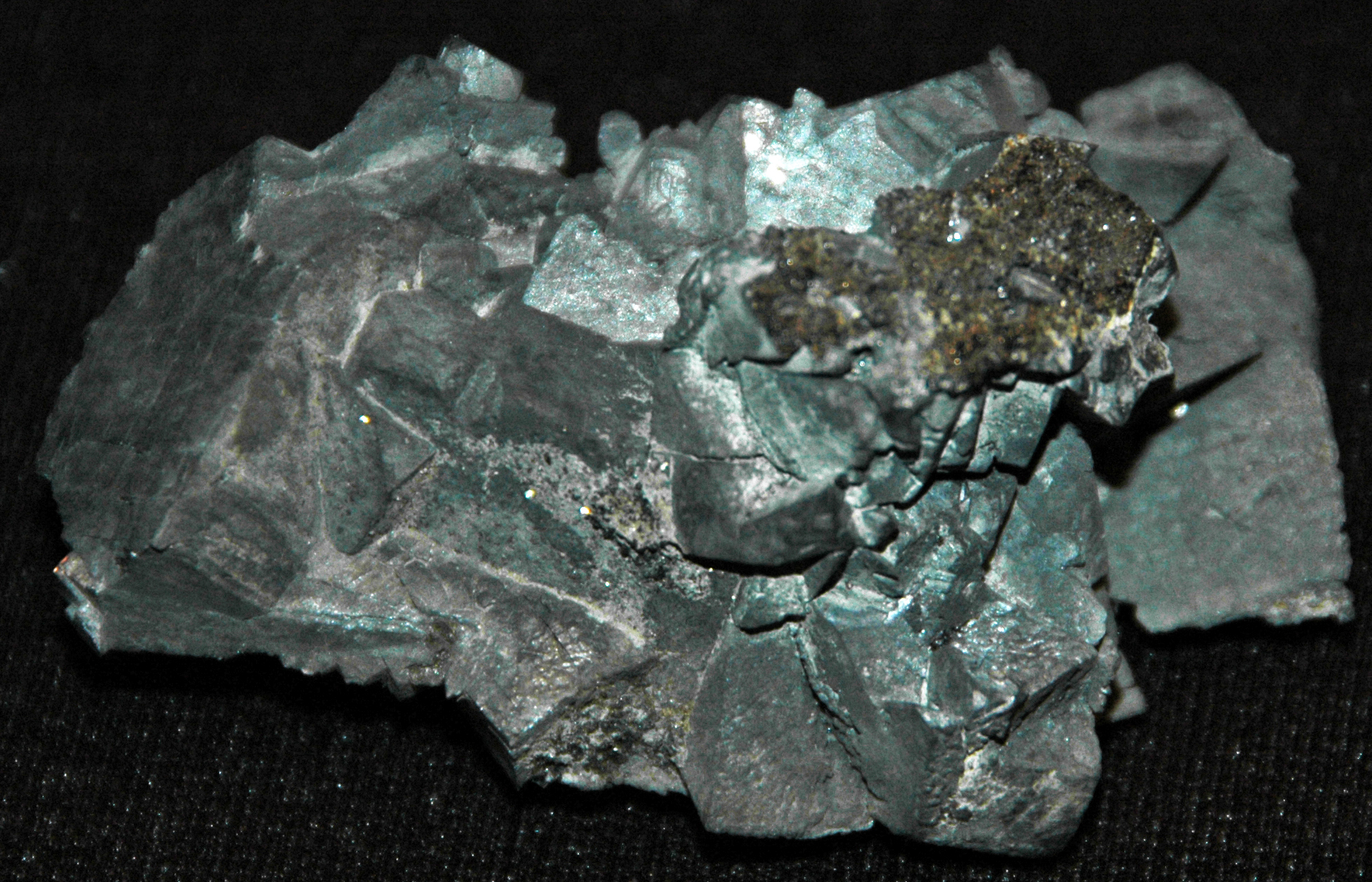
Galena ore sample from the old Frontenac Draper Lake Lead Mine, near Perth Road

Perth Road, formerly known as Perth Road Village, is a community in the Canadian province of Ontario. It is named for the Perth Road where it is located, which was one of the first roads to connect Kingston, Ontario on Lake Ontario to the then-major inland community of Perth, Ontario. Following the Perth Road, the village is 23 kilometres (14 miles) north of Kingston and 28 kilometres (17 miles) south of Westport, Ontario, which are the two closest major communities.
