= Samuel Chaffey =

Canadian businesspeople

- Born: 4 February 1793; England
- Died: 25 December 1821 (aged 28)
- Occupation: Businessman

Samuel Chaffey was born in England and immigrated to Upper Canada in 1816 with his brother Benjamin.

Samuel and Benjamin's move to Canada was a result of the economic slump in England following the Napoleonic War. Their history is tied to a variety of business ventures primarily in milling with water power. The business endeavours of Samuel, in particular, had varied results.

Samuel is remembered in Canadian history because of the expropriation of his last mills. They were dismantled to construct a lock on the new Rideau Canal. The lock-station was named for Samuel Chaffey and the present-day community of Chaffeys Locks soon developed at that site.

== Early life and Brockville business ==
Chaffey was born 4 February 1793 in Norton-sub-Hamdon, England, the fifth son of Benjamin Chaffey, a Somerset wool-stapler and woollens manufacturer, and Sarah Chaffey. He and his brother Benjamin initially settled at the Perth military settlement after arriving in Upper Canada in 1816, before relocating around 1817 to Brockville, where they entered the mercantile trade as B. and S. Chaffey, set up a small distillery, and rented the nearby farm and mills of Daniel Jones Sr.

While preparing the Brockville mills for operation, the Chaffeys were asked by settlers from the rear township of South Crosby to build a mill there. Benjamin secured a lease to lot 17, concession 8 — a clergy reserve lot with a suitable mill-seat — in April 1820, and construction began that summer under Samuel's direction.

The Brockville firm became seriously indebted, principally to the estate of Daniel Jones. Benjamin fled to the United States in late 1820 to escape prosecution, leaving Samuel to try to extricate their interests, an effort that was only partly successful: creditors won judgements against Samuel for £155 7s. 6d. in 1822 and £186 9s. 2d. in 1823, and more than £1,060 remained owed on outstanding notes by 1827.

== Death and dispute over the mills ==
Work began near Chaffey's Mills in 1826 on a lock for the proposed Rideau Canal, at a site considered one of the unhealthiest on the entire waterway because of the prevalence of malaria. Samuel Chaffey died of the fever on 26 July 1827.

== Personal life ==
Chaffey married Mary Ann Poole, originally from Somerset, on 25 December 1821; they had a son, Samuel Benjamin Chaffey.
