= Beverly Lake =

Beverly Lake may refer to:

== People ==
- I. Beverly Lake Jr. (1934–2019), American jurist and public official in North Carolina
- I. Beverly Lake Sr. (1906–1996), American jurist, law professor and politician in North Carolina

== Places ==
- Beverly Lake (Nunavut), Canada
- Lower Beverley Lake, Delta, Ontario, Canada
