= Sand Lake (Leeds and Grenville United Counties, Ontario) =

Coordinates: 44.568°N 76.263°W

Sand Lake is a lake on the Rideau Canal, located in the Township of Rideau Lakes, Ontario, Canada, in the ward of South Crosby. It is 891 hectares (2,202 acres) in surface area, with a maximum depth of 14.3 metres (47 ft) and a shore length of 65.5 kilometres (41 mi)

== History ==
Sand Lake is the southernmost of the original pre-Rideau Canal lakes in this area. To the north, water from Opinicon Lake flowed south through a small river to Sand Lake. At the southern outlet of Sand Lake, the 1-mile (2 km) long Jones Falls Rapids flowed into the White Fish River, which then flowed through Morton Bay on its way to Lower Beverley Lake and from there via the Gananoque River to Gananoque, Ontario. It was part of a native travel route that led from the Ottawa River, up the Rideau River, through the Rideau Lakes, and then to the St. Lawrence River at Gananoque. The lake was a bit smaller, and 8 feet (2 m) lower, than it is today. The name, Sand Lake, first appears on an 1816 map of the Rideau waterway drawn by Lieutenant Joshua Jebb, Royal Engineer.

In about 1820, settler Walter Davis Jr., set up a sawmill on the rapids between Opinicon Lake and Sand Lake in the location occupied by today's Davis Lock. That location was then known as Davis's Rapids. The British military purchased Davis's sawmill and property in 1829 so that a lock for the new Rideau Canal could be built there.

The lake was described in 1828 by surveyor John Burrows (who called it "Davies Lake") as “The view of Davies Lake is very pleasing. The many islands, as if floating on a transparent mirror which mellowed and reflected by the tint of the morning, strikes the contemplative mind with a sensation of pleasure not easily forgotten”

In late 1831, the level of the lake was raised by 8 feet (2 m) with the completion of the Jones Falls Dam, part of the Rideau Canal. That dam drowned the upper portion of the Jones Falls Rapids and extended the lake south to the locks at Jones Falls. At the north end of the lake, the completion of a dam and lock at Davis's Rapids in late 1831 provided for boat navigation between Sand Lake and Opinicon Lake. The Jones Falls Locks at the south end of Sand Lake provide a navigation connection to what is now Whitefish Lake (a manmade lake).

In about 1803, a miller's dam at today's Morton, backed up the flow from the White Fish River and sent it south to the Cataraqui River. In 1831, this was converted into a Rideau Canal dam, which changed the flow of water from Sand Lake so that it entered the Cataraqui River rather than the Gananoque River. Today Sand Lake is considered part of the Cataraqui River watershed.

== Ecology ==
Sand Lake is a mesotrophic lake with a phosphorus content of 13.8 ug/L and a calcium content of 24.8 mg/L (2018 values). The clarity of the lake is about 4.9 metres (16 ft) (2018 secchi average). The lake acidity is neutral, likely buffered by the underlying geology which mostly consists of crystalline limestone.

Sand Lake is located on the rocky exposures of the Frontenac Axis. Forests are generally made up of a mix of trees dominated by white pine, red oak, white oak, maple, and basswood.

In 2001 the lake was invaded by zebra mussels, which had the initial impact of increasing the clarity of the water by 30%. Zebra mussel populations have declined since the invasion and appear to be at a steady state.

The lake is host to healthy fish populations, including popular warm-water game fish such as largemouth bass and black crappie.

There are stable populations of common loons and ospreys on the lake. In the early 2000s, Canada geese started to nest on the lake. In about 2014, the first nesting bald eagles were observed on the lake. It was also at about that time that a blue heron rookery appeared on the lake.

== Cottaging ==
The first cottages appeared on the east side of the lake (the first area with road access to the lake) in the late 1800s. Two major cottage property developments occurred in the 1960s, the development of Birch Island by Birch Island Estates (which consists of approximately 60 cottages today), and the development of Sand Lake Estates by Opinicon Properties Ltd. (about 47 cottages today). Cottage development continues as farmers sell off their waterfronts, and the shoreline of the lake is about 75% developed.
