= North by Northeast =

Annual music festival in Toronto, Canada

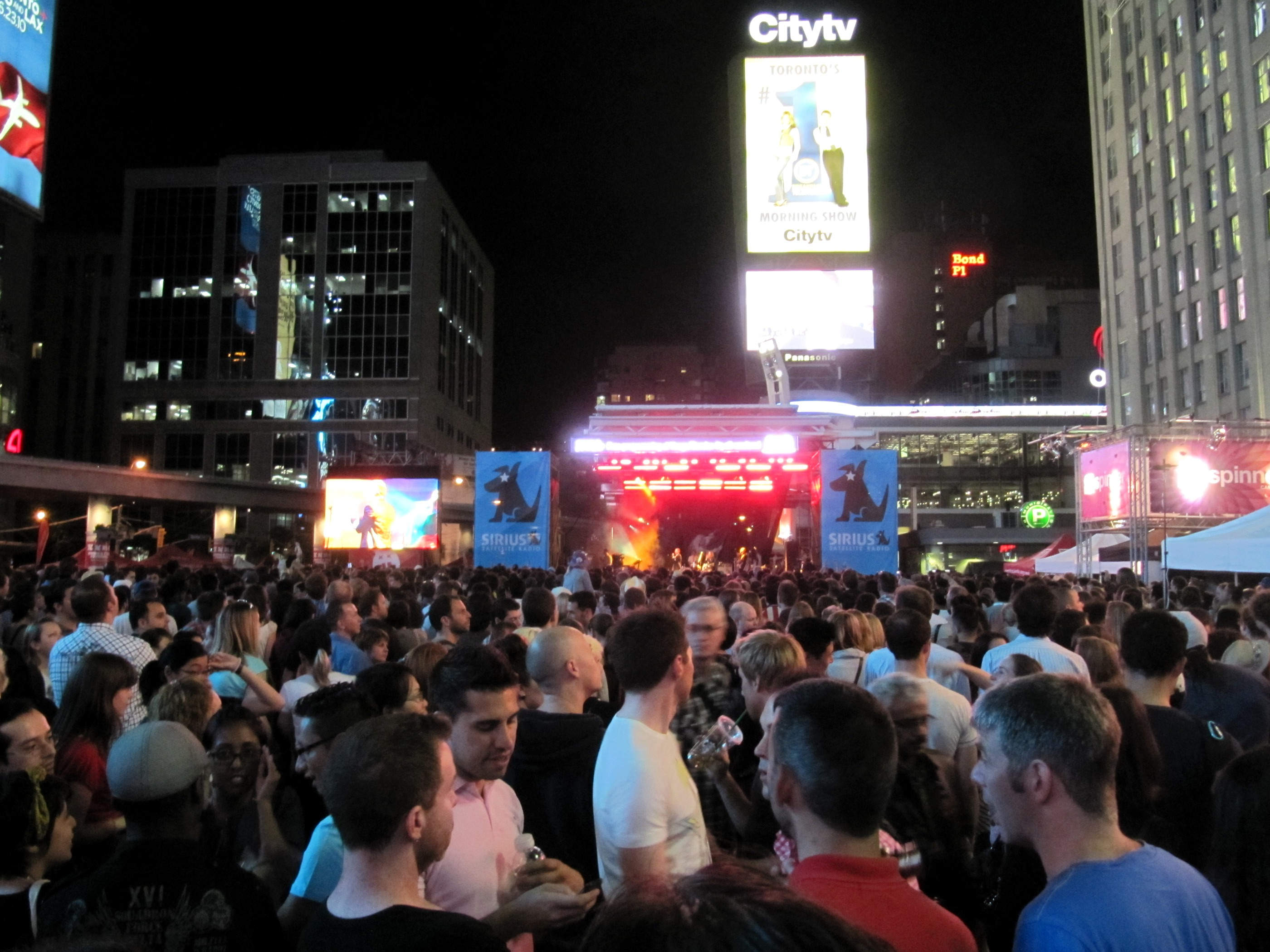
- North by Northeast 2011 in Yonge-Dundas Square (now Sankofa Square) on June 17, 2011
- Locations: Toronto, Ontario, Canada
- Years active: 1995–2019, 2022–
- Website: nxne.com

North by Northeast (or NXNE) is an annual music and arts festival held each June in Toronto, Ontario, Canada. The festival's main focus is live music, particularly emerging talent. Acts that have had break out appearances at NXNE at small venues early in their careers include Lizzo, Daniel Caesar, Run the Jewels, The Lumineers, Grimes, Gary Clark Jr., The Arkells, Feist, and Billy Talent. In its return post-COVID, the festival embraced its roots as a discovery event, programming exclusively in Toronto's live music venues.

Previously, the festival has also featured an eSports gaming tournament, comedy, a conversations series, a flea market and more.

== History ==
NXNE began in 1995, patterned on the South by Southwest festival in Austin, Texas. It was co-founded by Andy McLean, Now magazine editor Michael Hollett, Now executive editor Alice Klein, music programmer Derek Andrews and music promoter Yvonne Matsell. The SXSW organization is a minority ownership partner in NXNE. At that time it was a three-day festival with about 300 bands, mainly local, unsigned, independent artists. Over the years the festival expanded its attendance and began to feature well-known performers. The festival events took place in a number of venues, and participants purchased wristbands for entry into the events. In 2003, NXNE became the first promoters to produce live music in Toronto's Yonge Dundas Square. Gord Downie headlined NXNE's first Yonge Dundas Square show performing from new solo work. Downie's band The Tragically Hip played a 'secret show" at NXNE in 1997. Massive free concerts at Yonge Dundas Square and on Yonge Street stopped when COVID arrived. The festival again makes the club shows its priority post-COVID.

NXNE Yonge Street performers include: Iggy and the Stooges, St. Vincent, Run the Jewels, Lizzo, Chvrches, Devo, Mac DeMarco, Raekwon, The Flaming Lips, Stars, Billy Talent, De la Soul, Hollerado, Gza, Lights, Ludacris, Matthew Good and many more.

Previous showcasing Festival artists, sometimes in small venues before they were "names" also include: Post Malone, Lumineers, Father John Misty, Daniel Caesar, Arkells, Grimes, Future Islands, Sam Roberts, Schoolboy Q, Sarah Harmer, Vince Staples, Eagles of Death Metal and many more.

A film festival was added in 2001, screening primarily music-related features, documentaries and shorts. NXNE Film has screened films by directors such as Stewart Copeland (of rock band The Police), Don Letts, Guy Maddin, and Rob Heydon, and has hosted many world premieres, including Bruce McDonald's Broken Social Scene concert film, This Movie Is Broken, in 2010. Michael Tanner was the director of the festival. from 2007 to 2014.

In 2013, NXNE added comedy as a fourth stream, formally recognizing the growing number of standup, sketch, and improvisatory comics taking part in the festival since 2010. NXNE also added art as its fifth stream that year. including exhibits, projections, installations, performances and an art fair.

In 2014, NXNE marked its 20th consecutive year with over 1,000 music performers and an overall attendance of 350,000. The 2015 edition of NXNE ran for five days, June 17–21.

In 2016, under the direction of Michael Hollett, the festival organizers changed the format, with the goal of concentrating more highly attended performances in a large venue in the Port Lands area, at 51 Commissioners St. This concept ultimately alienated dedicated NXNE attendees - and proved to be an unsuccessful pilot project.

Following the trial of the Portlands concept, the festival returned to Yonge-Dundas Square (now Sankofa Square) and Clubland format. In addition to returning to their previously successful format, the festival also added a video gaming component, and gaming was among the topics discussed at the one day Interactive conference at Ryerson University. Yonge Dundas Square provided festival-goers the chance to play on a giant screen and to compete against each other with live play-by-play commentary.

There was no festival in 2020 as the COVID-19 pandemic caused its cancellation. The festival returned in 2022, embracing the original, discovery festival format.

== Music ==
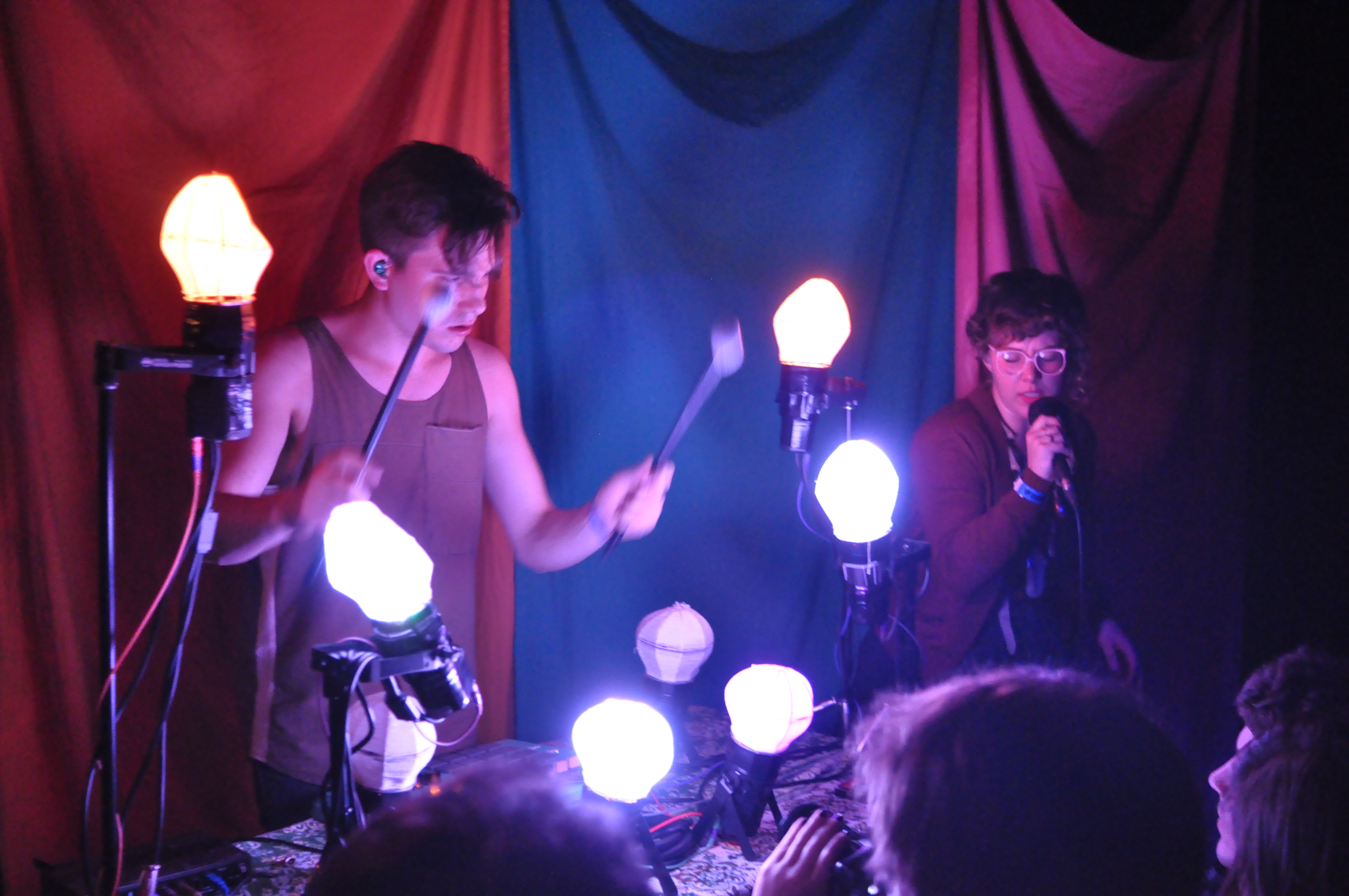
Purity Ring performs during NXNE 2012

Each year, NXNE Music presents hundreds of bands from Canada, the United States and around the world at more than 20 Toronto music venues. Venues host up to 7 bands each night (from 8 p.m. onward). The festival has many venues in Toronto's downtown core, along Queen Street West, College Street and the Bloor Street Annex. NXNE Music provides a platform for emerging artists, and allows fans to see "buzz bands" at small club venues. There previously were free outdoor concerts at Yonge-Dundas Square in downtown Toronto, with Canadian and international headline acts, including The Flaming Lips, Ludacris, Chvrches, Devo, Iggy and the Stooges, Billy Talent, A.A. Bondy, Uncle Sinner, Social Distortion, Raekwon & Ghostface Killah, De La Soul, Bad Religion, Stars, The Pharcyde, The Raveonettes, GZA, Descendents, Digable Planets, and K-os.

== NXNE Talks ==
NXNE Talks was an early panel that featured essential conversations about pressing issues in the music, eSports, gaming and entertainment industries. Past NXNE Talks speakers include: Stewart Copeland, The Sex Pistols' Johnny Rotten, Steve Earle, Bruce Cockburn, GZA, Peaches, Patti Smith, Thomas Dolby, The Rolling Stones' Andrew Loog Oldham, Fab Five Freddy, Nolan Bushnell and Bullmoose). NXNE Talks tend to focus on the "why" rather than the "how to".
