= Hotel Kenney =

Coordinates: 44°32′42″N 76°14′8″W

- Interactive map of the Hotel Kenney area

General information
- Location: 59 Kenney Road, Jones Falls, Township of Rideau Lakes, Ontario
- Opening: 1877

Technical details
- Floor count: 3

Website
- http://www.hotelkenney.com/

Hotel Kenney is a hotel near Jones Falls on the Rideau Canal in the township of Rideau Lakes, Ontario, Canada. Parks Canada describes the hotel as having been built as a fishing lodge in a period when excursion steamers operated along the canal.

The hotel was built in 1888, on the site of an earlier building which had been destroyed in a fire. It is open early May to late October.

The hotel was owned by members of the Kenney family for many years. In 2008, Franklin Folts, a clothing store owner and resident of Martha's Vineyard, bought the hotel at an auction.

The hotel was nominated in Today magazine as "Best Small Hotel in Canada," the hotel's website claims.
