= Porchfest =

Music event

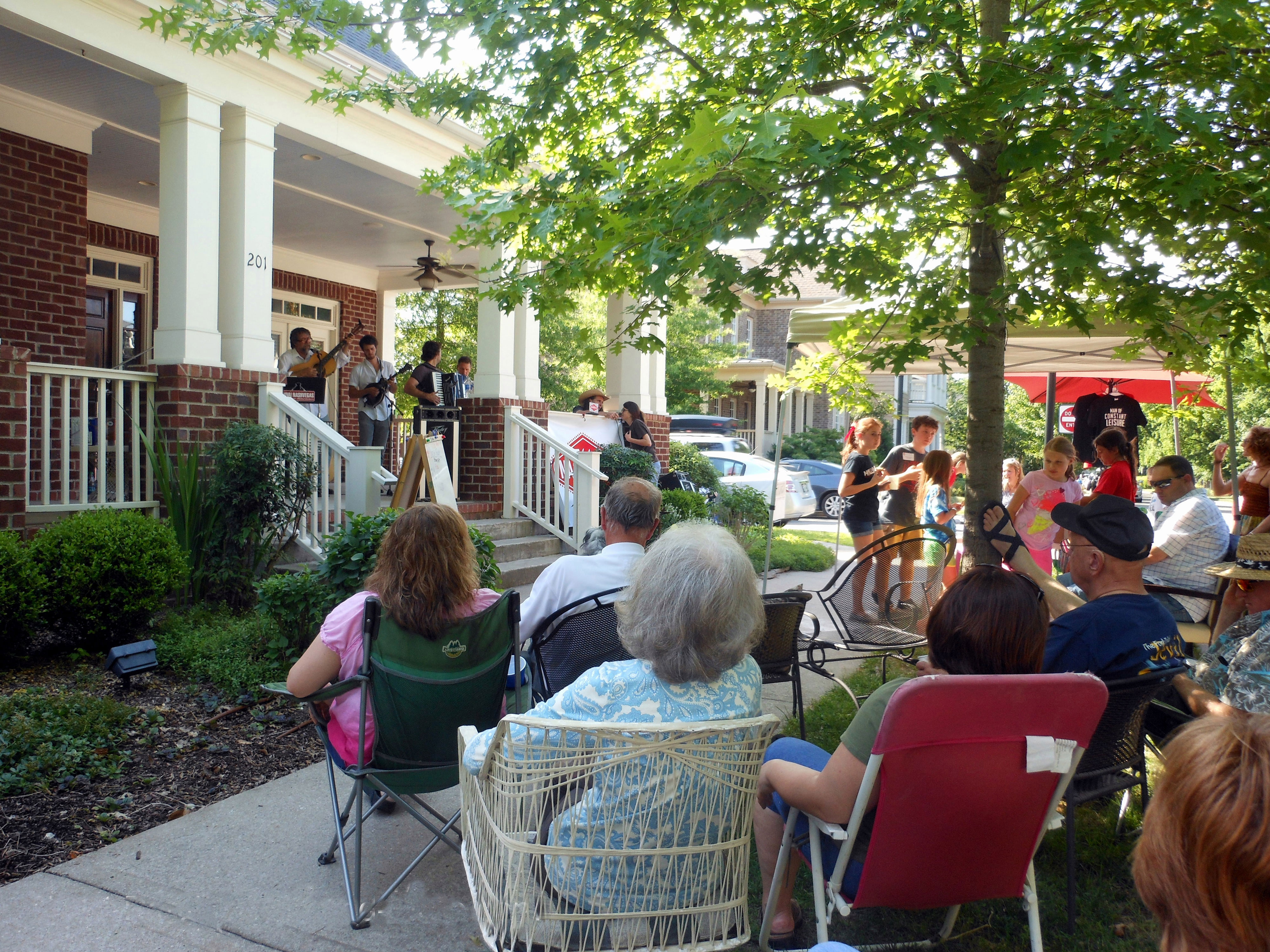
Fans Enjoying Franklin (Westhaven), Tennessee Porchfest

Porchfests are annual music events held across the United States and in Canada on front porches. Started in Ithaca, New York, in 2007, porchfest events bring local musicians and neighborhoods together to celebrate and create a sense of community.

Porchfest music festivals began as a means for neighbors and local community members to highlight their music on front porches. The concept was to find musicians and porches on which they would play. The original event in Ithaca, New York, started with about 20 musicians but has since grown to over 100.

Bands, singers, and instrumentalists participate in the festival for no other reason than to showcase their talents and engage the community. Music is diverse and can range from country to pop, classical, reggae, blues, rock, jazz, Latino, R&B, folk and many others. Some Porchfests have expanded to include other kinds of live performance: poets, spoken word artists, story tellers, dancers, and clowns, showcasing the wide range of artists in a town. Most performances are done acoustically. As well as installations of visual arts. Musicians and artists voluntarily take to the "stage" on porches at their designated times and perform for the public. Signs with artists' names and performance times are usually posted in front of porches and online.

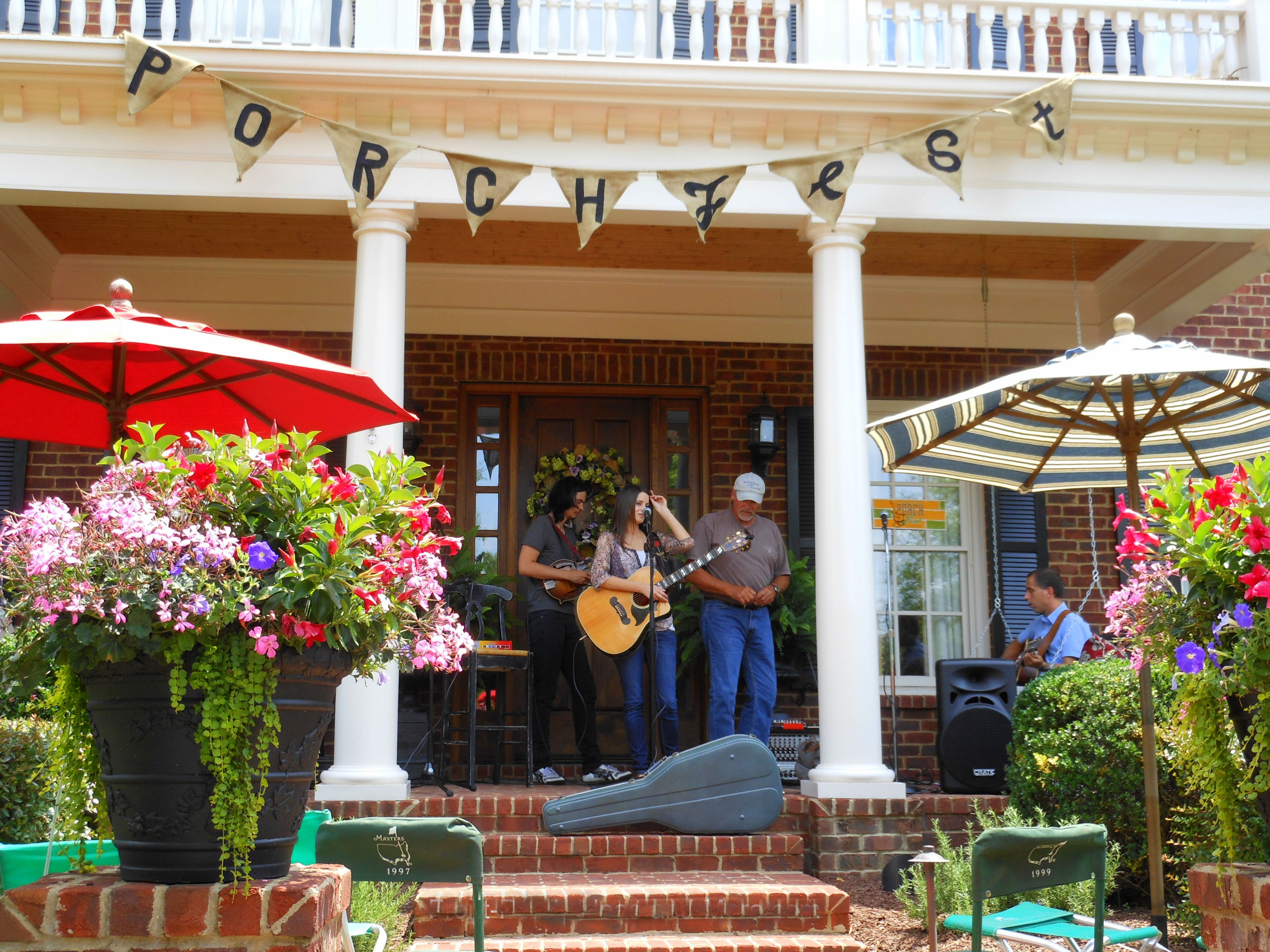
Music group performing at Franklin (Westhaven) Tennessee Porchfest celebration.

Volunteers and other organizations normally facilitate the event by selecting appropriate dates, acquiring musicians, and publicizing the event. Local residents volunteer their porches as a way to support the local music scene and interact with their neighbors. Events can last from a few hours to most of the day. Schedules and maps are usually posted online or in local media.

Because these are normally neighborhood events people walk, ride bikes or scooters, drive golf carts, or push strollers as they move from one porch to another along a determined route to partake in the festivities. Children often build lemonade stands to help quench thirst on hot days while vendors oftentimes provide ice cream, hot dogs, and other snacks. A few porchfests have expanded to include arts festivals as well.

== List of porchfests ==
These annual events can now be found being celebrated across the United States and Canada. This is a partial list of municipalities where Porchfests have taken place.

=== United States ===
==== Arizona ====
- Tucson

==== Colorado ====
- Boulder
- Denver

==== California ====
- Auburn
- Los Angeles
- Fresno
- Modesto
- Napa
- Sacramento
- San Francisco
- San Rafael
- Sunny Brae

==== Connecticut ====
- Bridgeport
- Milford
- Old Wethersfield

==== Delaware ====
- Wilmington

==== Florida ====
- Palatka
- Sanford
- Springfield, Jacksonville
- St. Augustine
- St. Petersburg

==== Georgia ====
- Athens
- Atlanta
- Brunswick
- Decatur

==== Iowa ====
- Iowa City
- Indianola
- North Liberty

==== Kansas ====
- Atchinson

==== Kentucky ====
- Kenwick

==== Maine ====
- Portland

==== Maryland ====
- Aberdeen
- Hagerstown
- Hyattsville
- South Four Corners (Silver Spring)
- Takoma Park
- University Park
- Woodmoor

==== Massachusetts ====
- Arlington
- Belmont
- Cambridge
- Jamaica Plain
- Malden
- Magnolia
- Maynard
- Medford
- Melrose
- Natick
- Newton
- Northborough
- Quincy
- Roslindale
- Somerville
- Swampscott
- Wakefield
- Watertown
- Wellfleet
- West Concord

==== Michigan ====
- Flint
- Mount Pleasant

==== Missouri ====
- Joplin
- Kansas City
- St. Louis

==== Nebraska ====
- Omaha
- Lincoln

==== New Jersey ====
- Asbury Park
- Caldwell
- Collingswood
- Highland Park
- Lambertville
- Metuchen
- Maplewood
- Montclair
- Moorestown
- Newark
- Princeton
- Red Bank
- Trenton
- Ventnor City

==== New York ====
- Binghamton
- Brooktondale
- Buffalo
- Cortland
- Irvington
- Ithaca (original)
- Mamaroneck
- Niagara Falls
- Owego
- Poughkeepsie
- Rhinebeck
- Rochester
- Sackets Harbor
- Stamford
- Walton

==== Ohio ====
- Akron
- Cleveland

==== Oklahoma ====
- Norman

==== Oregon ====
- Grants Pass
- Milwaukie

==== Pennsylvania ====
- Doylestown
- Easton (College Hill)
- Erie
- Langhorne
- Media
- Philadelphia
  - West Philadelphia
  - Roxborough-Manayunk
  - Mount Airy
- Scranton
- Wayne (South Wayne)
- West Chester

==== Rhode Island ====
- Providence

==== South Carolina ====
- Folly Island

==== Tennessee ====
- Franklin/Westhaven
- Highland Park in Chattanooga, Tennessee

==== Texas ====
- San Antonio

==== Utah ====
- Salt Lake City

==== Washington ====
- Tacoma
- Edmonds

==== Washington, D.C. ====
- Adams Morgan
- Capitol Hill
- Petworth

=== Canada ===
==== Alberta ====
- Medicine Hat

==== Ontario ====
- Belleville
- Hintonburg, Ottawa
- Peterborough
- Vankleek Hill
- Westport
- Whitevale

==== Quebec ====
- Hudson
- Montreal
