= Elgin, Ontario =

Village in Ontario, Canada

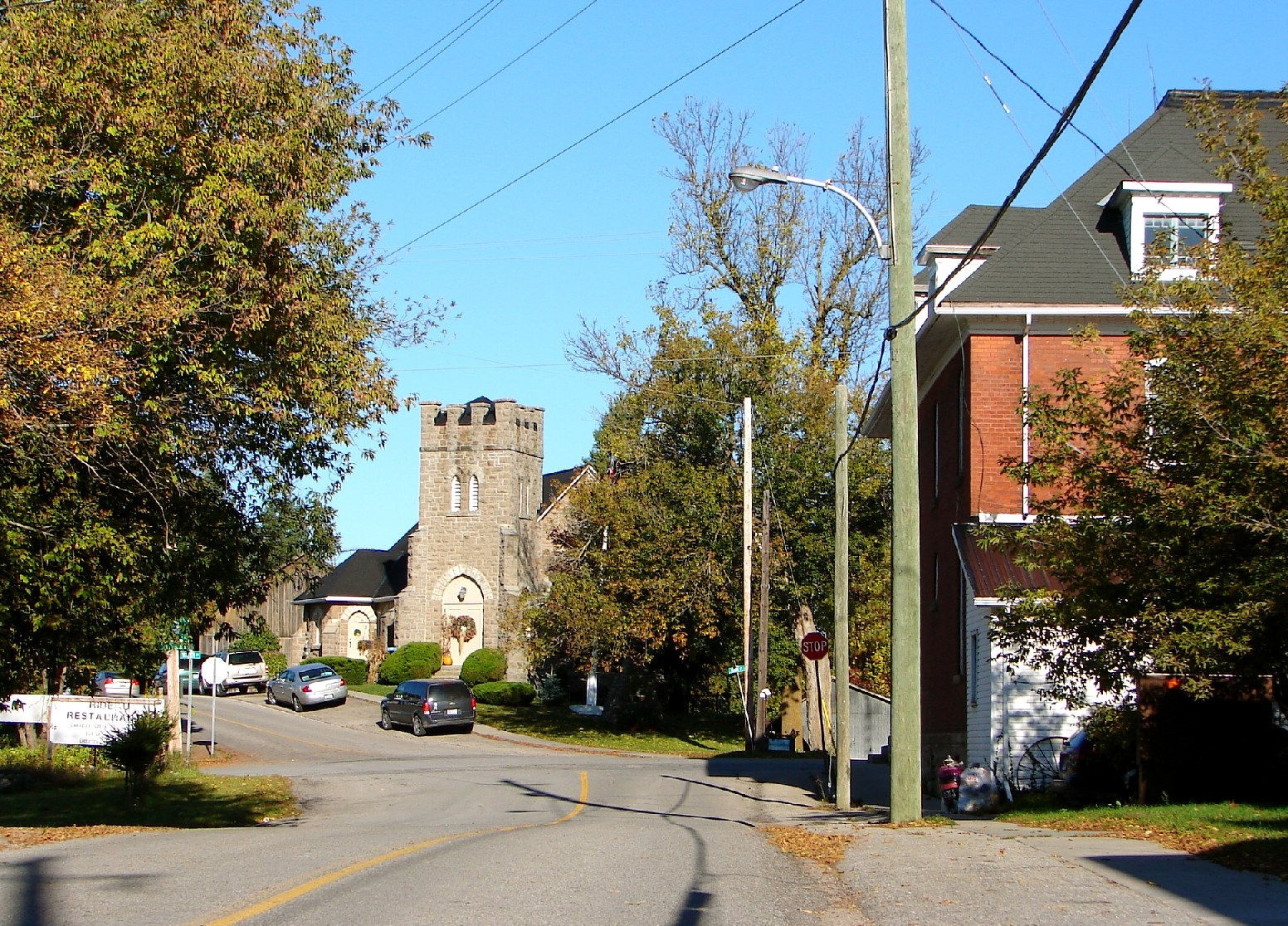
Street view of Elgin

Elgin is an unincorporated village in the township of Rideau Lakes, Ontario. Situated off highway 15, about 50km north of Kingston, Ontario, it has a population of around 300.
