= Delta, Ontario =

Delta
- Village
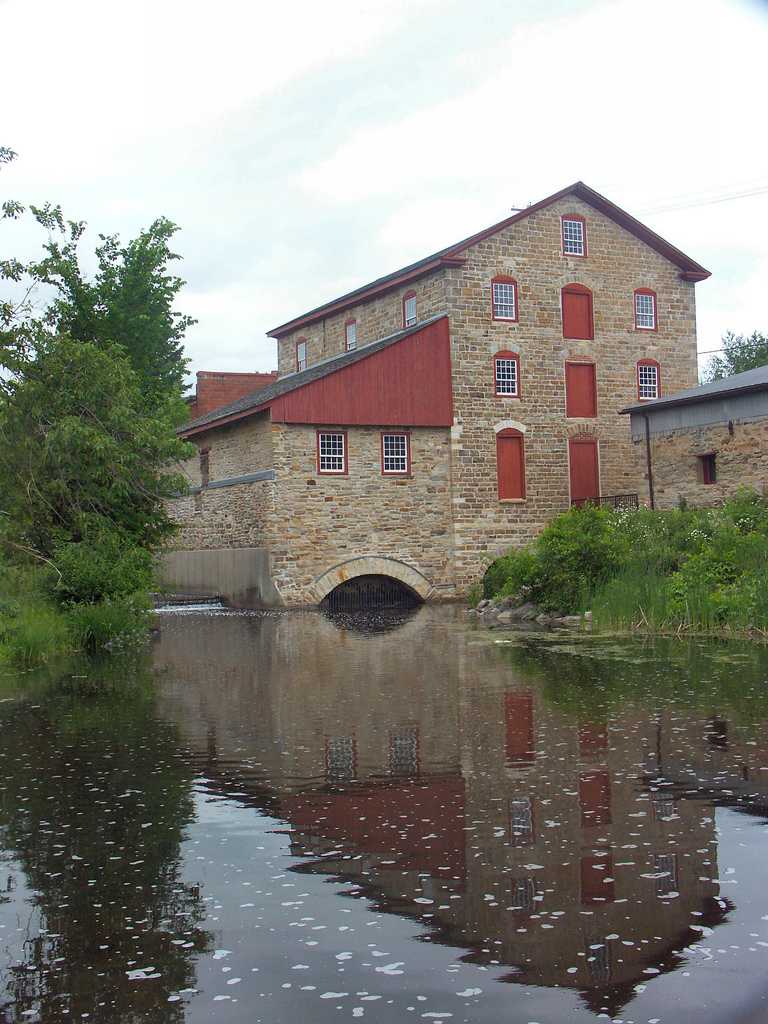
- Old Stone Mill

- Location within Ontario
- Coordinates: 44°36′31.895″N 76°07′24.276″W
- Country: Canada
- Province: Ontario
- County: Leeds and Grenville
- Settled: 1790s

Government
  - Federal riding: Leeds—Grenville
  - Prov. riding: Leeds—Grenville
- Time zone: UTC−5 (EST)
  - Summer (DST): UTC−4 (EDT)
- Postal Code: K0E
- Area code: 613

Delta, Ontario, is a community in the Township of Rideau Lakes, Leeds and Grenville County in Eastern Ontario. The village is located between two lakes, Upper Beverley and Lower Beverley, along highway 42, approximately 15 kilometres west of Athens, Ontario and 28 kilometres east of Westport, Ontario.

== History ==
The founder of Delta was Abel Stevens, a loyalist from Vermont who arrived in this area in February 1794 with several families and squatted on upper reaches of Plum Hollow Creek. The area was unsurveyed and Stevens petitioned to be granted land around both the rapids at Delta and the "Great Falls" at Lyndhurst, applying to set up an iron foundry in that location (Lyndhurst). The first survey lines were run into the area by William Fortune in July 1794 and then in 1795, surveyor Lewis Grant ran the initial survey of what was to become Bastard Township. In 1796 sufficient surveying had been done to grant Stevens 5 lots in Bastard Township (on June 2, 1796 - 700 acres total) including 3 over what is today's Delta (Lots 23, 24 & 25 in the 9th Concession of Bastard Township).

In about 1796, Abel Stevens had a wooden sawmill built, the mill is recorded in Lewis Grant's 1797 field notes as "Wm. Stevens Mill" - William was Abel's cousin. It is assumed this first sawmill was built sometime after Stevens received his land grant (June 2, 1796). A wooden grist mill was added later (likely powered by the same waterwheel as the sawmill). The exact location of the first mill uncertain, it is shown as being on the south side of the creek on Grant's 1797 survey map of Bastard Township. That location is believed to be somewhere near the intersection of today's Matthew Street and King Street since Recreation Street and the Drive Shed for the Old Stone Mill are located over the original creek bed. Anecdotal history (memoirs of Niel Sliter) indicate that the mill burned down twice.

Early references (Stevens' petitions) to the area are as Stevenstown, as the regional area (township) not a village, but later this name became synonymous with the fledgling village that developed after the first mill was built. Stevens was responsible for local roads that helped to develop Delta, firstly, in 1794, a rough road from Brockville to the Delta area (built for the settlers wagons), then a road to the Lyndhurst area, and then, in 1798, he had a road built from Lyndhurst to the main road near Kingston Mills. These collectively became known as the "Kingston Back Road."

From 1803 to 1808, Abel Stevens leased his mill to Nicholas Mattice. In June 1808 he sold his mills and the land they were on to William Jones. By 1808 a second sawmill had built in the village by Abel Steven's Jr. on today's Foundry Creek.

In 1810, William Jones and his business partner Ira Schofield, started construction on a new mill, a 3 1/2-storey, Georgian architecture style, stone mill, using an automated mill design by American inventor Oliver Evans. The mill was located on bedrock, north of Stevens' original mill, and the creek from the Upper Beverley lakes was diverted to this new mill. Abel Stevens' original c. 1796 dam likely raised the water in the original lower Upper Beverley Lake by about 4 to 5 feet (based on the appearance of the two Upper Beverley lakes on Grant's 1797 survey map of Bastard Township), the new stone mill, which acted in part as its own dam, with an adjacent bywash, raised the water level by about 9 feet (+/-), forming one lake where there had originally been two.

In 1811 construction started on a new Baptist Church, today's St. Paul's Anglican Church (purchased by the Anglicans in 1827).

By 1816, the small community, now known as Stone Mills, had between 10 and 20 houses (an 1816 letter indicates about 20 houses and a July 1816 map shows 10 buildings, including the Old Stone Mill, in Delta). In about 1827, the village of Stone Mills was renamed Beverley after Sir John Beverley Robinson (the anecdotal story is that Sir John promised to donate a bell to the Anglican Church (just purchased from the Baptists) if they would name the village Beverley - and so the village was renamed and the church got its bell). An 1828 map states "Beverley is composed of abt 30 houses".

In 1828, the temperance movement in Upper Canada got its start in Delta with a 4 hour sermon delivered on June 10, 1828, by Dr. Peter Schofield, an eminent medical doctor, distressed by the impact of drunkenness on society. Dr. Schofield delivered the sermon in the Old Stone Mill, a highlight of which was his rather vivid description of death by ″spontaneous combustion.″ He noted that ″it is well authenticated, that many habitual drinkers of ardent spirits are brought to their end by what is called spontaneous combustion″ and then went on to describe in some detail an event he’d witnessed.

One of the most prominent residents of Delta was Walter H. Denaut. Born in Prescott, Denaut worked in Delta for a time before returning permanently in 1839, opening up a general store. In 1849 Denaut built himself a very impressive family home, today’s Denaut Mansion Country Inn. In 1850 he bought the Old Stone Mill from the previous owner, Amelia Macdonell. He invested heavily in the mill, including switching power from a waterwheel to turbines in the 1860s and changing it from a custom mill to a merchant mill. The mill was known at that time as Denaut's Mills.

In 1857 when a new post office was applied for, the name Beverley was already taken and the name Delta was chosen because the shape of the two Beverley Lakes, connected by the village, resembles triangles - the shape of the fourth letter of the Greek alphabet, delta.

For years Delta was the only significant community in the region due to the Old Stone Mill with farmers going to the mill to get their wheat ground on a custom basis (1/12 to the miller with the rest returned to the farmer as flour). Businesses such as merchant shops, taverns, inns, blacksmiths were established to service this influx of people, Delta was the regional service centre. By 1851 the population of Delta was 250 and an 1897 fire insurance map shows a population of 500.

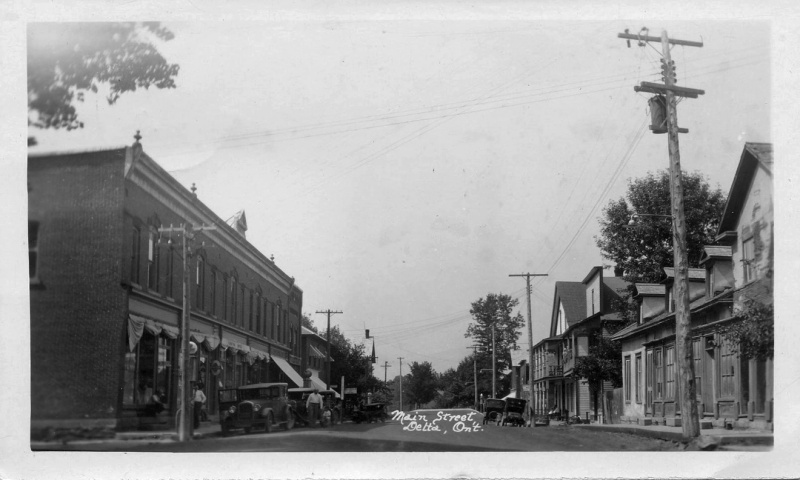
Main street looking north, circa 1930

From early 1888 through to mid-1952, Delta was served by the Brockville, Westport & Sault Ste Marie Railway. The village had one of the larger stations on the line. Today, sections of the train bed serve as roads and/or paths used by all terrain vehicles.

The village's Old Stone Mill saw use for 150 years, from 1810 through 1960, and played an important role in the area's harvesting needs. In 1963, Hastings Steele, the mill's final owner, deeded the property to a group of trustees for $1. These trustees formed the core of The Delta Mill Society who extensively restored the mill (rescue rehabilitation in 1973-74 and major conservation rehabilitation in 1999-2004) and have it open to the public during the summer and for special events. In 1970 the mill was designated a National Historic Site of Canada.

Another influential local business was the Confederated Foods syrup bottling plant, employing many residents for decades and providing an extra attraction to the village's annual maple syrup festival.

== Attractions ==
One of the main attractions in Delta is the Old Stone Mill National Historic Site. Built in 1810, the old mill has been restored to its former glory by the Delta Mill Society, a non-profit volunteer group. The mill is open to the public from the Victoria Day long weekend in May to Labour Day in September and during special Delta events (Maple Syrup Festival, Delta Harvest Festival and Celebrating the Season). In addition to its impressive architecture, it features an operating water wheel and mill stones. Heritage grain is ground into flour using the old mill stones several times during the season.

Delta's largest event is the Delta Agricultural Fair, held annually at the end of July. Operated by the Delta Agricultural Society, originally the fair's location rotated between Delta, Athens and Gananoque. Delta eventually became its permanent home, and in 1911 the Society purchased the current fair grounds. The fair continues to attract thousands of people every year, helping to sustain the local economy and heritage.

The Delta Maple Syrup Festival is a annual spring community celebration held on the third weekend in April celebrating the sweet taste of spring. Beginning as a 1967 national centennial project, the Delta Maple Syrup Festival also attracts thousands of tourists to the village each spring. As well as celebrating the wonderful combination of syrup and pancakes, the festivities include entertainment, games and family activities.

The Delta Harvest Festival is held on the Saturday of the weekend prior to the Thanksgiving Long Weekend. It is a celebration of the fall harvest, an important event for a community with deep agricultural roots.

Celebrating the Season was held on Saturdays in late November and in December but has since been permanently closed. The main feature was Lower Beverley Lake Park which was magically lit with over 80,000 lights. Local churches put on an evening meal for each Saturday. Lower Beverly Lake Park has since donated all of their decorations to the township to be used in Delta and surrounding towns.

Other attractions and services in both the village and area include:

- The Denaut Mansion
- Lower Beverley Lake Park
