= Jones Falls Dam =

Dam in Ontario, Canada

Coordinates: 44°32′56″N 76°14′15″W

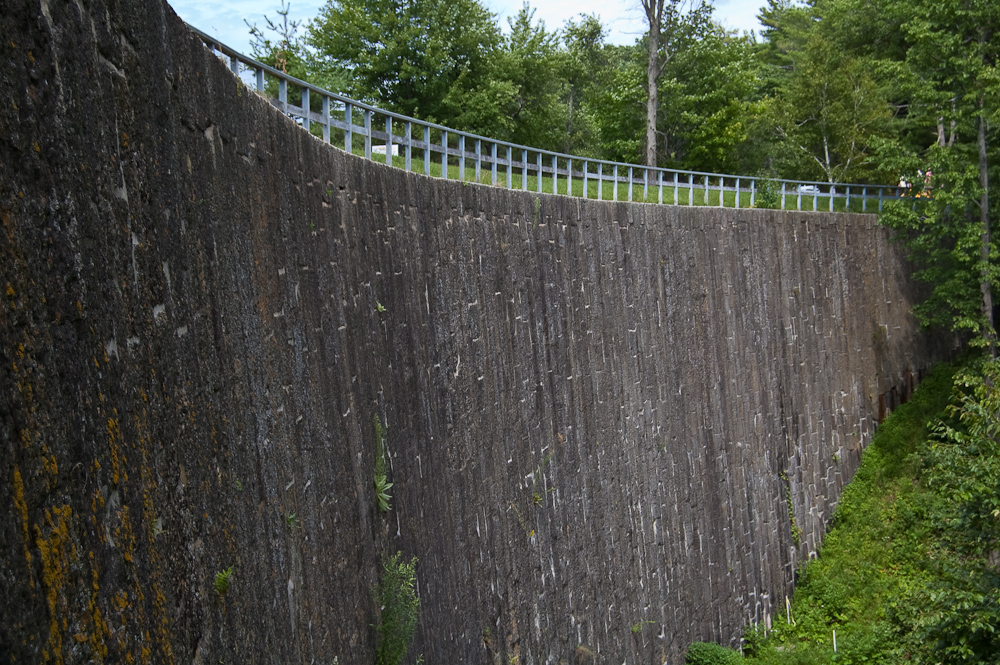
- Interactive map of Jones Falls Dam
- Country: Canada
- Location: Leeds and Grenville United Counties, Ontario
- Status: Operational

Jones Falls Dam is a dam on the Rideau Canal located in Rideau Lakes, Leeds and Grenville United Counties, Ontario, Canada, that was built between 1828 and 1831 to tame the mile-long series of rapids and falls that flowed from Sand Lake and into the White Fish River (now drowned).

== History ==
The dam, designed by the British Royal Engineers under the direction of Lt. Colonel John By, was built by crews working for contractor John Redpath. It was built by hand, with the assistance of a few draft animals. When completed in late 1831, the Jones Falls dam was the highest dam in North America, a major accomplishment of early 19th century engineering. The dam was built at the head of a bedrock canyon, located part way up the rapids, a location that allowed the arch shape of the stonework of the dam to lock into the bedrock of the canyon walls. The dam has three main components: 1) the keywork, the dressed (shaped) stones that form the backing of the dam, 2) an impermeable layer placed in front of the keywork and 3) the dam apron that protects the front of the dam.

The stones, large blocks of Potsdam sandstone, were quarried 9 km (5.6 mi) away, in a quarry located just outside of present day Elgin. In 1827, a road was built from the quarry to Jones Falls, in order to haul the stones to be used for the dam and the locks. Rough cut stones from the quarry were hauled to the site where the Master mason would direct his masons to do the finishing work. The stones were lifted into place using metal tongs (very large timber tongs) attached to a block and tackle hung from a tripod. The dimples in the stones for those tongs can still be seen in the original stones today.

The stonework for the dam is about 8.2 m (27 ft) thick at the base of the dam, tapering to 3.7 m (12 ft) at the top. The stonework is 17.3 m (57 ft) high from its bedrock foundation. An earthen berm on the top of the dam adds about another 1.2 m (3 ft) in height, making the total height, from base of foundation to top, about 18.3 m (60 ft). The backing face of the dam is set back on about a 1:10 incline

In front of the stones is a 1.5 m (5 ft) thick impermeable layer made up of grouted broken stone, which is small angular stone set in hydraulic cement. Normally clay puddle would have been used to form this impermeable layer, but clay of suitable quality ran out early during construction, and grouted broken stone was used as a substitute.

The apron for the dam extends out about 50 m (160 ft). It was created by hauling rubbish (earth) material using horse drawn carts from a location just to the west of the dam.

The dam was built with the aid of sluiceways in the dam to allow the river to flow through the dam during construction. The first sluiceway was near the base of the dam on the east side. The second was about 6 m (20 ft) above the base on the west side of the dam. A coffer dam located near the head of rapids was used to block off the rapids until each sluiceway could be sealed up. A deep waste water weir, its channel blasted through a bedrock ridge to the south of the dam, allowed the top of the dam to be completed.

When completed, the dam raised the water in its location by 13.7 m (45 ft), putting a navigation depth of water into the upper sill of the top lock at Jones Falls and also into the lower sill of Davis Lock, at the head of Sand Lake, which was raised by 2.4 m (8 ft) due to the dam at Jones Falls. Typical of most of the Rideau Canal locks, those locks were built "in the dry" - above the pre-existing water level. It was the completion of the dam that created a navigation depth of flooding into those locks.

== Statistics ==
The dam is approximately 350 feet (107 m) long (the length of the arch at the top), 60 feet (18 m) high and 27 feet (8 m) thick at the base. The base (canyon wall to canyon wall) is 100 feet (30 m) long.

== Of Interest ==
The Jones Falls Great Arch Dam is also known as the Whispering Dam since the shape of the stone face of the dam allows sound to travel along the face. Someone speaking in normal conversation tone at one end of the dam can be heard by someone standing at the other end.

This, (and some other smaller dams on the Rideau Canal) may be the only vertically coursed stone arch dams in the world.
