= Westport, Ontario =

Westport
- Village (lower-tier)
- Village of Westport
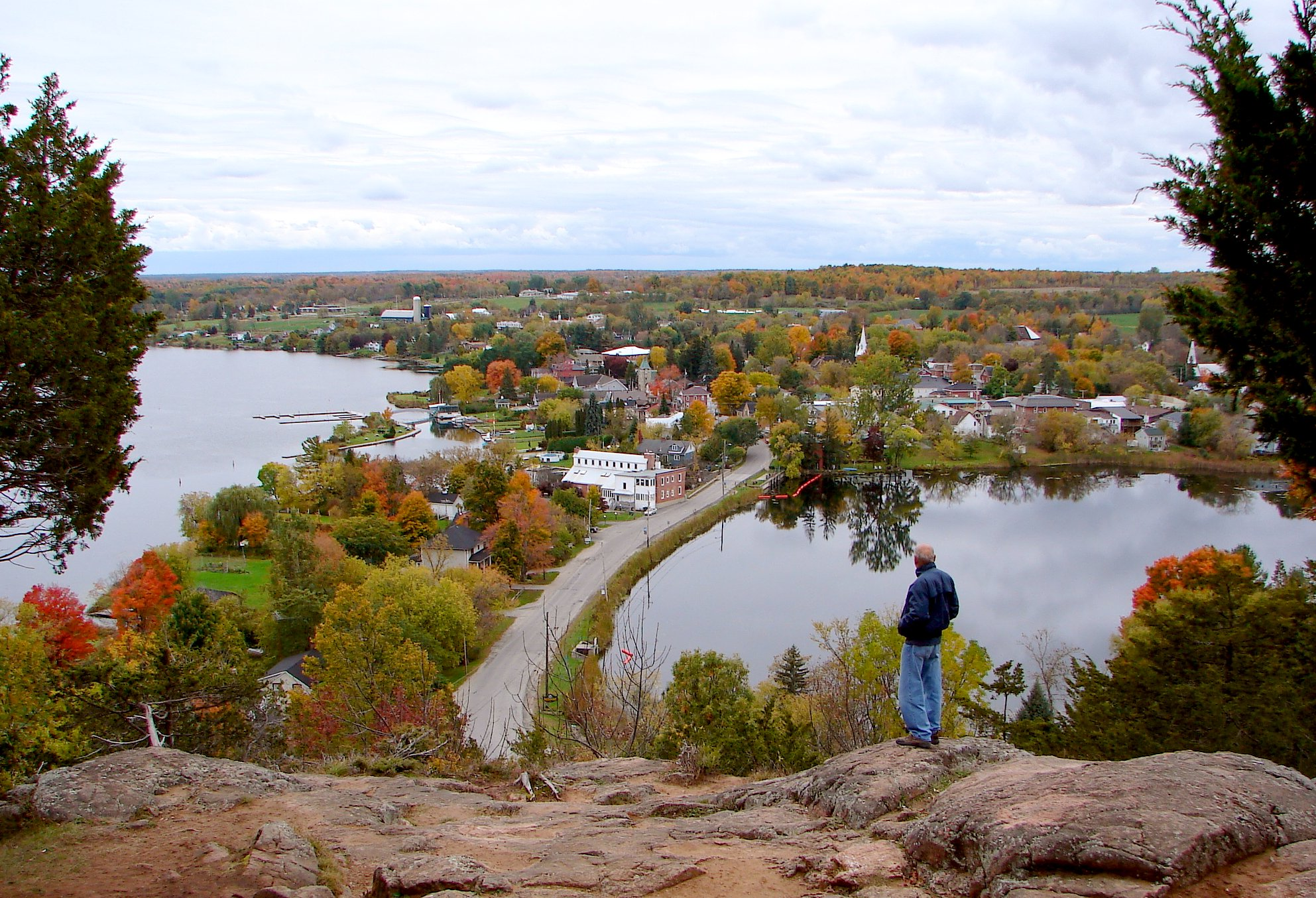
- View of Westport from Foley Mountain in 2009
- Motto: Timeless Lakeside Village
- Location within United Counties of Leeds and Grenville Location within Southern Ontario
- Coordinates: 44°41′N 76°24′W
- Country: Canada
- Province: Ontario
- County: Leeds and Grenville
- Settled: 1820s
- Incorporated: 1904

Government
  - Mayor: Robin Patricia Jones
  - Fed. riding: Leeds—Grenville—Thousand Islands and Rideau Lakes
  - Prov. riding: Leeds—Grenville—Thousand Islands and Rideau Lakes

Area
  - Land: 2.19 km^{2} (0.85 sq mi)

Population (2021)
  - Total: 634
  - Density: 289/km^{2} (750/sq mi)
- Time zone: UTC-5 (EST)
  - Summer (DST): UTC-4 (EDT)
- Postal Code: K0G 1X0
- Area code: 613
- Website: villageofwestport.ca

Westport is a village in the United Counties of Leeds and Grenville, Eastern Ontario, Canada. It lies at the west end of Upper Rideau Lake, at the head of the navigable Rideau Canal system, 100 km (62 mi) southwest of Ottawa.

The village of Westport was incorporated as an independent municipality in 1904. It is an enclave within the Township of Rideau Lakes.

== History ==
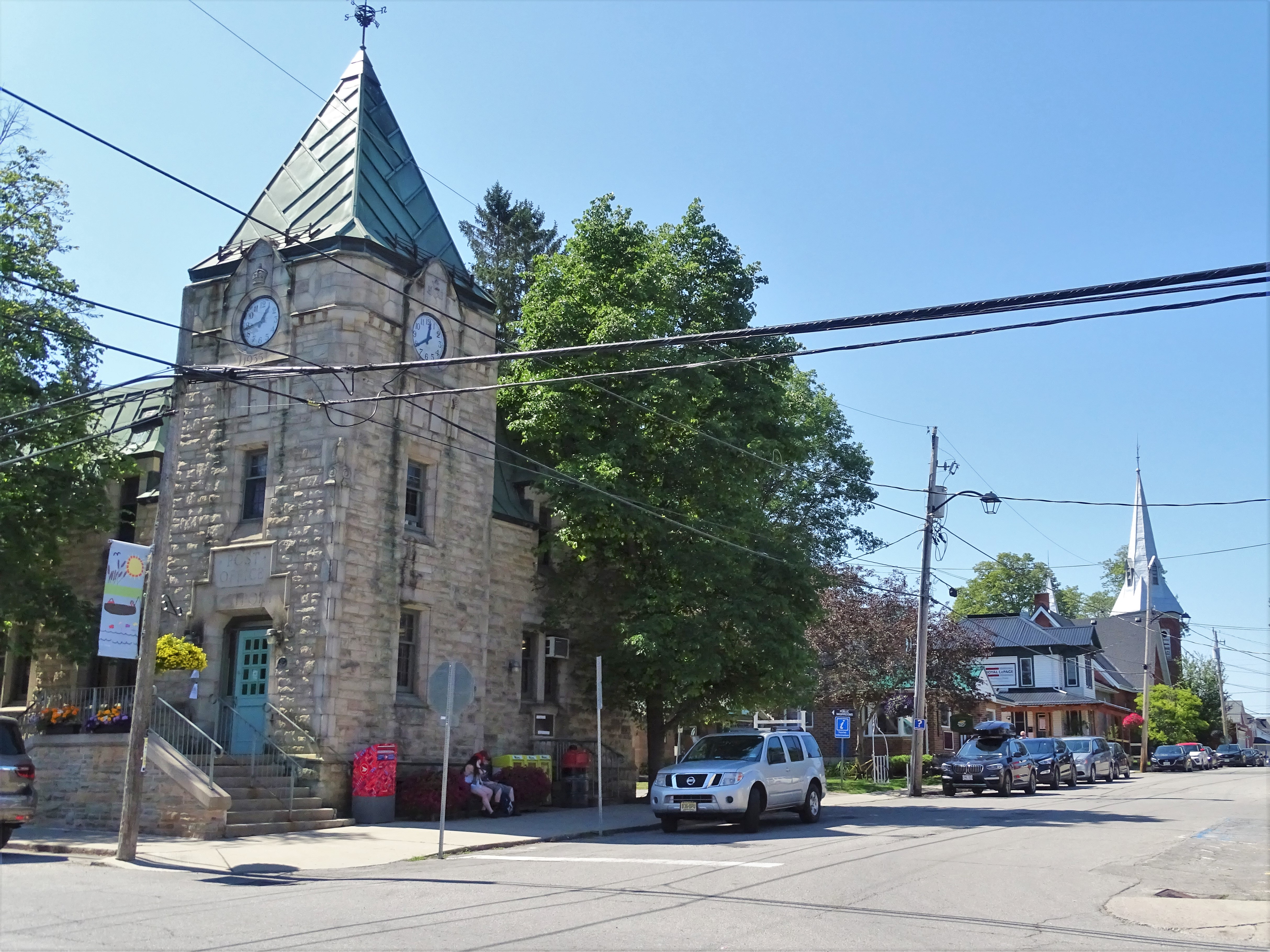
Westport Post Office in 2021

The first settlers to the Westport area arrived in the period between 1810 and 1820. The land on which Westport now sits was originally granted by the Crown to a Mr. Hunter, but he never settled in the area and it was eventually purchased by Reuben Sherwood in 1817. Some of this land was later purchased by the Stoddard and Manhard families. The small community was known as Head of the Lake. In 1828, Stoddard built a saw mill and in 1829 the Manhards built a saw mill and grist mill. It became known at that time as Manhard's Mills. Two local merchants, Aaron Chambers and Lewis Cameron, named the village Westport in 1841, the name reflecting its location at the west end of Upper Rideau Lake. The post office dates from 1845. The village of Westport was incorporated in 1904 when it separated from North Crosby Township.

Like much of the surrounding area, Westport received a large number of Irish immigrants in the 1840s through the 1860s, following the Great Famine. St. Edward's Catholic Church at the corner of Concession and Bedford, built in 1859, was an early cultural centre for the largely Catholic Irish immigrants.

Westport remained a thriving commercial centre through the 19th century and into the 20th century. The building of the Rideau Canal allowed goods to be shipped north to Ottawa and south to Kingston. In 1882, an entrepreneur named R.G. Harvey proposed an ambitious project to build a railway from Brockville to Sault Ste. Marie. The project ran out of money after the section from Brockville to Westport had been completed in 1888. The Brockville-Westport line moved goods, mail and people to and from the St. Lawrence River and Westport. Many cheese factories were located between Brockville and Westport. The train was therefore known as the "cheese run." The rail line also brought tourists north to Westport starting a tradition of Westport as a tourist destination. The last train travelled the Brockville, Westport and North-Western Railway line in 1952.

=== Recent events ===
In June 2013, longtime Mayor Bill Thake died of a stroke at age 77; the village council appointed councillor Dan Grunig to take his place in July and called an election for September 30 to fill the vacant councillor's seat. Elected as mayor is Robin Jones,

In June, 2021, Westport celebrated its first Pride Week.

== Demographics ==
In the 2021 Census of Population conducted by Statistics Canada, Westport had a population of 634 living in 334 of its 359 total private dwellings, a change of 7.5% from its 2016 population of 590. With a land area of 2.19 km^{2} (0.85 sq mi), it had a population density of 289.5/km^{2} (749.8/sq mi) in 2021.

Historical census populations – Westport, Ontario

Year	Pop.	±%
1901	717	—
1911	803	+12.0%
1921	741	−7.7%
1931	753	+1.6%
1941	726	−3.6%
1951	722	−0.6%
1956	704	−2.5%

Year	Pop.	±%
1961	711	+1.0%
1966	616	−13.4%
1971	601	−2.4%
1976	644	+7.2%
1981	621	−3.6%
1986	694	+11.8%
1991	664	−4.3%

Year	Pop.	±%
1996	683	+2.9%
2001	647	−5.3%
2006	645	−0.3%
2011	628	−2.6%
2016	590	−6.1%
2021	634	+7.5%

Population counts are not adjusted for boundary changes.
Source: Statistics Canada

Mother tongue (2021):

- English as first language: 96.9%
- French as first language: 3.1%
- English and French as first language: 0%
- Other as first language: 0%

== Climate ==
On May 6, 1966, an F0 tornado ripped through the village of Westport damaging homes and farm bulldings, uprooting trees and cutting telephone communications. No one was injured.

On June 18, 1984, an F2 tornado caused extensive damage to property East of Westport along the Upper Rideau Lake.

== Tourism and attractions ==
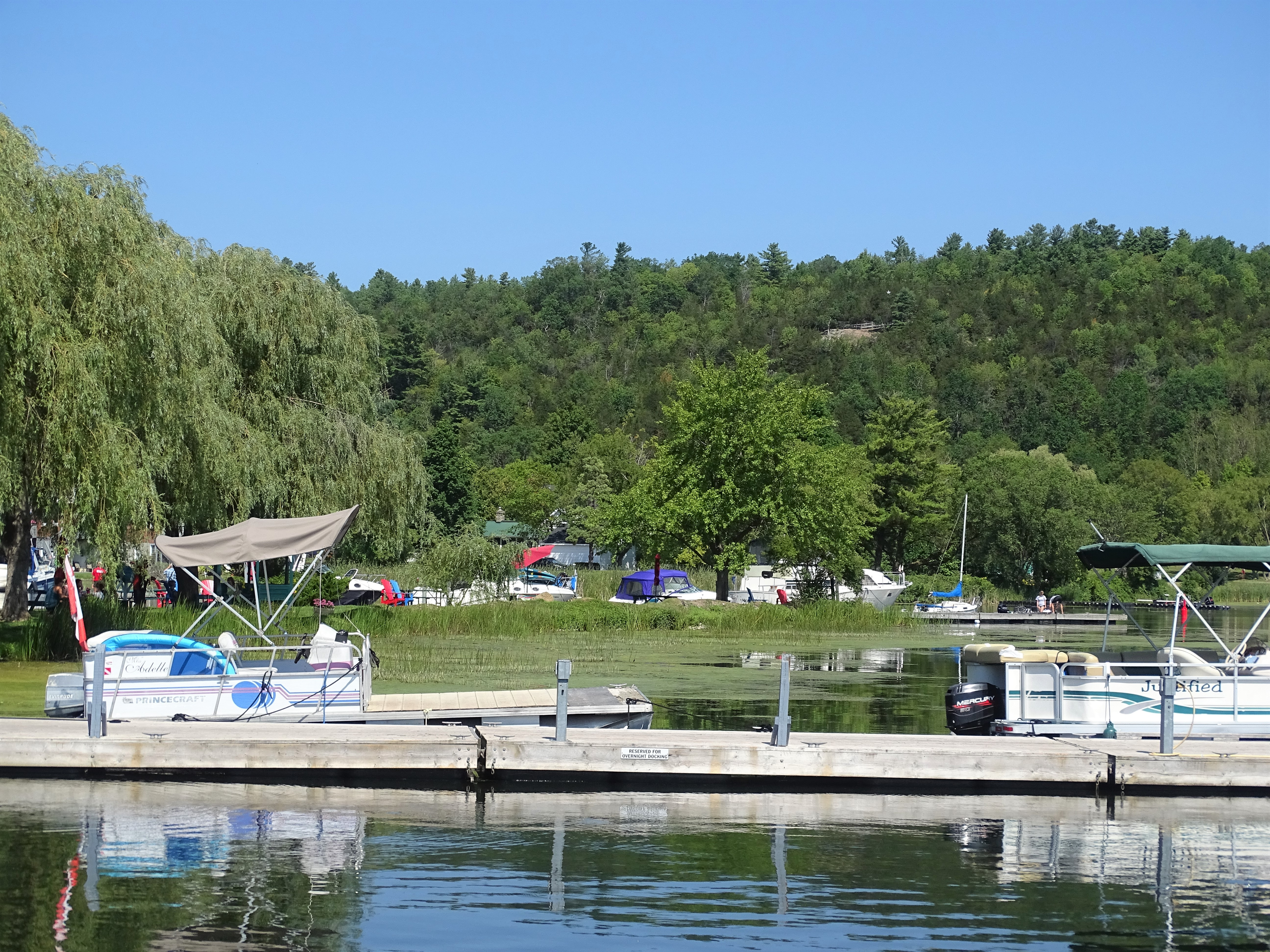
Westport Harbour

A public wharf on a man-made island has dock space for up to 30 vessels. The Westport Harbour also has a picnic area, barbecues, and sewage pumpout facilities.

Fishing in the area is particularly good because of the fish-rearing ponds set up by the Provincial Government in 1957. Yellow perch, smallmouth bass, pickerel, and Northern pike populate the waters.

Foley Mountain Conservation Area, the highest conservation area in the Rideau Valley, is a picturesque park overlooking Westport. It features a variety of wildlife in 308 hectares (2.4 km^{2}) of woods and fields. The area also has a sandy beach with changing facilities. The 300 km Rideau Trail, linking Kingston and Ottawa, passes through the conservation area.

Westport is part of PorchFest, featuring its own local festival in late September, named WestPORCH. WestPORCH is a free community festival, which began in 2021, it was created by John Pringle & Trevor Connell.

== Services ==
Westport has its own volunteer fire department. The Review Mirror, the community newspaper, is published on Thursdays. With a subscription base of only 700, it is one of Ontario's smallest weekly newspapers.

Westport has an online only community internet radio station called Rideau Lakes Radio. Established in 2022, the station broadcasts a mix of country, blues, soft rock, rock, oldies and much more.
