= Lower Beverley Lake =

Lake in Ontario, Canada

- Location within Ontario
- Location: Leeds and Grenville United Counties, Ontario
- Coordinates: 44.598°N 76.135°W
- Basin countries: Canada

Lower Beverley Lake is a lake in Leeds and Grenville United Counties, Ontario, Canada, and was included in the original survey plan for the Rideau Canal. It was struck from the final plan, and is separated from the Rideau system by a dam at Morton.

Upper and Lower Beverley Lakes were included in the original surveyed plans for the canal in the early 1800 but there would have been insufficient water to maintain the water levels in the summer and so the plans were altered.

Situated between the two lakes is the town of Delta, Ontario, named for the formation of land between the two lakes, and the historic Delta mill.
