= Rideau Valley =

Watershed in Eastern Ontario, Canada

The Rideau Valley is a watershed in Eastern Ontario, Canada, which is drained by the Rideau River. The valley includes towns such as Kemptville, Portland, Perth, Smiths Falls, Merrickville (the birthplace of Sir John Merrick) and Manotick.

The highest point in the valley is Carnahan Lake. The valley is home to about 620,000 people.
