= Rideau Lakes =

- Township (lower-tier)
- Township of Rideau Lakes
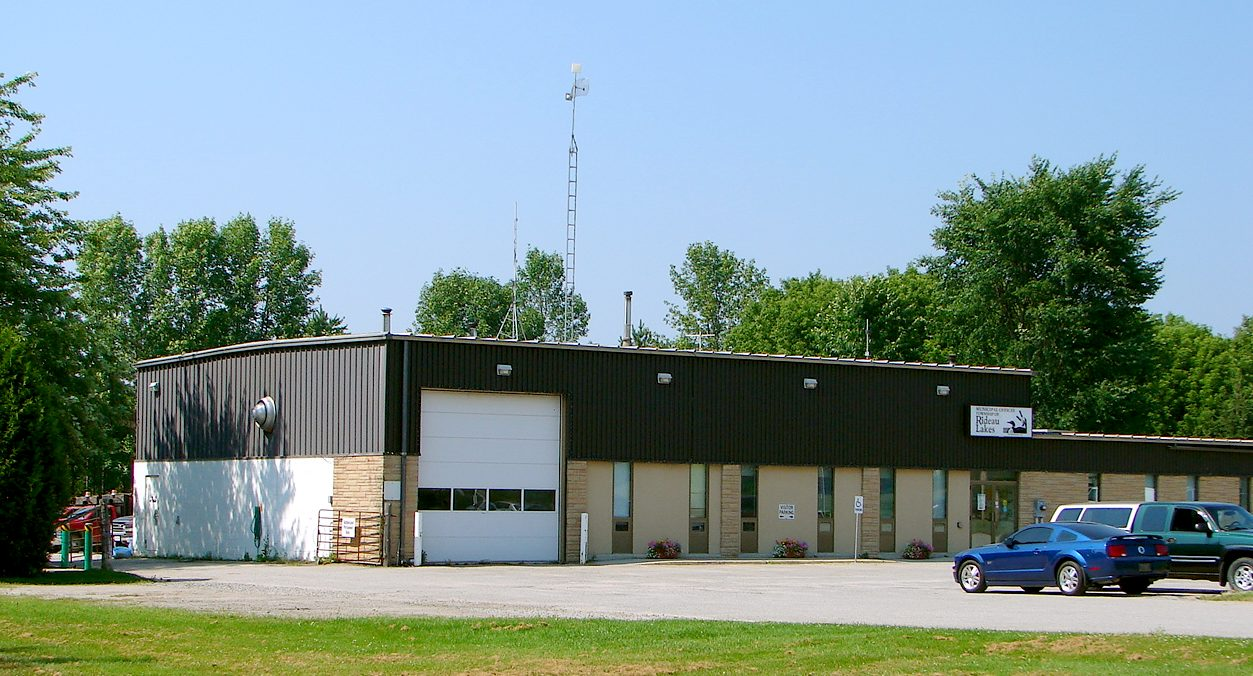
- Municipal office

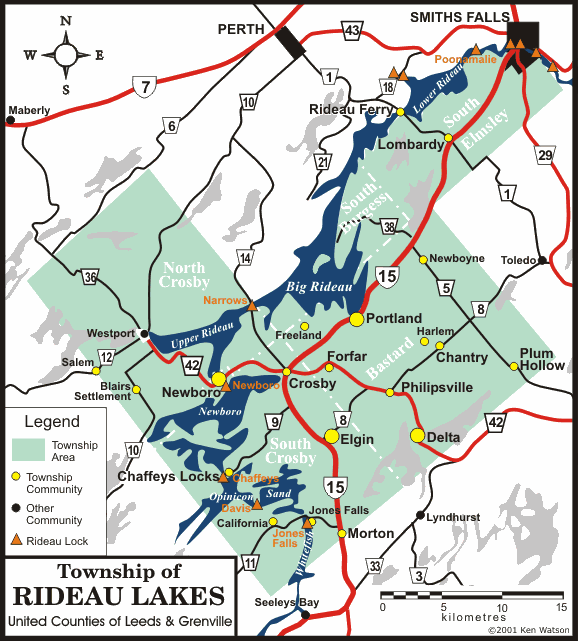

- Location within United Counties of Leeds and Grenville Location within Southern Ontario
- Coordinates: 44°40′N 76°13′W
- Country: Canada
- Province: Ontario
- County: Leeds and Grenville
- Incorporated: 1 January 1998

Government
  - Mayor: Arie Hoogenboom
  - Fed. riding: Leeds—Grenville—Thousand Islands and Rideau Lakes
  - Prov. riding: Leeds—Grenville—Thousand Islands and Rideau Lakes

Area
  - Land: 711.81 km^{2} (274.83 sq mi)

Population (2021)
  - Total: 10,883
  - Density: 15.3/km^{2} (40/sq mi)
- Time zone: UTC-5 (EST)
  - Summer (DST): UTC-4 (EDT)
- Postal Code: K0E
- Area codes: 613, 343
- Website: www.twprideaulakes.on.ca

Rideau Lakes is a township located within the United Counties of Leeds and Grenville in Eastern Ontario, Canada. Rideau Lakes lies in the northwest corner of Leeds and Grenville, and is geographically the largest municipality in the county. The township administrative offices are located in the hamlet of Chantry.

The township was incorporated on 1 January 1998 by amalgamating the former Townships of North Crosby, South Crosby, Bastard and South Burgess, and South Elmsley, as well as the Village of Newboro.

Farming, tourism, and service industries form the backbone of the local economy. The many tourist attractions in Rideau Lakes, including historic trails, the stone arch dam at Jones Falls, and the Rideau Canal, are also an important part of the township's economy. The region is referred to as a cottage country due to its waterfront forested landscapes.

Rideau Lakes has 500 km (310 mi) of shoreline, excluding the Rideau Waterway. The waterway itself traverses the township, from the towering granite cliffs near Chaffeys Lock to the more gentle and pastoral areas of the Lower Rideau Lake.

== Communities ==
Rideau Lakes contains many villages and hamlets, spread across four electoral wards, including:

=== Ward 1: Bastard and South Burgess ===
- Chantry
- Delta
- Chaffeys Lock
- Daytown
- Forfar
- Freeland
- Harlem
- Newboyne
- Philipsville
- Plum Hollow
- Portland
- Scotch Point

=== Ward 2: South Elmsley ===
- Lombardy
- Rideau Ferry

=== Ward 3: South Crosby ===
- Chaffeys Lock
- Crosby
- Elgin
- Jones Falls
- Morton

=== Ward 4: North Crosby and Newboro ===
- Blairs Settlement
- Newboro
- Salem

The independent village of Westport is entirely surrounded by Rideau Lakes, but is not part of the township.

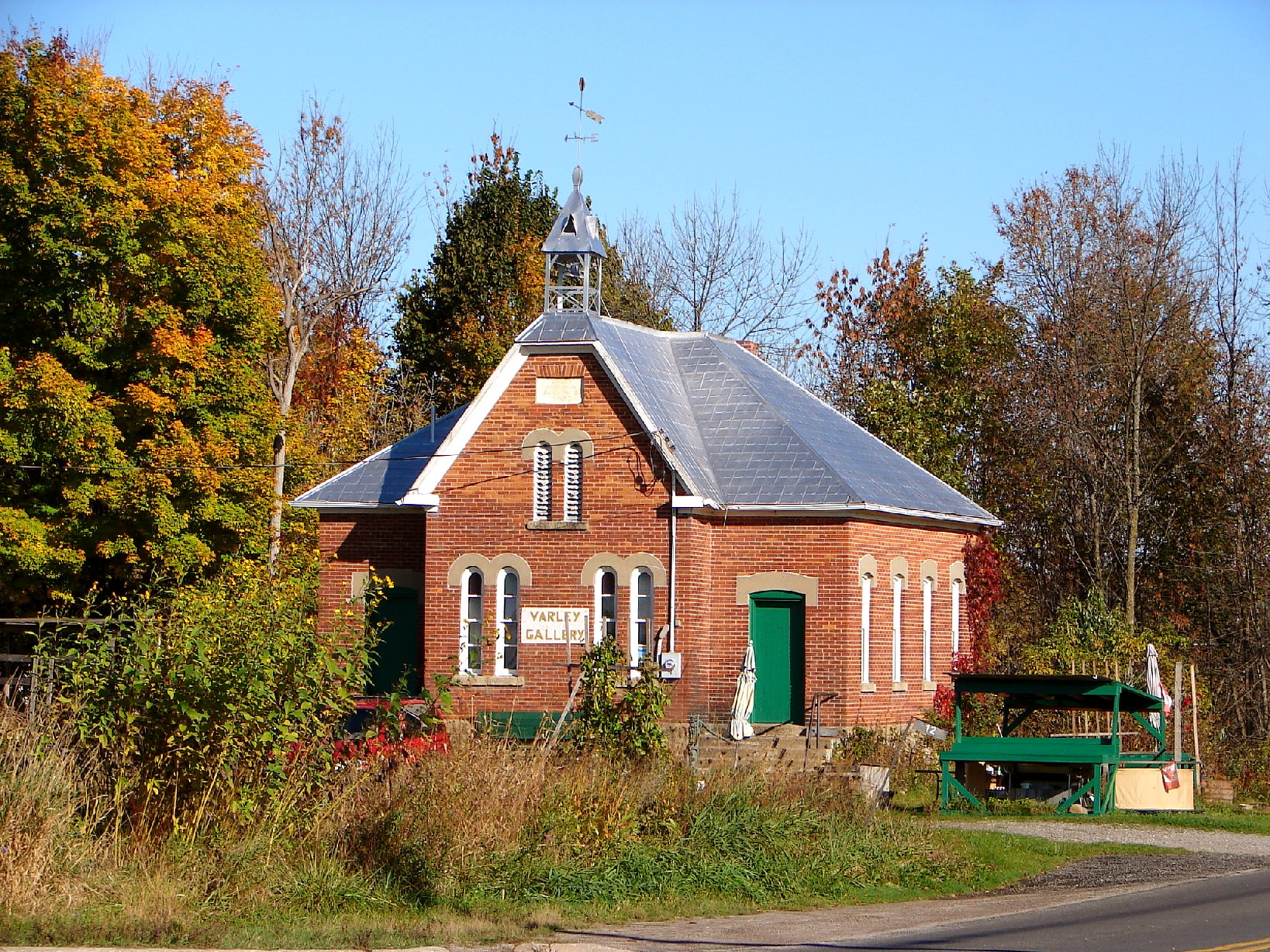
Old school building in Crosby

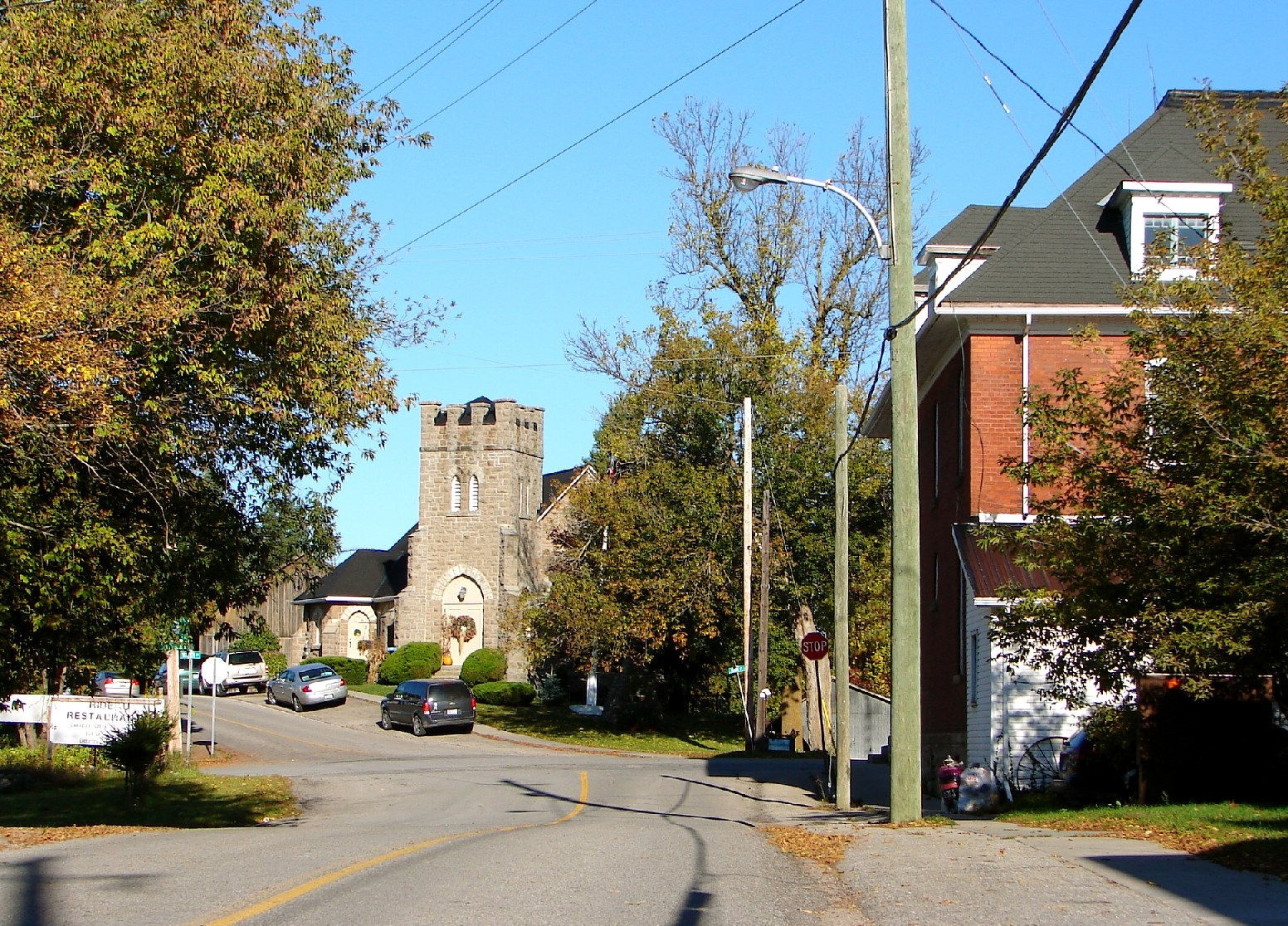
Elgin

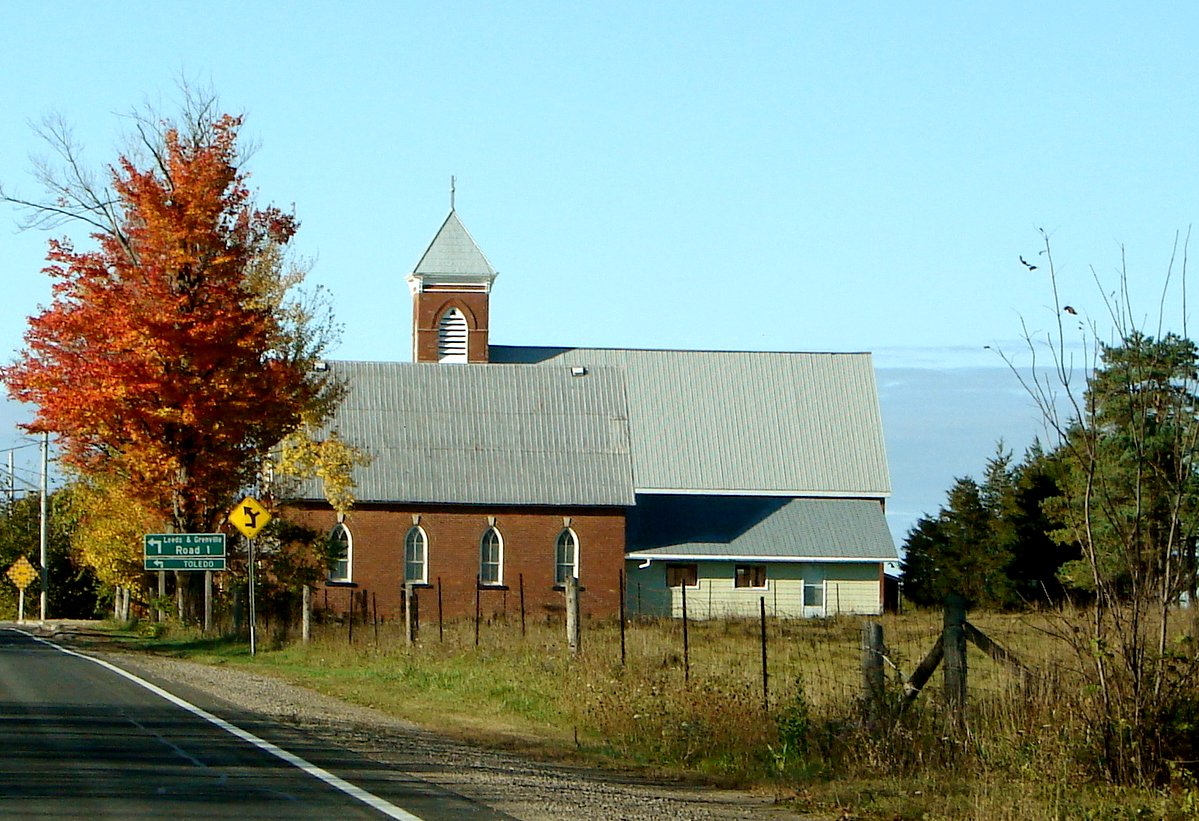
Lombardy

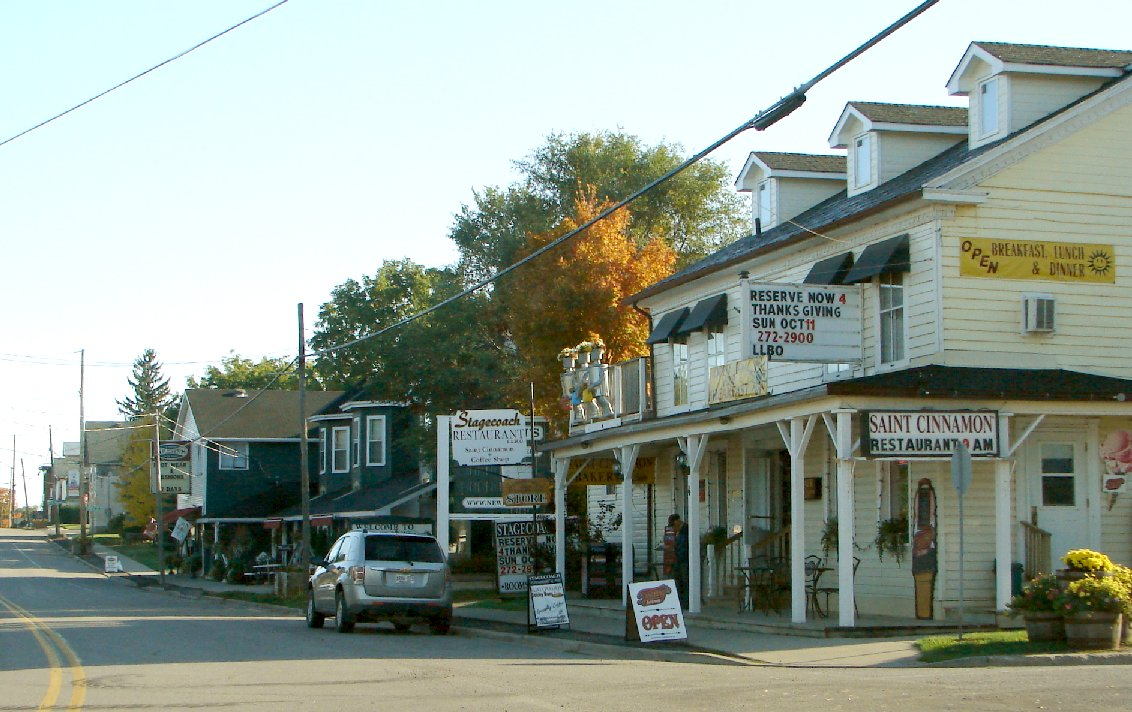
Newboro

=== Newboro ===
A plaque was erected by the Ontario Heritage Foundation commemorating the founding of Newboro with the building of the Rideau Canal in 1826–32. Benjamin Tett settled here in 1833. He opened a store and later a post office. The community served as a major construction camp during the building of the Rideau Canal. Newboro was a trade centre for the region's lumbering industry and agriculture. The economic development of the community was enabled by the shipment of iron ore from local mines via the Rideau canal to smelters in Pittsburgh and Cleveland during the latter part of the 19th century. The Village of Newboro was incorporated in 1876.

=== Chaffey's Lock ===
A plaque was erected by the Ontario Heritage Foundation commemorating the founding of Chaffey's Lock by Benjamin and Samuel Chaffey, who established mills here in 1820. Samuel Chaffey settling here shortly thereafter. The site included a distillery and saw, grist, carding, and fulling mills by 1827. The mills were flooded by the building of the Rideau Canal. A plaque was erected by the Chaffey's Lock and Area Heritage Society commemorating the founders, early builders, and all who have been part of the Chaffey's Lock community. Plaques have been erected by individuals and families on the Memory Wall, at Chaffey's Lock Cemetery.

The Queen's University Biological Station is located just southwest of Chaffey's Lock.

== Demographics ==
In the 2021 Census of Population conducted by Statistics Canada, Rideau Lakes had a population of 10,883 living in 4,696 of its 6,781 total private dwellings, a change of 5.4% from its 2016 population of 10,326. With a land area of 711.81 km^{2} (274.83 sq mi), it had a population density of 15.3/km^{2} (39.6/sq mi) in 2021.

Canada census – Rideau Lakes community profile

	2021	2016	2011
Population	10,883 (+5.4% from 2016)	10,326 (+1.2% from 2011)	10,207 (-1.4% from 2006)
Land area	711.81 km^{2} (274.83 sq mi)	729.22 km^{2} (281.55 sq mi)	729.09 km^{2} (281.50 sq mi)
Population density	15.3/km^{2} (40/sq mi)	14.2/km^{2} (37/sq mi)	14.0/km^{2} (36/sq mi)
Median age	55.6 (M: 55.2, F: 55.6)	54.0 (M: 53.7, F: 54.2)
Private dwellings	6,781 (total) 4,696 (occupied)	6,891 (total) 4,423 (occupied)	6258 (total)
Median household income	$84,000	$71,801

References: 2021 2016 2011

Historical census populations – Rideau Lakes
Year	Pop.	±%
2001	9,687	—
2006	10,350	+6.8%
2011	10,207	−1.4%
2016	10,326	+1.2%
2021	10,883	+5.4%
Source: Statistics Canada

- Population in 1996:
  - Bastard and South Burgess Township: 2692
  - Newboro Village: 291
  - North Crosby Township: 1097
  - South Crosby Township: 1910
  - South Elmsley Township: 3574
- Population in 1991:
  - Bastard and South Burgess Township: 2610
  - Newboro Village: 282
  - North Crosby Township: 968
  - South Crosby Township: 1677
  - South Elmsley Township: 3065

Mother tongue (2021):

- English as first language: 94.1%
- French as first language: 2.3%
- English and French as first language: 0.5%
- Other as first language: 2.9%

== Tourism and attractions ==
The Rideau Trail, a 300-kilometre (190 mi) footpath from Kingston to Ottawa, passes through the township. The highest point on the trail is located in the Foley Mountain Conservation Area, which is located within the township. The Cataraqui Trail, a rail trail on a former Canadian National right-of-way, goes through the township, passing near Portland, Elgin, and Chaffey's Lock. The Old Stone Mill National Historic Site is located within the village of Delta.

Trout island is a double island on the Rideau lakes; it became famous for its great trout fishing. There are three cottages on the island.

== See also ==
- Hotel Kenney
- List of municipalities in Ontario
- List of townships in Ontario
