= Cyclorama of Jerusalem =

Cyclorama by Paul Philippoteaux

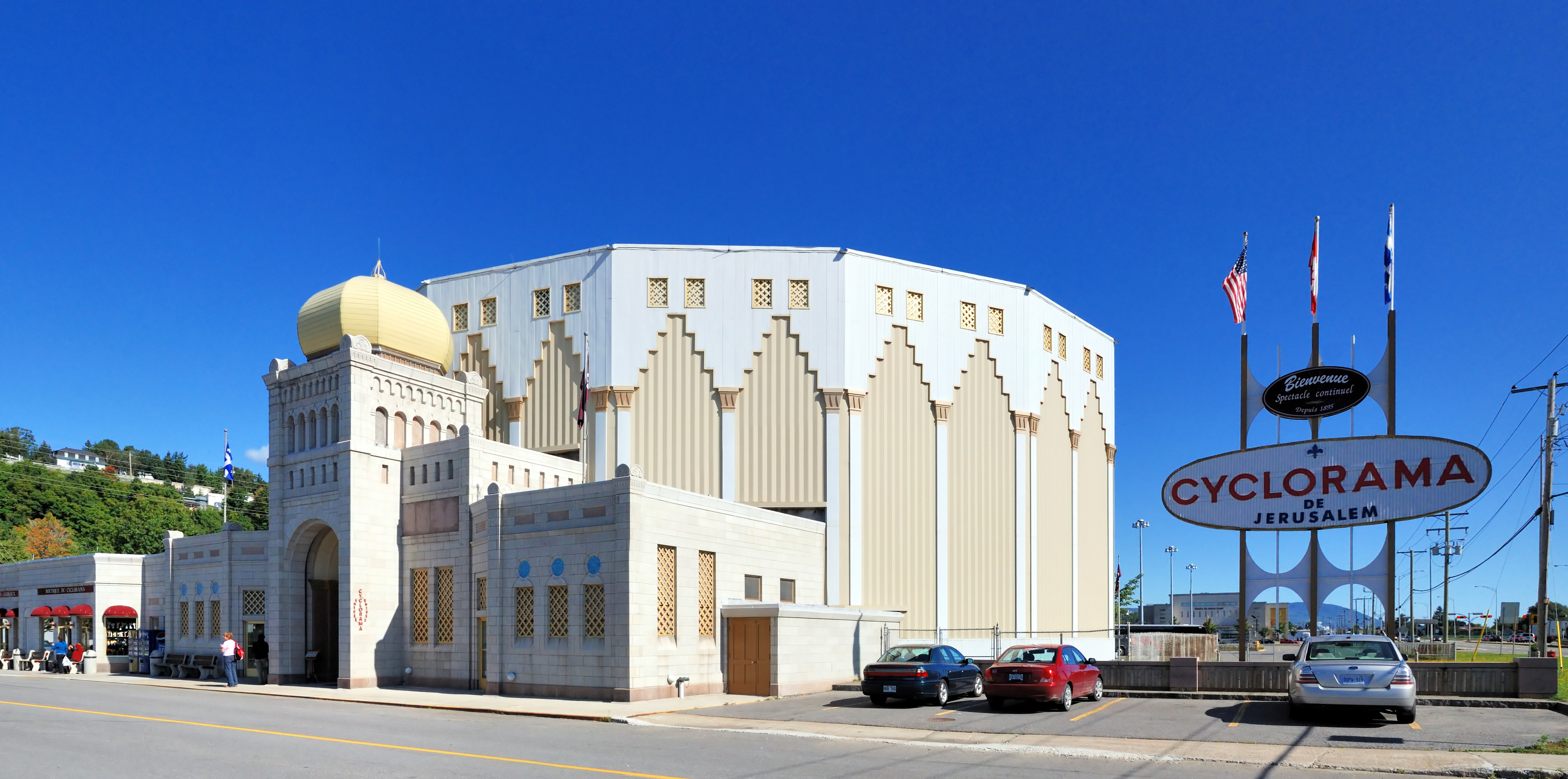
Cyclorama of Jerusalem

The Cyclorama of Jerusalem is located in Sainte-Anne-de-Beaupré, Quebec, near the Basilica of Sainte-Anne-de-Beaupré. It is a cyclorama, a circular painting, of the Crucifixion of Jesus, showing what the city of Jerusalem might have looked like at the time of his death.

== History ==
The cyclorama has been on display since 1895. It was painted by Paul Philippoteaux, the panoramist from Paris, assisted by five other painters: Salvador Mège (1854–1915) and Ernest Gros, of Paris, Charles Abel Corwin and Oliver Dennett Grover, of Chicago and Edward James Austen (1850–1930), of London.

The Cyclorama is one of the world's largest. It measures 14 by 110 metres (46 ft × 361 ft). Among the scenes are: The South Section of Jerusalem and the Tomb of Absalom.

The Cyclorama was declared as a bien patrimonial (heritage property/item) by the government of Quebec in August 2017. The family that owned the Cyclorama had been trying to sell it; the designation doesn't prevent the sale but gives the government the right of first refusal in the event of a sale.

The Cyclorama closed its doors in October 2018 after 123 years in operation, having not found a buyer. The diorama and building housing it remained on sale at that time, pending new owners to move or reopen it.

== In popular culture ==
The Cyclorama appears in the 2022 film You Can Live Forever.
