= Convent of the Redemptoristines =

Convent in Québec, Canada

- Couvent des Rédemptoristines
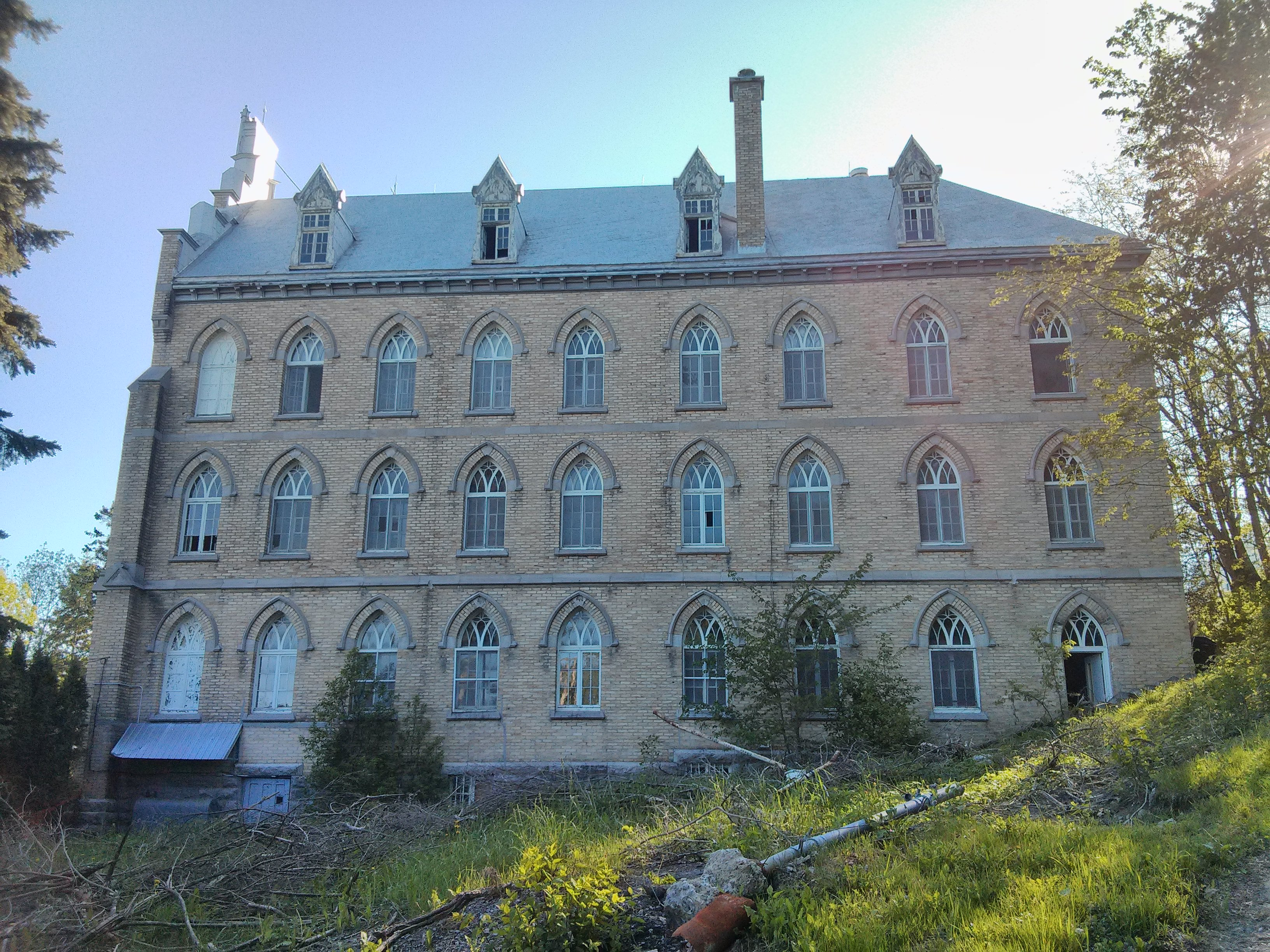

- Location within Central Quebec

Religion
- Affiliation: Roman Catholic
- Province: Québec
- Ecclesiastical or organizational status: convent
- Year consecrated: 1907
- Status: abandoned

Location
- Municipality: Sainte-Anne-de-Beaupré
- Country: Canada
- Interactive map of Convent of the Redemptoristines
- Coordinates: 47.025296°N 70.929348°W

Architecture
- Architect: Georges-Emile Tanguay
- Style: Gothic Revival architecture
- General contractor: Morissette et Côté
- Groundbreaking: 1905
- Completed: 1907
- Materials: brick
- Patrimoine culturel du Québec
- Official name: Couvent des Rédemptoristines
- Designated: 2001
- Reference no.: 8687

The Convent of the Redemptoristines (French: Couvent des Rédemptoristines) is a convent in Sainte-Anne-de-Beaupré, Québec, Canada, that once was home to nuns of the Redemptoristines order. Owing to its Gothic Revival architecture and importance in the region's religious history, it was added to the Cultural heritage register of Quebec in 2001. A decline in religious vocations resulted in a loss of numbers, and remaining elderly nuns moved to another site in the 1990s. The property was essentially abandoned after being used temporarily for other operations.

In 2015, the building was purchased by a real-estate developer and in 2018, converted into apartment type housing.

== History ==
The first Redemptoristine nuns arrived in the city in 1905. Some months later, the foundation for the convent was started. Completed in 1907, the large, three-story convent was home to Redemptoristine nuns into the 1990s. With changes in vocations, the number of nuns declined in the order. The needs of old age forced the remaining nuns to relocate to Sainte-Thérèse north of Montreal. For a short while after, the convent was occupied by Assumptionists. Following a string of other tenants, the convent was indefinitely abandoned in 2014.

Because of its importance in the region's religious history and its architecture, the convent was declared a heritage site in 2001. Of neo-gothical inspiration, the building is three stories high and is located on a hill dominating the nearby Basilica of Sainte-Anne-de-Beaupré. Composed of three wings arranged in a U-shape and constructed using yellow bricks, the architecture of the building is highly imposing and institutional, as was common during that period.

== Current status ==
In 2014, the owners of the convent, the Redemptorists, could no longer afford the high upkeep costs of the building and decided to cut the heating. They maintained only the exterior, and let the building fall in disrepair.

After a 2015 purchase by a real-estate developer failed to convert it to a funeral home, another developer has converted the west-side wing into rental apartments, and has planned to do the same to the east-side wing, and also to convert the chapel into a single, four-floor, residence, with a final goal of twenty-four homes in the building.

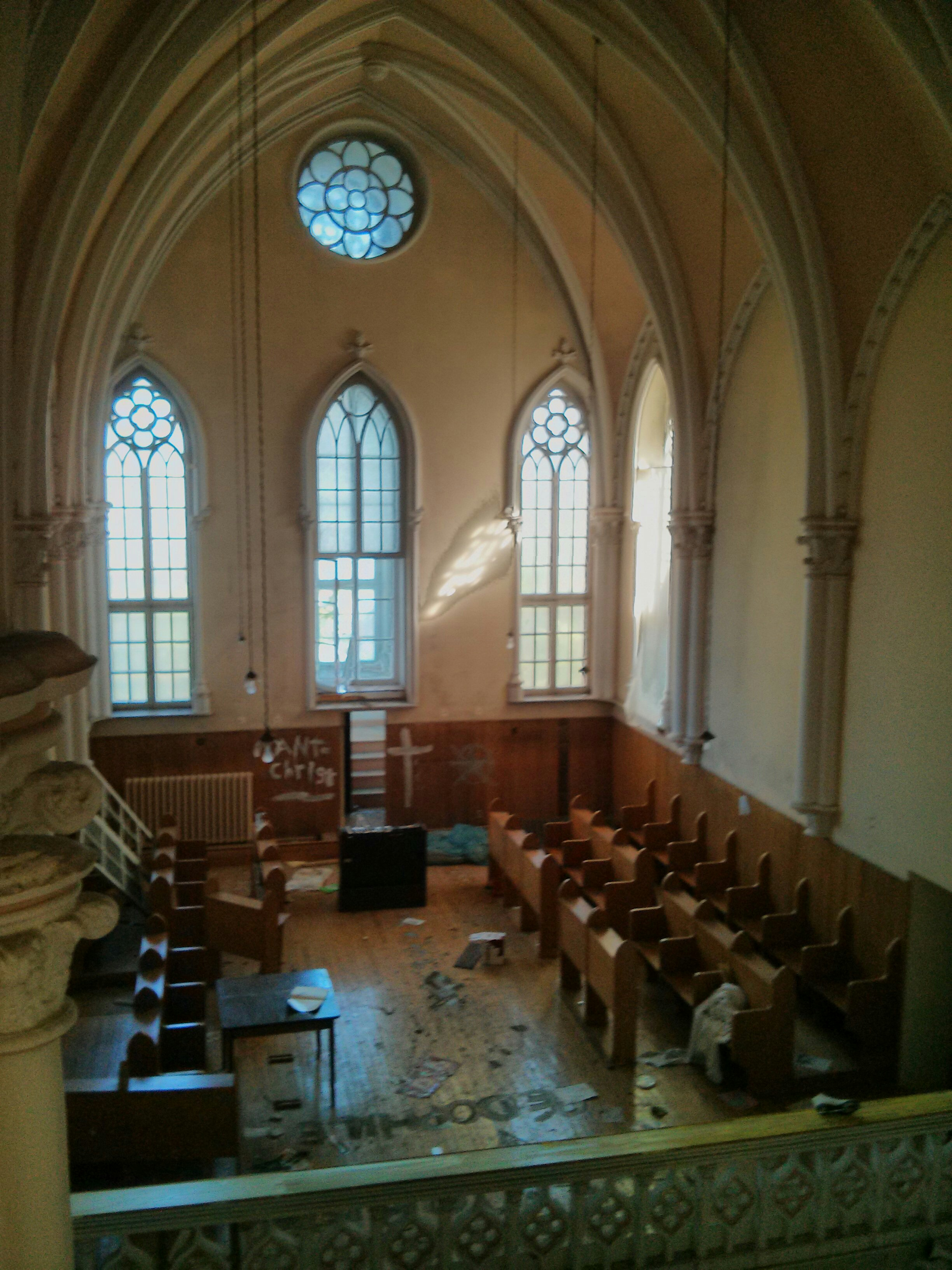
The chapel

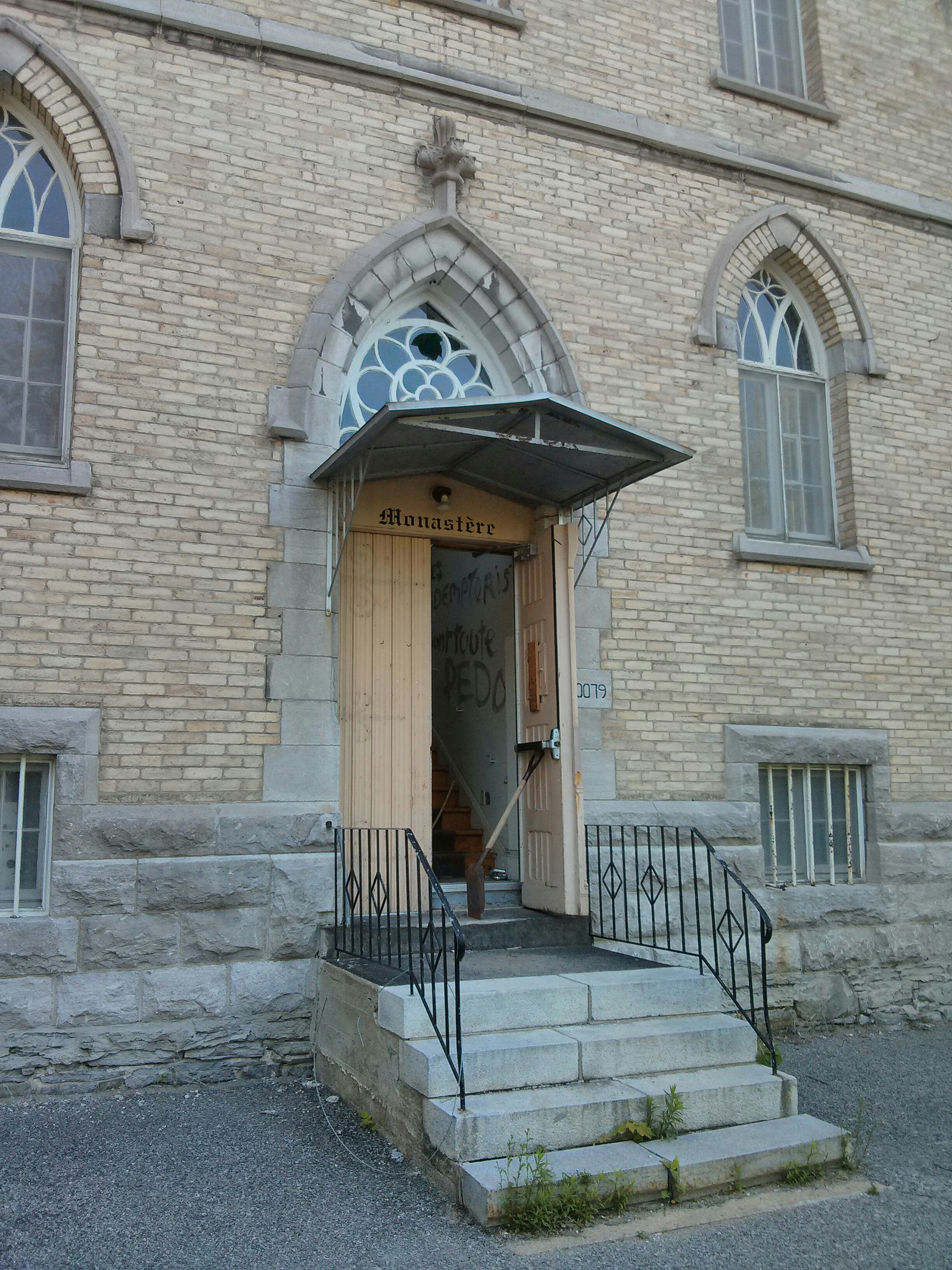
The entrance

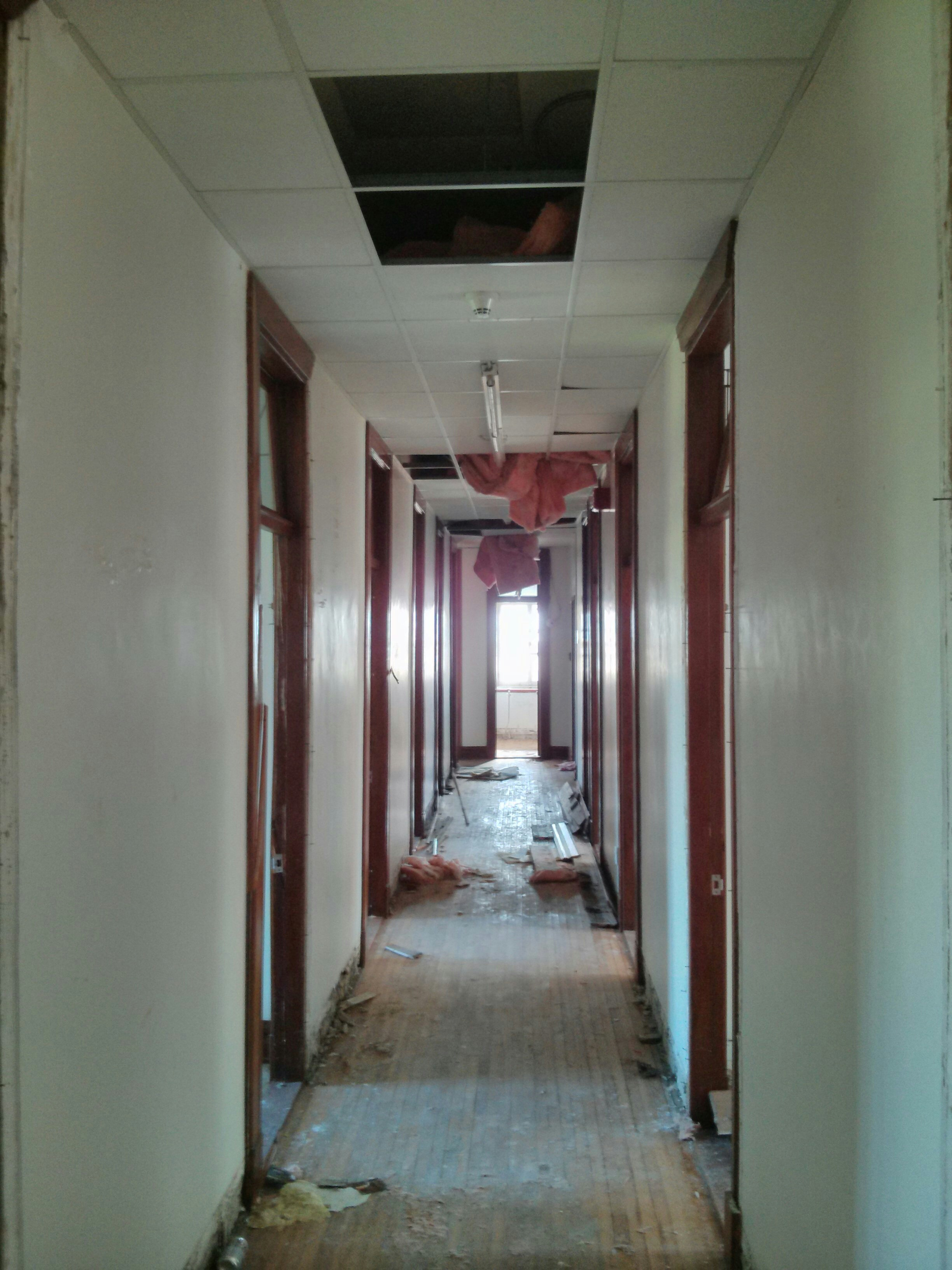
A hallway
