= Joseph-Émile Brunet =

Canadian sculptor

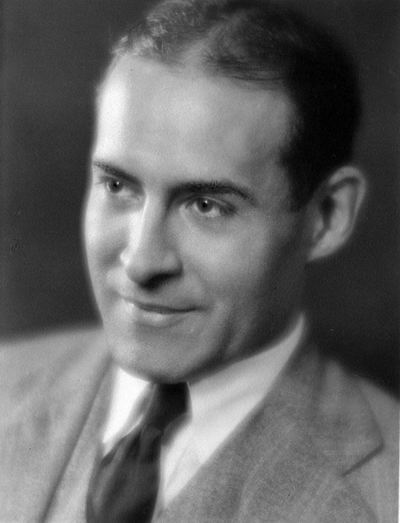
- Born: 1893; Huntingdon, Quebec
- Died: 1977 (aged 83–84)
- Resting place: Notre Dame des Neiges Cemetery
- Education: archbishop school, the Art Institute of Chicago, and the École des Beaux-Arts School of Paris.
- Known for: sculptor
- Movement: art deco

Joseph-Émile Brunet (1893–1977) was a Canadian sculptor based in Quebec. His output includes more than 200 monuments in bronze. Many of his sculptures depict national figures and events in Canada. He was born in Huntingdon, Quebec in 1893. He was educated at archbishop school, the Art Institute of Chicago, and the national superior École des Beaux-Arts of Paris.

== Works ==
Joseph-Émile Brunet sculpted the bas reliefs and ornamental façade of the Gérard-Morisset building, Musée national des beaux-arts du Québec in Quebec City which depict historical scenes and events in Canadian History: "Fishing", "Fur Trading", "Maple Sugar Making", "Farming", "Logging", "Missionaries", "Landing Immigrates", "Buffalo Hunt"," Jacques Cartier"," Death of Wolfe"," Death of Montcalm","William Dollard", "Pierre Gaultier de Varennes, sieur de La Vérendrye" and "The First Settlers".

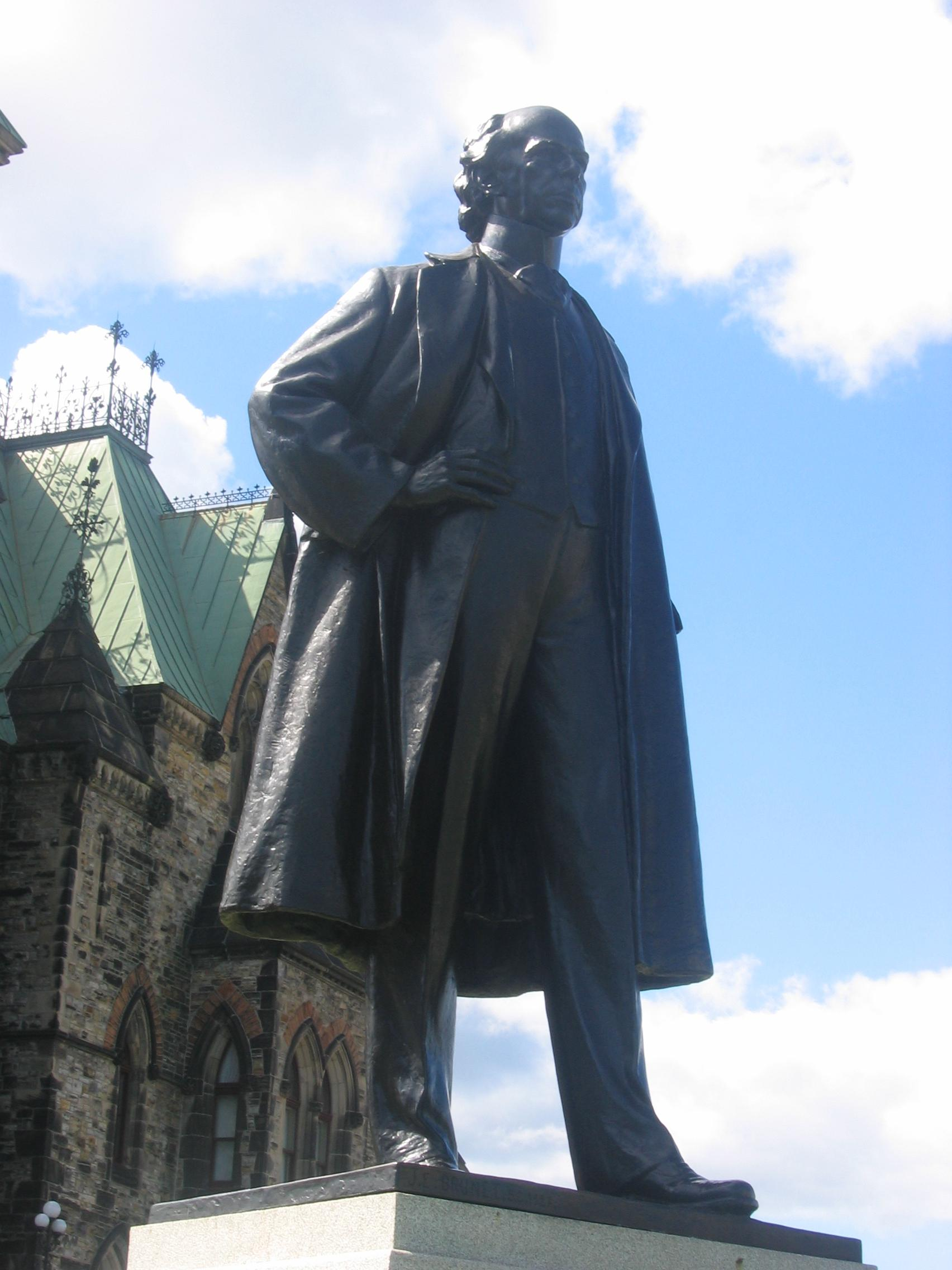
Joseph-Émile Brunet's Sir Wilfrid Laurier, Parliament Hill in Ottawa, Ontario

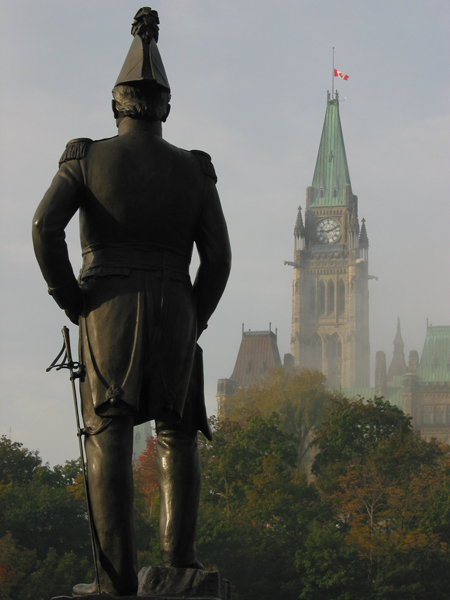
Joseph-Émile Brunet's John By (1971) Major's Hill Park in Ottawa, Ontario

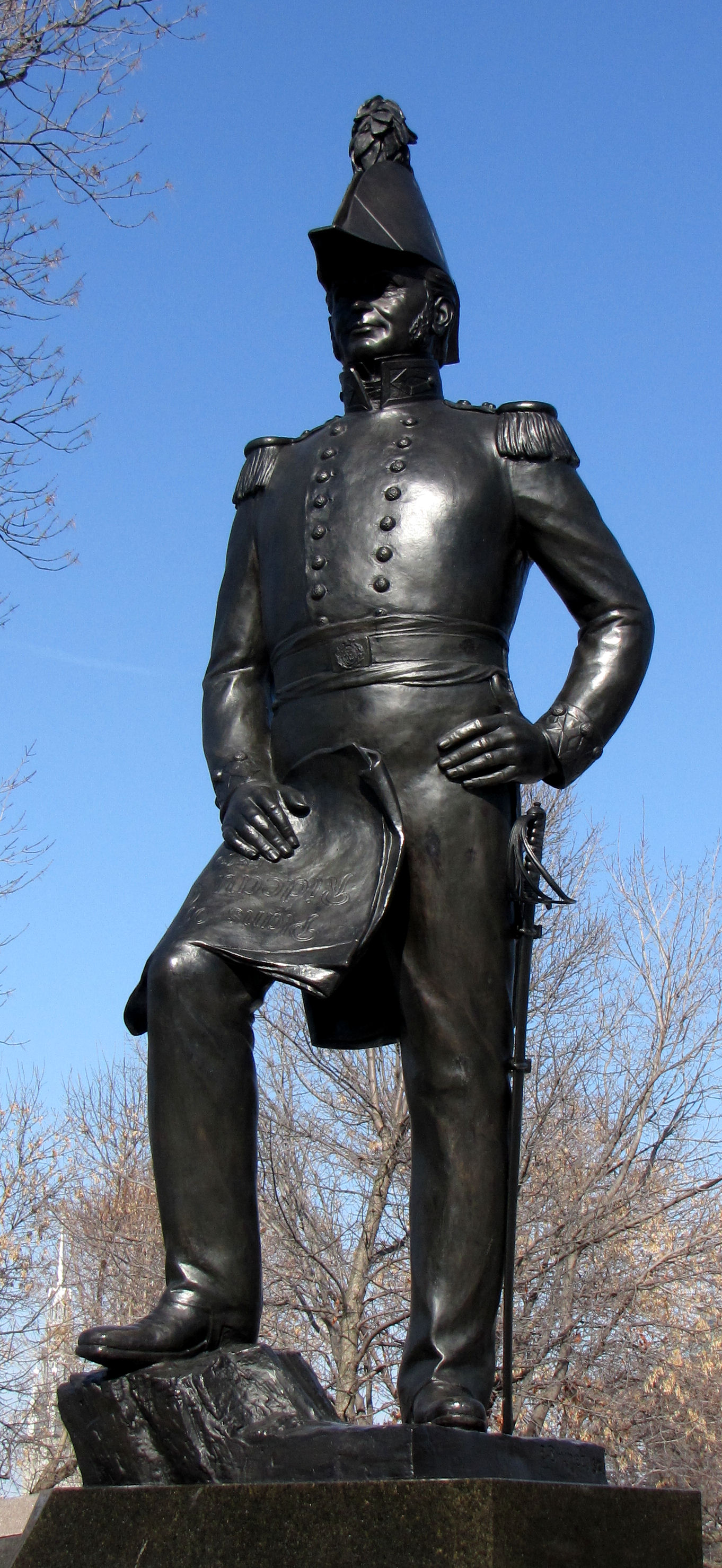
Joseph-Émile Brunet's John By (1971) Major's Hill Park in Ottawa, Ontario

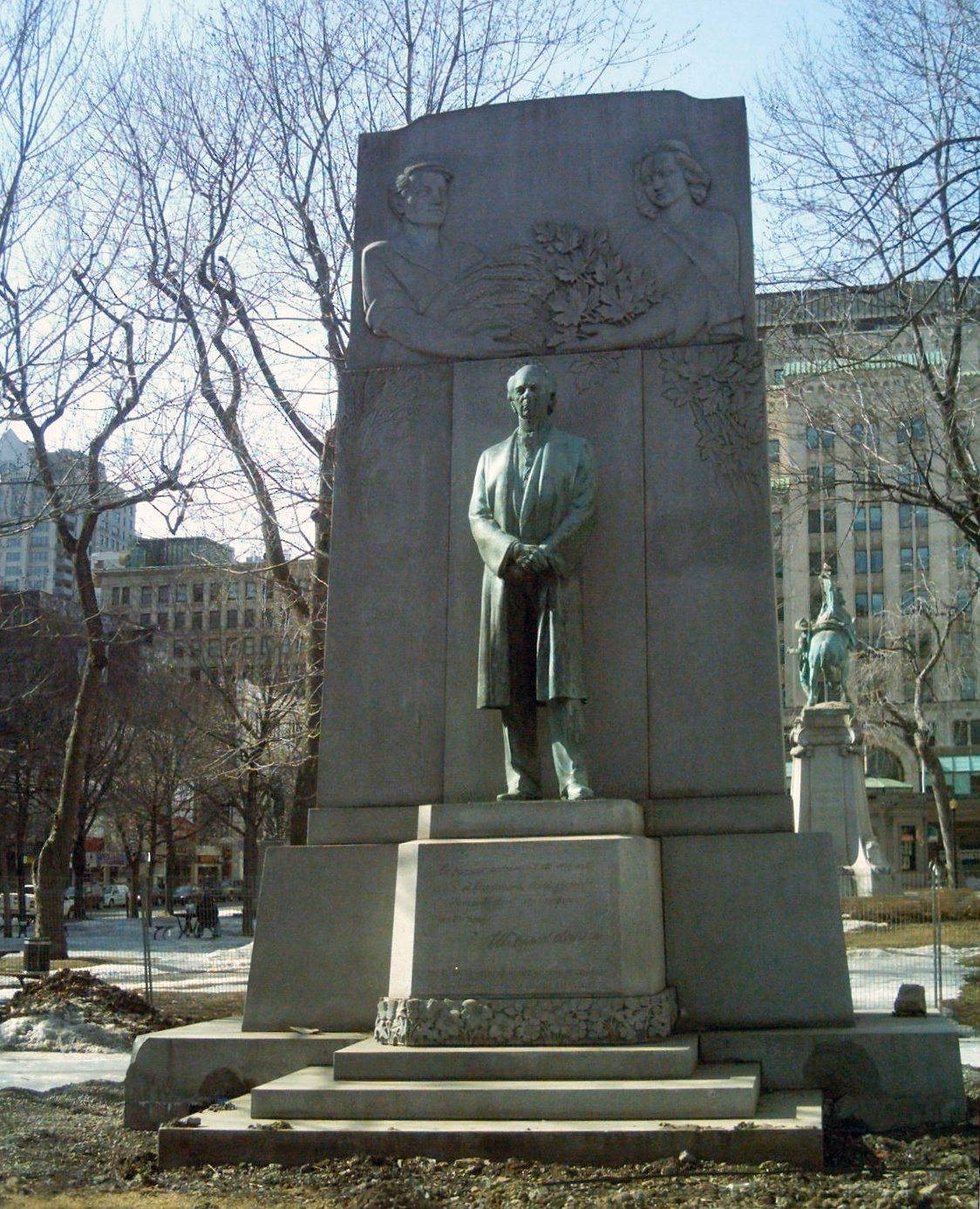
Joseph-Émile Brunet's Sir Wilfrid Laurier (1953) in Square Dorchester Montreal, Quebec

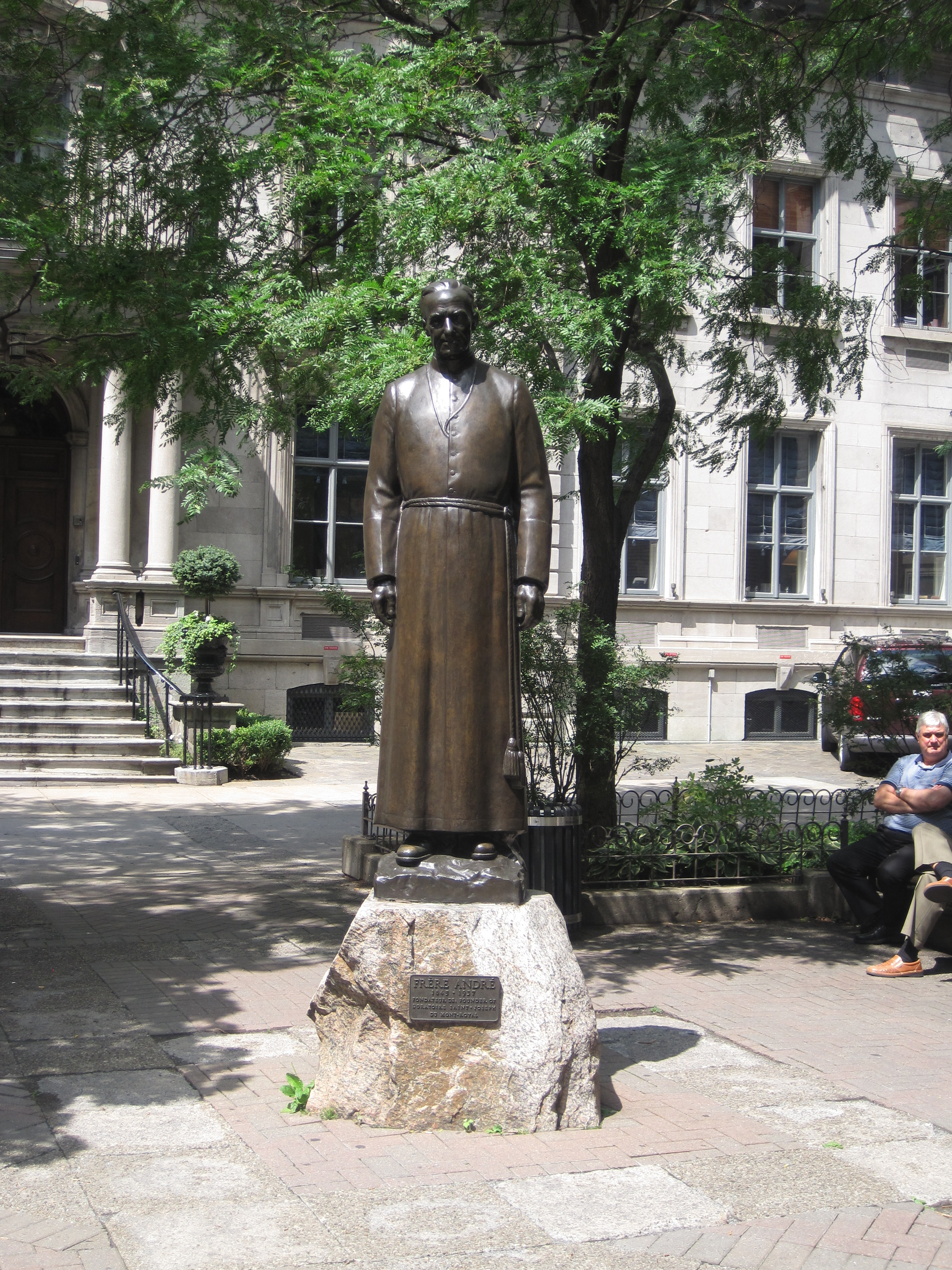
Joseph-Émile Brunet's Statue du Frère André à la Place du Frère-André, Montreal, Quebec

He was granted commissions for granite sculptures of key figures in the province of Quebec's history at the Parliament Building (Quebec): "François de Laval", "Marguerite Bourgeoys", "Jean-Jacques Olier" and "Marie de l’Incarnation" completing the façade by 1965. He was also granted commission for two large bronze doors depicting animals native to Canada: "The Young Bear" and Cubs," "Canadian Moose", "Otters", "Elk with wolves", "Polar bear", "Beavers", American Bison", "Deer" and a "Great white Whale".

He sculpted a bronze War Memorial at Longueuil, Quebec (1924) in front of the city hall just across the river from Montreal.

He sculpted a statue of Pierre Gaultier de Varennes, sieur de La Vérendrye in Saint Boniface, Manitoba.

He sculpted the Canadian Pavilion for the Exposition Internationale des Arts et Techniques dans la Vie Moderne in Paris which included a 28 foot (8.5 m) sculpture of a bison (1937) and panels on the outside of the structure. Paintings and a show inside the Canadian pavilion depicted aspects of Canadian culture. Mr. Joseph-Émile Brunet designed twenty-four capitals (1948) for the Basilica of Sainte-Anne-de-Beaupré, which depict 52 religious subjects reflecting the life of Jesus. Joseph-Émile Brunet sculpted 14 "Stations of the Cross" lining the walls of the cathedral. Stone statues of Saint Anne and Saints at the entrance of the cathedral. Joseph-Émile Brunet created the fountain in front of the Basilica and the stone 7 feet 6 inches (229 cm) high sculptures in niches as you enter the basilica, "Marie de L’Incarnation", "Saint Joseph", "The Virgin with Jesus", "François de Laval", and "St. Joachim". Joseph-Émile Brunet also sculpted St. Kateri Tekakwitha in bronze, 6 feet 4 inches (193 cm) high.

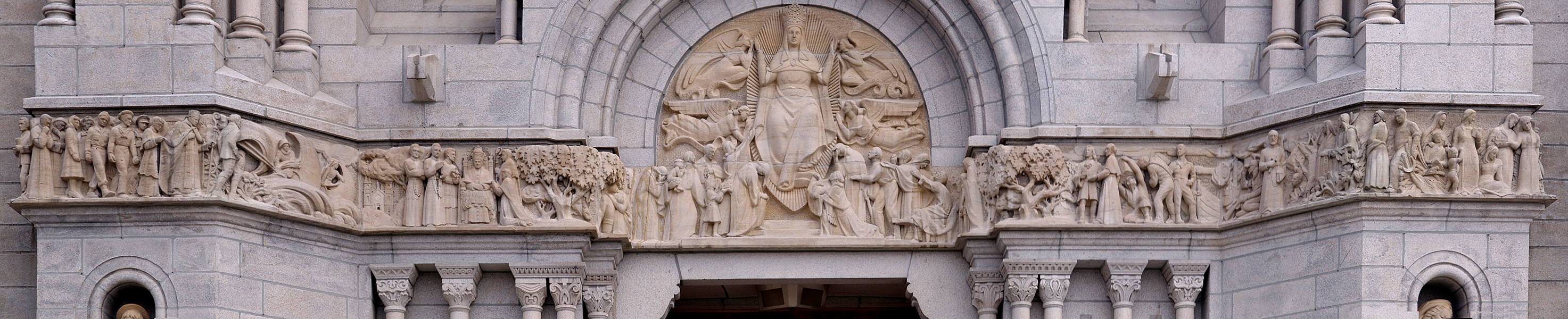
Joseph-Émile Brunet's bas relief Basilica of Sainte-Anne-de-Beaupré

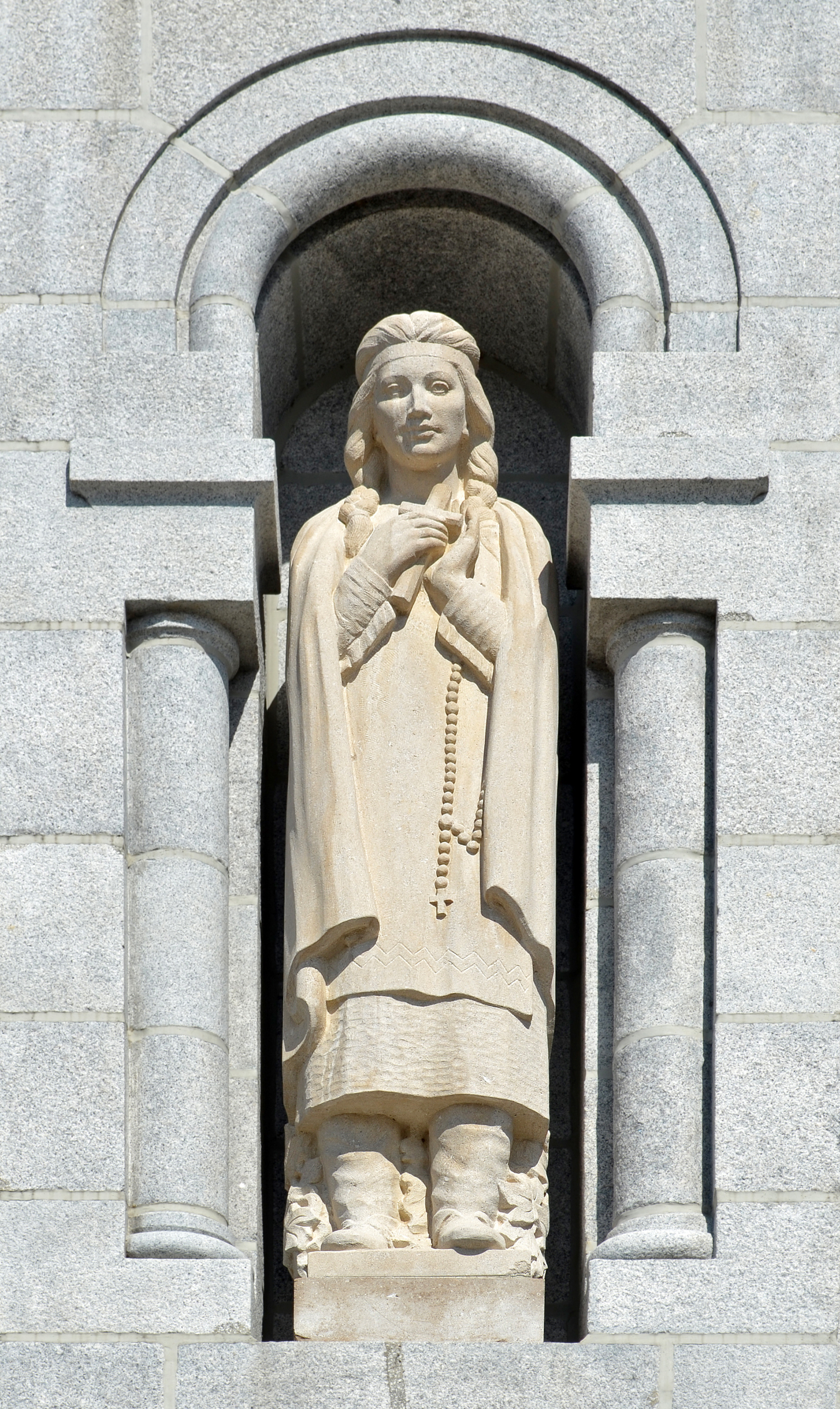
Joseph-Émile Brunet's "Kateri Tekakwitha" Basilica of Sainte-Anne-de-Beaupré

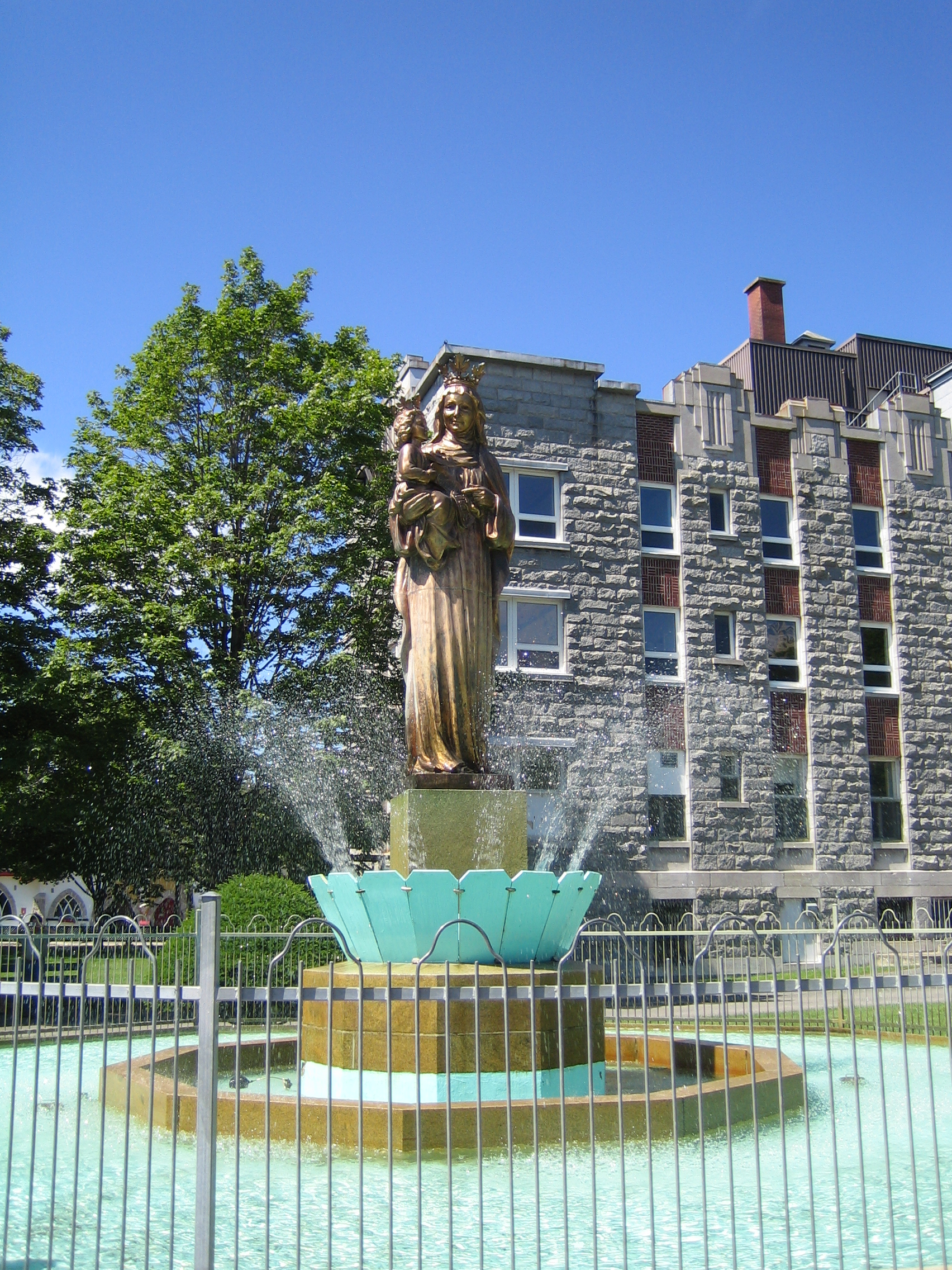
Joseph-Émile Brunet's "Mary and Jesus" Basilica of Sainte-Anne-de-Beaupré

He sculpted a bust of Adélard Godbout which was installed in Montreal, Quebec.

After his death in 1977, he was entombed at the Notre Dame des Neiges Cemetery in Montreal.
