= Sainte-Anne-de-Beaupré =

- City
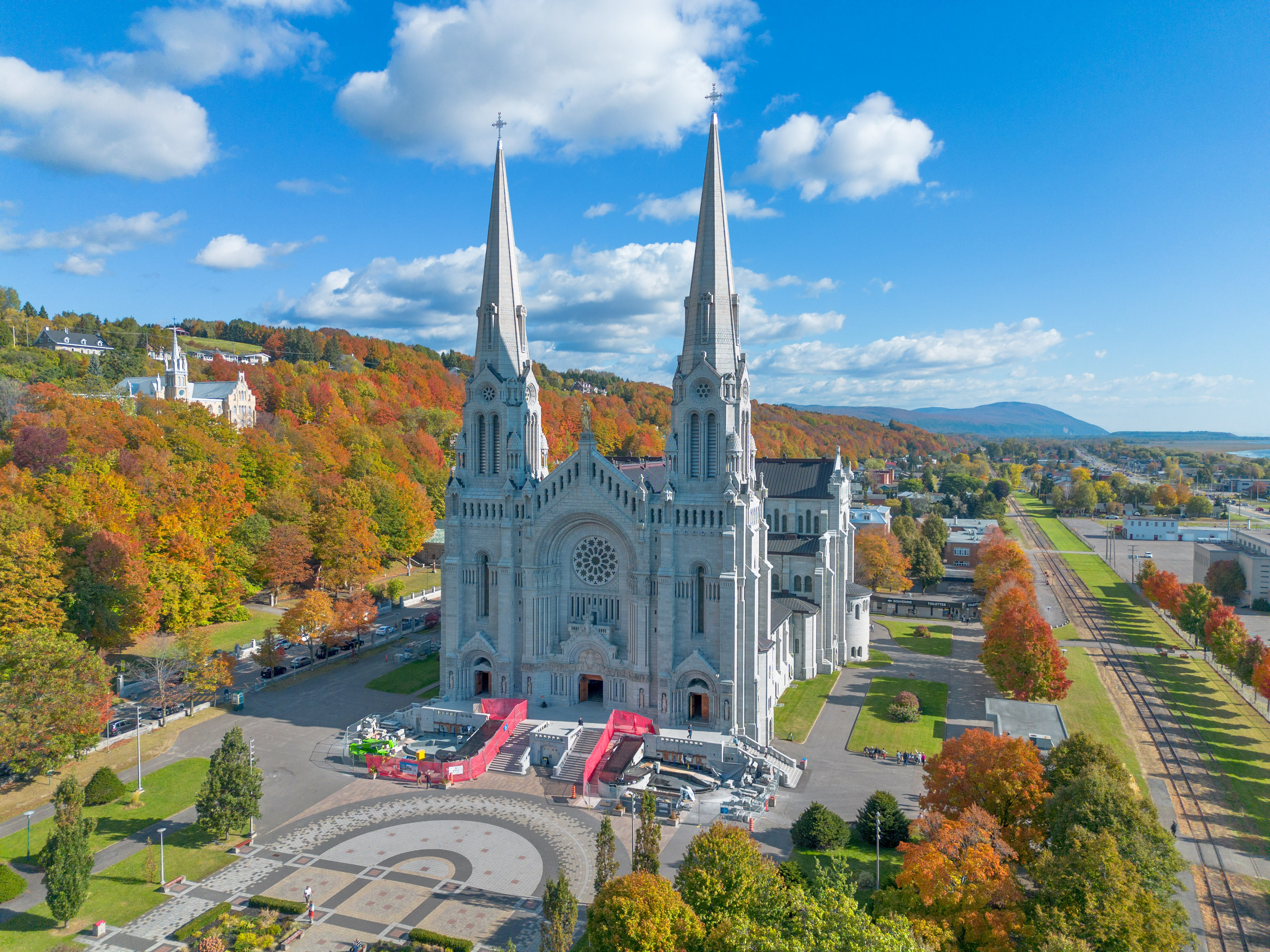
- Basilica of Sainte-Anne-de-Beaupré in 2025

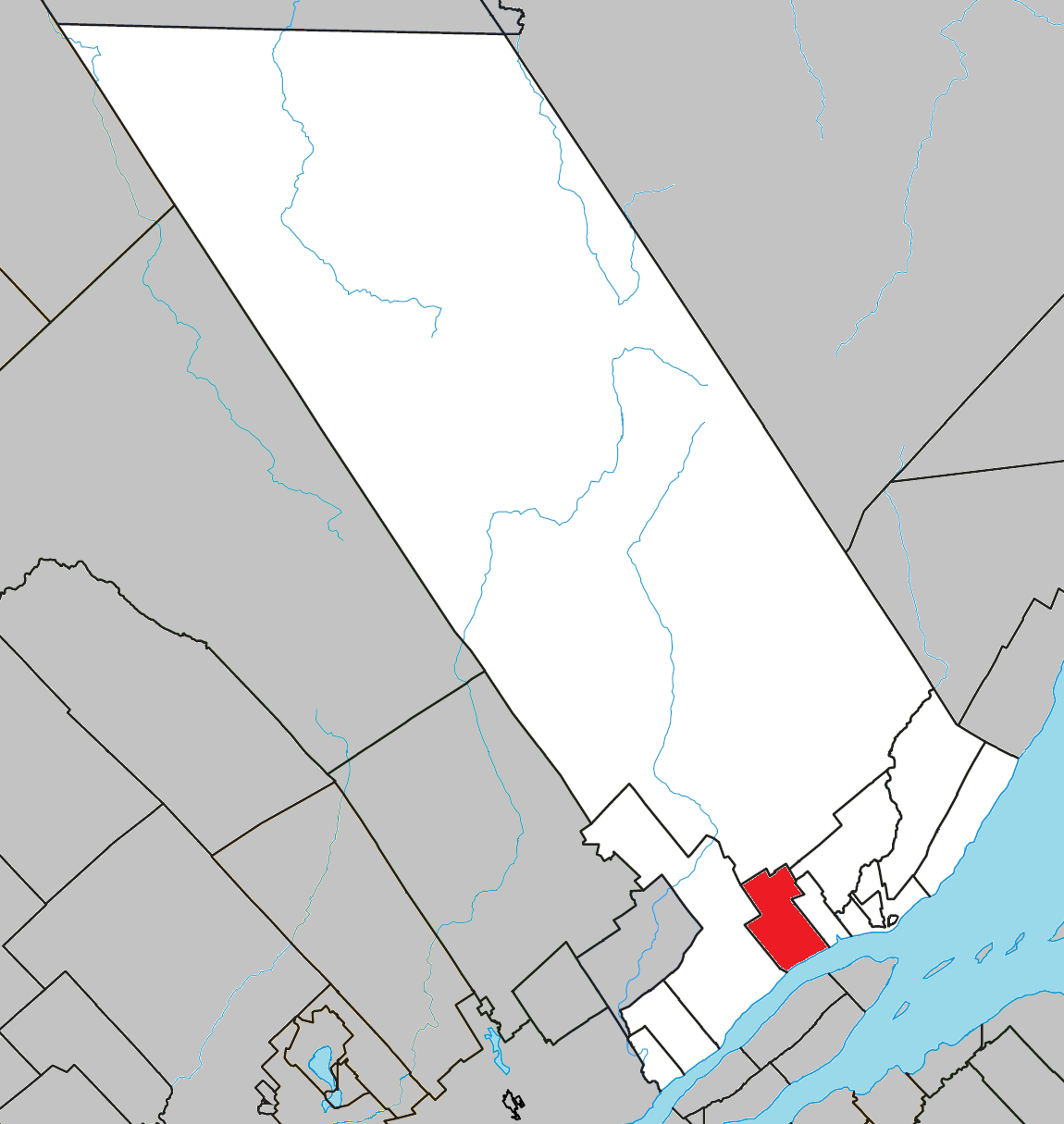
- Location within La Côte-de-Beaupré RCM

- Location in central Quebec
- Coordinates: 47°01′N 70°56′W
- Country: Canada
- Province: Quebec
- Region: Capitale-Nationale
- RCM: La Côte-de-Beaupré
- Constituted: January 27, 1973

Government
  - Mayor: Jacques Bouchard
  - Fed. riding: Montmorency—Charlevoix
  - Prov. riding: Charlevoix–Côte-de-Beaupré

Area
  - Total: 68.45 km^{2} (26.43 sq mi)
  - Land: 62.38 km^{2} (24.09 sq mi)

Population (2021)
  - Total: 2,888
  - Density: 46.3/km^{2} (120/sq mi)
  - Pop (2016-21): ▲0.3%
  - Dwellings: 1,499
- Time zone: UTC−5 (EST)
  - Summer (DST): UTC−4 (EDT)
- Postal code(s): G0A
- Area codes: 418 and 581
- Highways: R-138 R-360
- Website: www.sainteannedebeaupre.com

Sainte-Anne-de-Beaupré (French pronunciation: [sɛ̃.t‿an də bo.pʁe]) is a town in La Côte-de-Beaupré Regional County Municipality, Quebec, Canada, along the Saint Lawrence River, 35 kilometers (22 mi) north-east of Quebec City. The population was 2,803 according to the Canada 2006 Census. Major religious landmarks, the Basilica of Sainte-Anne-de-Beaupré and the Convent of the Redemptoristines, are located in the town. The basilica continues to attract pilgrims.

Sainte-Anne-de-Beaupré stands in a rolling agricultural country, with the foothills of the Laurentian Mountains in the background. The first church was built by sailors, seeking protection against shipwrecks off Ile-Oeuf on their way upriver to Quebec City. Saint Anne is the patron saint of sailors.

== History ==
Breton sailors originally established a shrine there dedicated to Saint Anne. The Sainte-Anne Parish was founded in 1657, which was also called Sainte-Anne-du-Petit-Cap (used until early 19th century) and Sainte-Anne-de-Beaupré (which was first used in 1742). Its first chapel was built in 1658.

In July 1845, the Parish Municipality of Sainte-Anne-de-Beaupré was formed, abolished in 1847, and reestablished in 1855. But it was dissolved again in May 1906, when the Village Municipality of Sainte-Anne-de-Beaupré was created (effectively the parish municipality was re-incorporated as a village). In 1920, a new parish municipality was founded by ceding from the village municipality.

In 1973, the parish municipality and village municipality merged again to form the City (ville) of Sainte-Anne-de-Beaupré.

== Demographics ==
In the 2021 Census of Population conducted by Statistics Canada, Sainte-Anne-de-Beaupré had a population of 2,888 living in 1,412 of its 1,499 total private dwellings, a change of 0.3% from its 2016 population of 2,880. With a land area of 62.38 km^{2} (24.09 sq mi), it had a population density of 46.3/km^{2} (119.9/sq mi) in 2021.

Historical census populations – Sainte-Anne-de-Beaupré

Year	Pop.	±%
1976	3,284	—
1981	3,292	+0.2%
1986	3,162	−3.9%
1991	3,146	−0.5%
1996	3,023	−3.9%

Year	Pop.	±%
2001	2,752	−9.0%
2006	2,803	+1.9%
2011	2,854	+1.8%
2016	2,880	+0.9%
2021	2,888	+0.3%

Population counts are not adjusted for boundary changes.
Source: Statistics Canada

Historical census populations – Sainte-Anne-de-Beaupré Parish (1855–1906, 1920–1973)

Year	Pop.	±%
1871	1,154	—
1881	1,245	+7.9%
1891	1,613	+29.6%
1901	1,939	+20.2%
1921	962	−50.4%
1931	1,035	+7.6%

Year	Pop.	±%
1941	959	−7.3%
1951	1,080	+12.6%
1956	1,231	+14.0%
1961	1,382	+12.3%
1966	1,717	+24.2%
1971	1,479	−13.9%

Source: Statistics Canada

Historical census populations – Sainte-Anne-de-Beaupré Village (1906–1973)

Year	Pop.	±%
1911	2,381	—
1921	1,648	−30.8%
1931	1,901	+15.4%
1941	1,783	−6.2%
1951	1,827	+2.5%

Year	Pop.	±%
1956	1,865	+2.1%
1961	1,878	+0.7%
1966	1,523	−18.9%
1971	1,797	+18.0%

Source: Statistics Canada

Mother tongue (2021):

- English as first language: 0.9%
- French as first language: 97.7%
- English and French as first language: 0.5%
- Other as first language: 0.9%

== Local government ==
List of former mayors:

- Huguette Chevalier (...–2005)
- Jean-Luc Fortin (2005–2017)
- Jacques Bouchard (2017–present)

== Attractions ==
The Basilica of Sainte-Anne-de-Beaupré is a major Roman Catholic place of pilgrimage. It has a copy of Michelangelo's statue, the Pietà (the original is in the St. Peter's Basilica in Rome). The basilica is known as a place of miracles. One of the builders of the original church, Louis Guimont, helped build the church despite having severe scoliosis and needing the aid of a crutch. When the church was complete, he was able to walk independently.

Many subsequent visitors who have prayed at the church have left their canes, crutches and walking aids behind as testament to their healing. The main wall at the entry into the basilica is completely covered with crutches.

In addition to the basilica, the town contains numerous religious edifices, the chief being the Scala Santa, built in imitation of the Holy Stairs in Rome.

The town is home of the Cyclorama of Jerusalem, a circular painting depicting the city of Jerusalem at the time of the death of Jesus.

Canyon Sainte-Anne, lying 6 km east of the town, is a steep walled gorge. A 74 meters (243 ft) waterfall lies within the canyon. The canyon is accessible to visitors via footpaths and foot bridges.

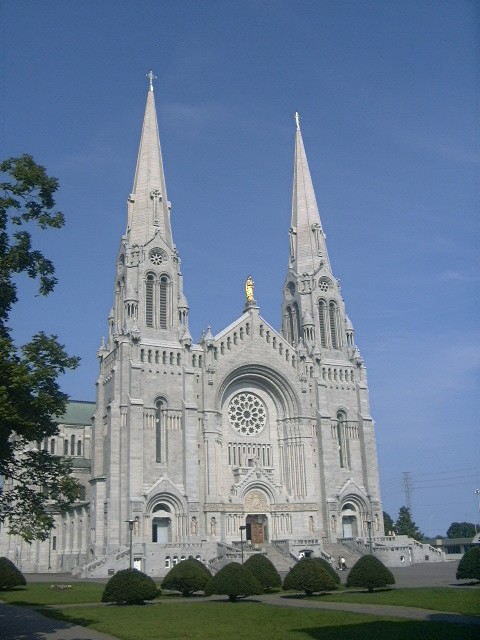
Basilica of Sainte-Anne-de-Beaupré

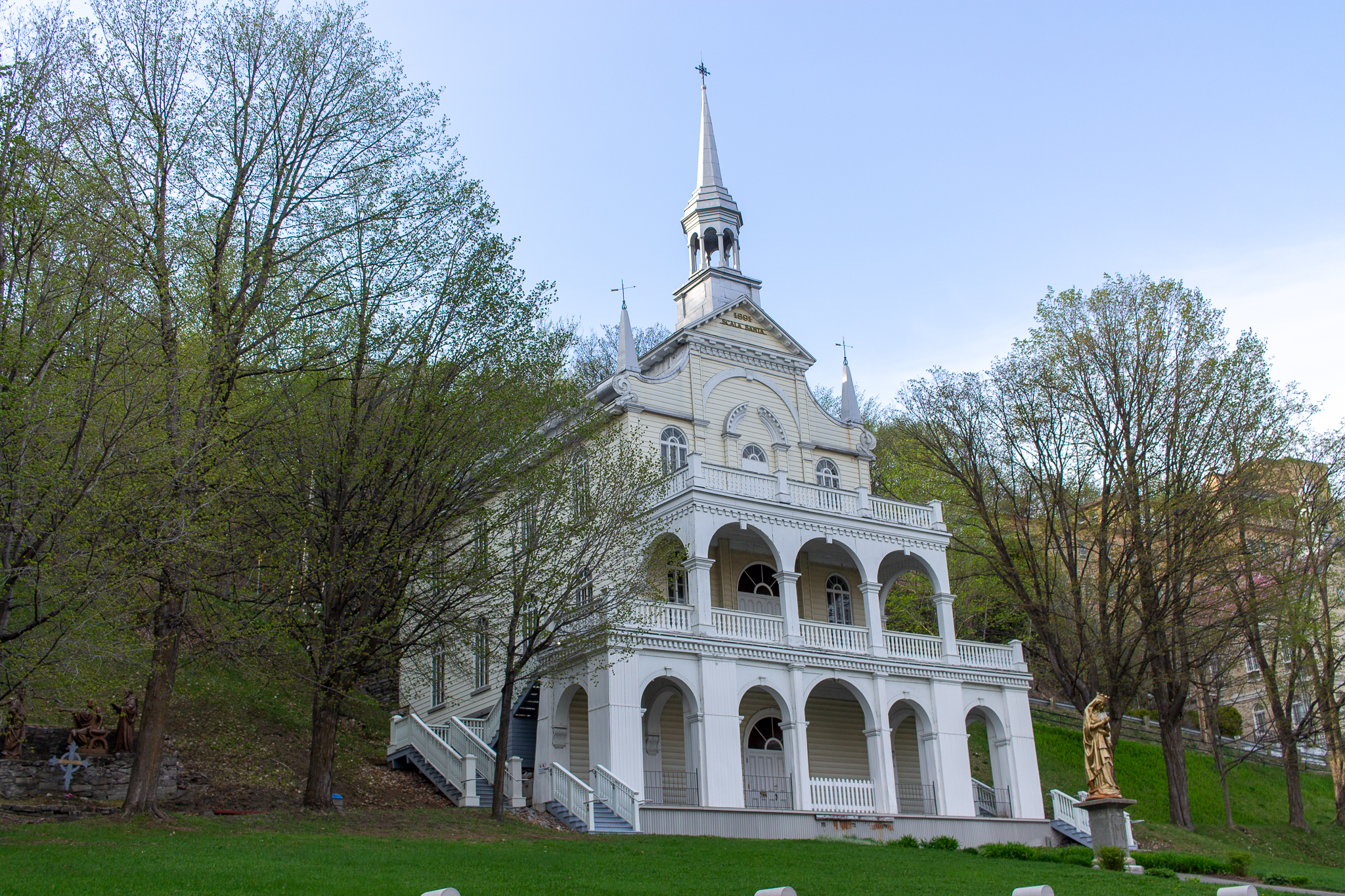
Scala Santa

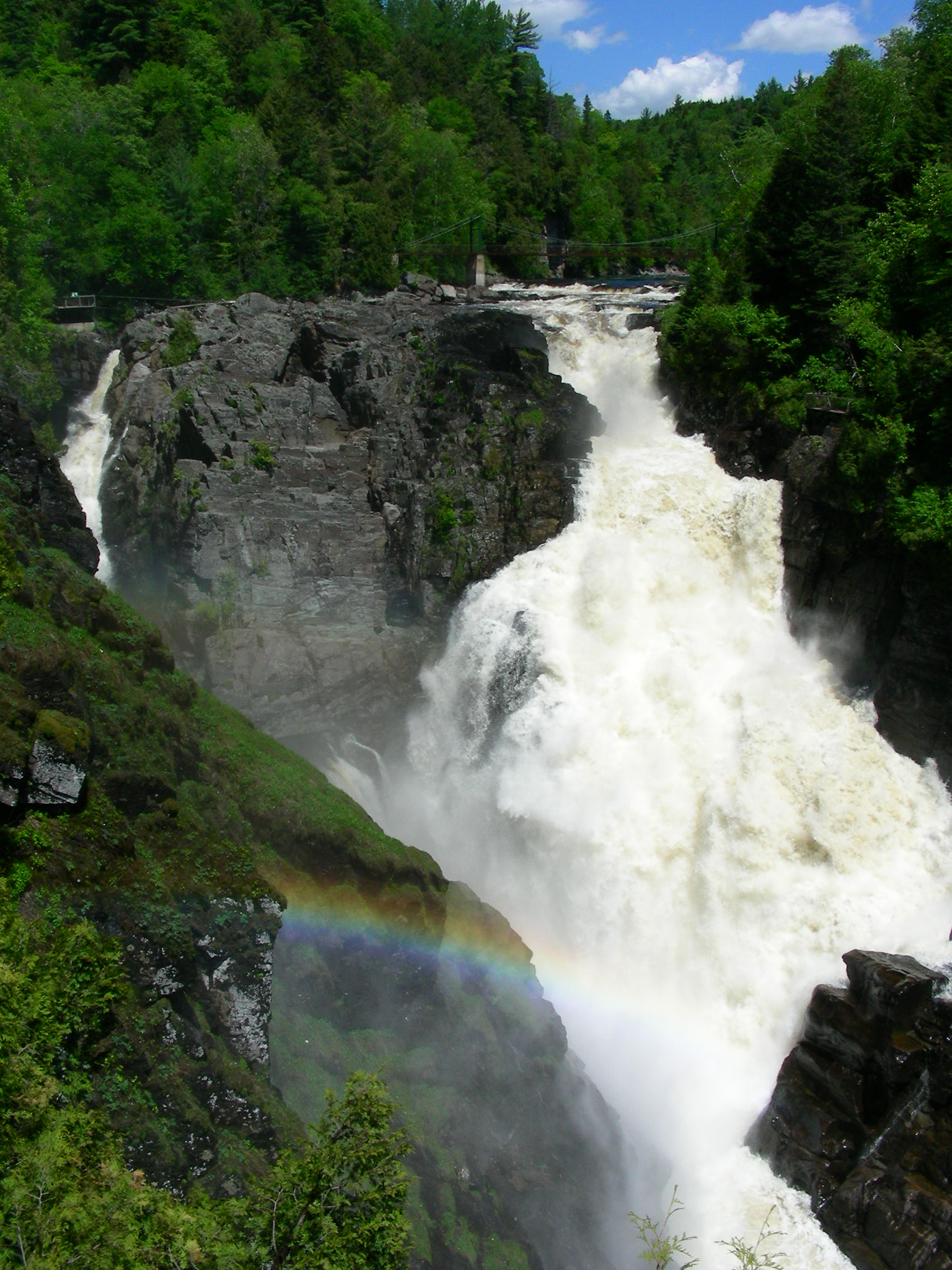
Sainte-Anne Falls in Canyon Sainte-Anne

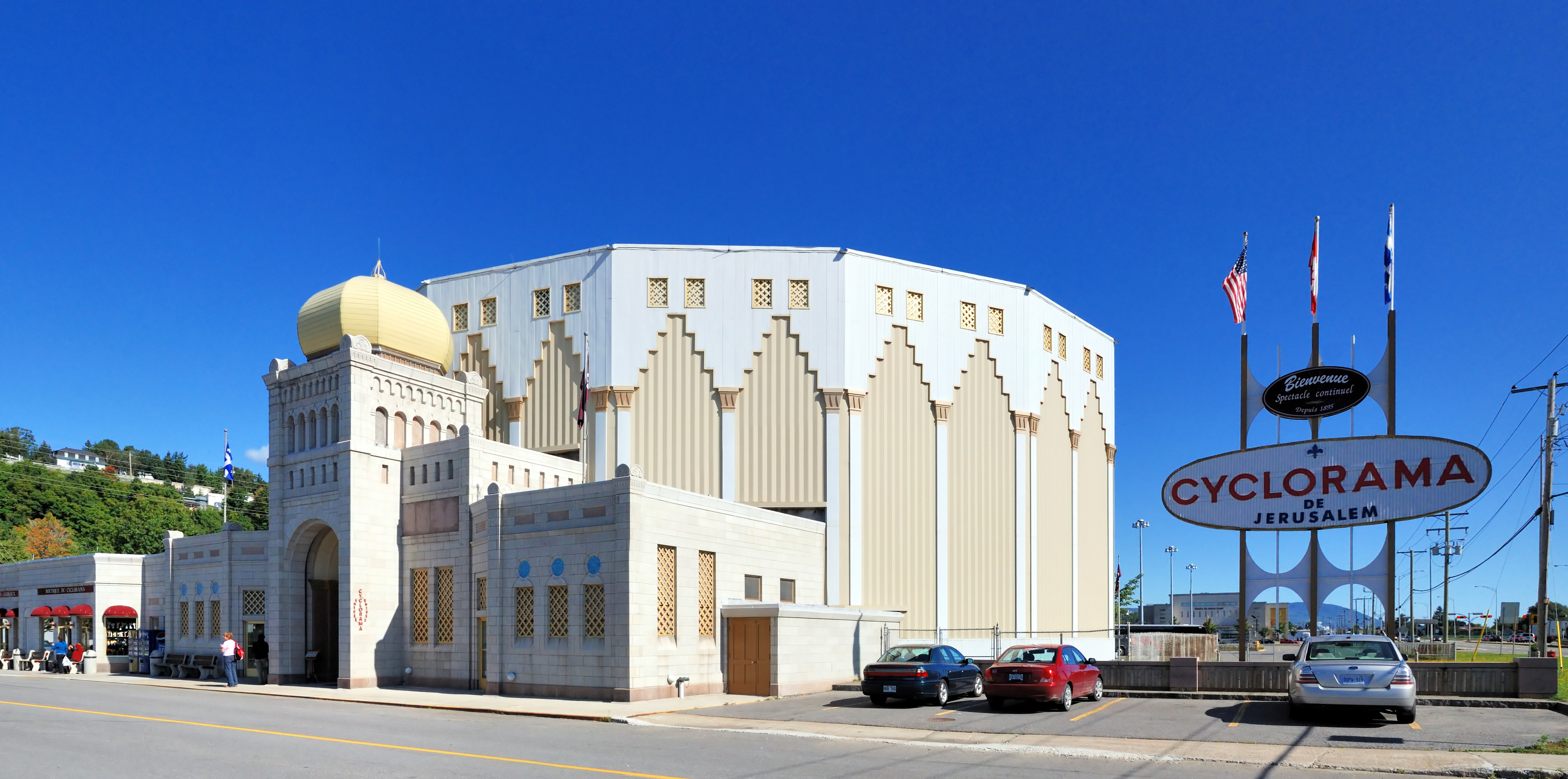
Cyclorama of Jerusalem

== Ecology ==
Researchers have studied the intertidal marshes of the St. Lawrence estuary at Sainte-Anne-de-Beaupré.

== See also ==
- Charlevoix tourist train
- List of cities in Quebec
