= John By =

British military engineer

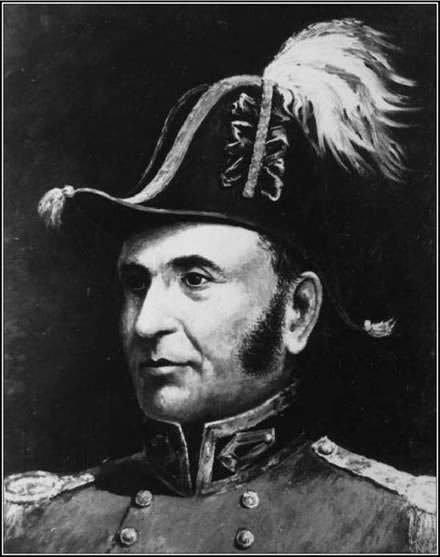
- John By; Royal Engineers Museum
- Born: 7 August 1779; Lambeth, Surrey
- Died: 1 February 1836 (aged 56); Shernfold Park, Frant, Sussex
- Burial place: St Alban's Church, Frant, Sussex
- Education: Royal Military Academy
- Spouses: Elizabeth Johnson Baines (m. 1801–1814) Esther March (m. 1818–1836)
- Children: Esther By Ashburnham (1820–1848); Harriet Martha By (1822–1842)
- Military career
- Allegiance: United Kingdom
- Branch: Board of Ordnance
- Years of service: 1799–1836
- Rank: Lieutenant Colonel
- Service number: 298
- Units: Royal Artillery; Corps of Royal Engineers
- Commands: CRE, Royal Gunpowder Mills, 1812– Rideau Canal, 1826–32
- Campaigns: Peninsular War, 1811
- Memorials: Major's Hill Park, Ottawa, Ontario, Canada; Peninsula and Waterloo Campaigns 1808–15 Memorial, Rochester Cathedral, Rochester, Kent

Lieutenant-Colonel John By (7 August 1779 – 1 February 1836) was an English military engineer. He is best known for having supervised the construction of the Rideau Canal and for having founded Bytown in the process. It developed and was designated as the Canadian capital, Ottawa.

== Life and career ==
By was born in Lambeth, Surrey, the second of three sons of George By, of the London Customs House, and Mary Bryan. Nothing certain is known about By’s early education; Andrews suggests that it could have been at Sir Thomas Rich's School in Longlevens. He gained a good knowledge of arithmetic and writing; competence in English, French and Latin; and some drawing skills, as he was admitted at age 13 to the Royal Military Academy, Woolwich. He graduated from the academy in 1799.

In August of that year, he was gazetted a second lieutenant in the Royal Artillery; by the end of the year he had transferred to the Royal Engineers. In 1800 he was posted to the fortifications at Plymouth, which were being modernised.

In July 1802 By was posted to Canada, where he worked on the fortification of Quebec City and on improving the navigability of the Saint Lawrence River. In early 1811 By returned to England. He was almost immediately posted to Portugal, where he served during the Napoleonic Wars before falling ill (probably with malaria); he was back in England in August. The Royal Engineers' Window in Rochester Cathedral indicates that By served without injury during the conflicts.

In 1812, By was appointed Commanding Royal Engineer of the Royal Gunpowder Mills in Waltham Abbey. A huge explosion had occurred there on 27 November 1811, when "no. 4 Press House and the adjoining Corning House blew up, killing seven workmen and breaking windows in Hackney ten miles away." By directed the reconstruction of the corning house and built two new gunpowder mills. He also introduced two new presses to replace the twelve that had been lost. The new presses, and a new design of charcoal press, proved to be more efficient and cheaper to run.

At the end of the war, By retired from the military. In 1826, because of his engineering experience in Canada, he was recalled and assigned there to supervise the construction of the Rideau Canal between Ottawa and Kingston. Since the canal was to begin in the wild and sparsely populated Ottawa River valley, his first task was the construction of a town to house the workmen and labourers of associated services. The resulting settlement, called Bytown in his honour, was later renamed after the river. It was designated as the capital of Canada.

The canal was completed in six years, and was acclaimed as an engineering triumph. It had huge cost overruns, however, and became a political scandal for the Board of Ordnance. Colonel By was recalled to London, where he was accused of having made unauthorised expenditures. The charges were spurious, and a parliamentary committee exonerated him. By petitioned Wellington and other military leaders to review his case, but the damage was done. He was forced to retire and never received a formal commendation for his great achievement on the canal. By retired to Frant in Sussex and died in 1836; he is buried in the village of Frant.

=== Family ===
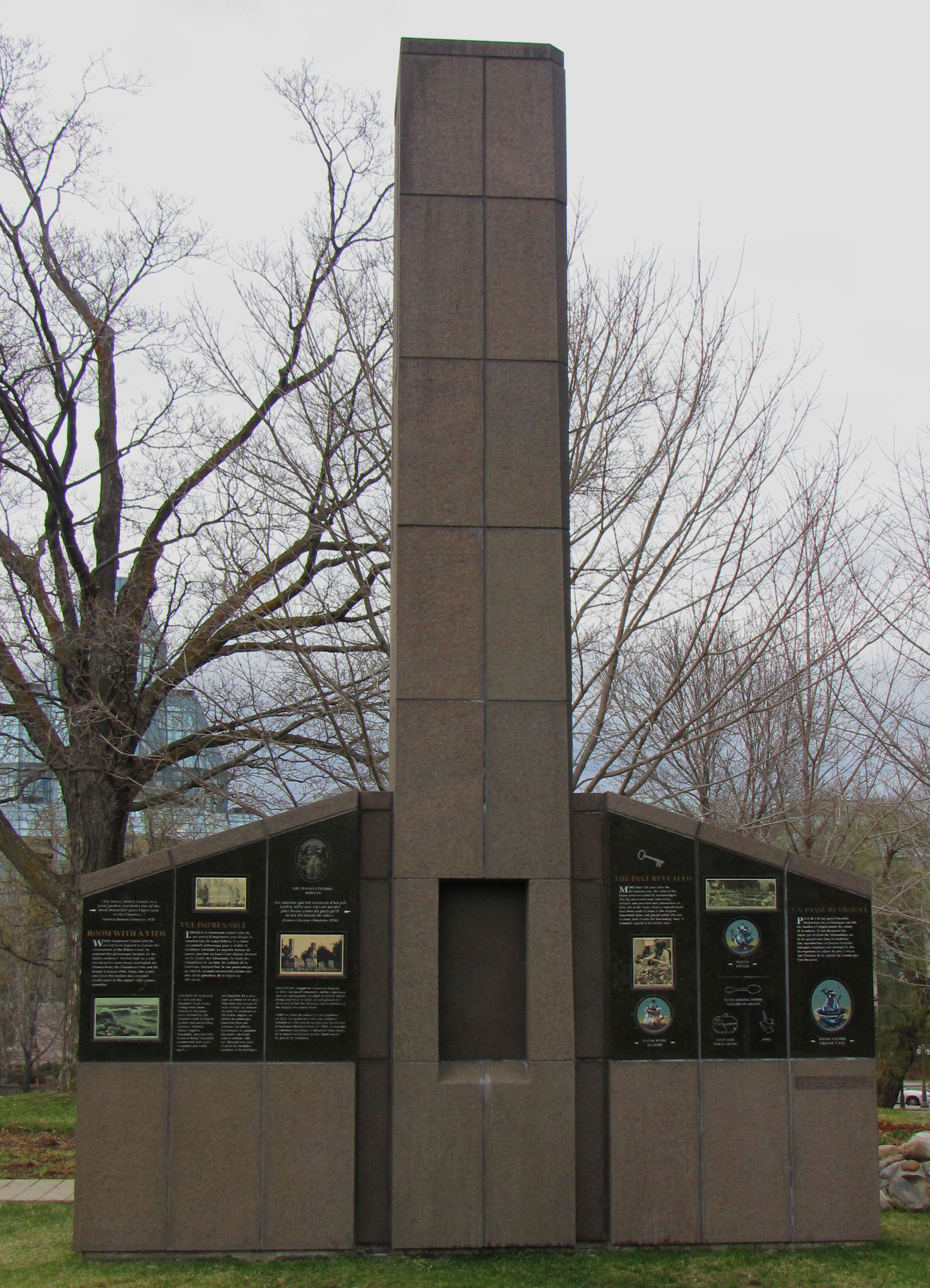
Sculpture marking location of his residence in Major's Hill Park, Ottawa

John By married twice. He first married Elizabeth Johnson Baines, daughter of a naval captain, at Madron on 12 November 1801. Elizabeth died in December 1814 and was buried on 16 December at Cheshunt.

Secondly, he married Esther March in Cheshunt on 14 March 1818. John and Esther had two daughters: Harriet Martha, born on 14 March 1821 in Frant. She died unmarried on 2 October 1842 and was buried at St. Alban's churchyard in Frant. Her parents were later buried there near her.

The second daughter was Esther March, born on 18 February 1819 in Marylebone, She married Percy Ashburnham, a younger son of the George, 3rd Earl of Ashburnham, in Ticehurst in 1838, and had two children: Esther Harriet in 1844, who died the following year; and Mary Catherine in 1847, who died aged three. Esther March Ashburnham died on 6 February 1848 and was also buried at Frant.

By was survived by two brothers:

- George By – born 1779, died 1840, without children
- Henry By – born 1780, married; died 1852. He was buried in West Hoathly. He was predeceased by his son in 1847 (who had no children).

== Legacy ==
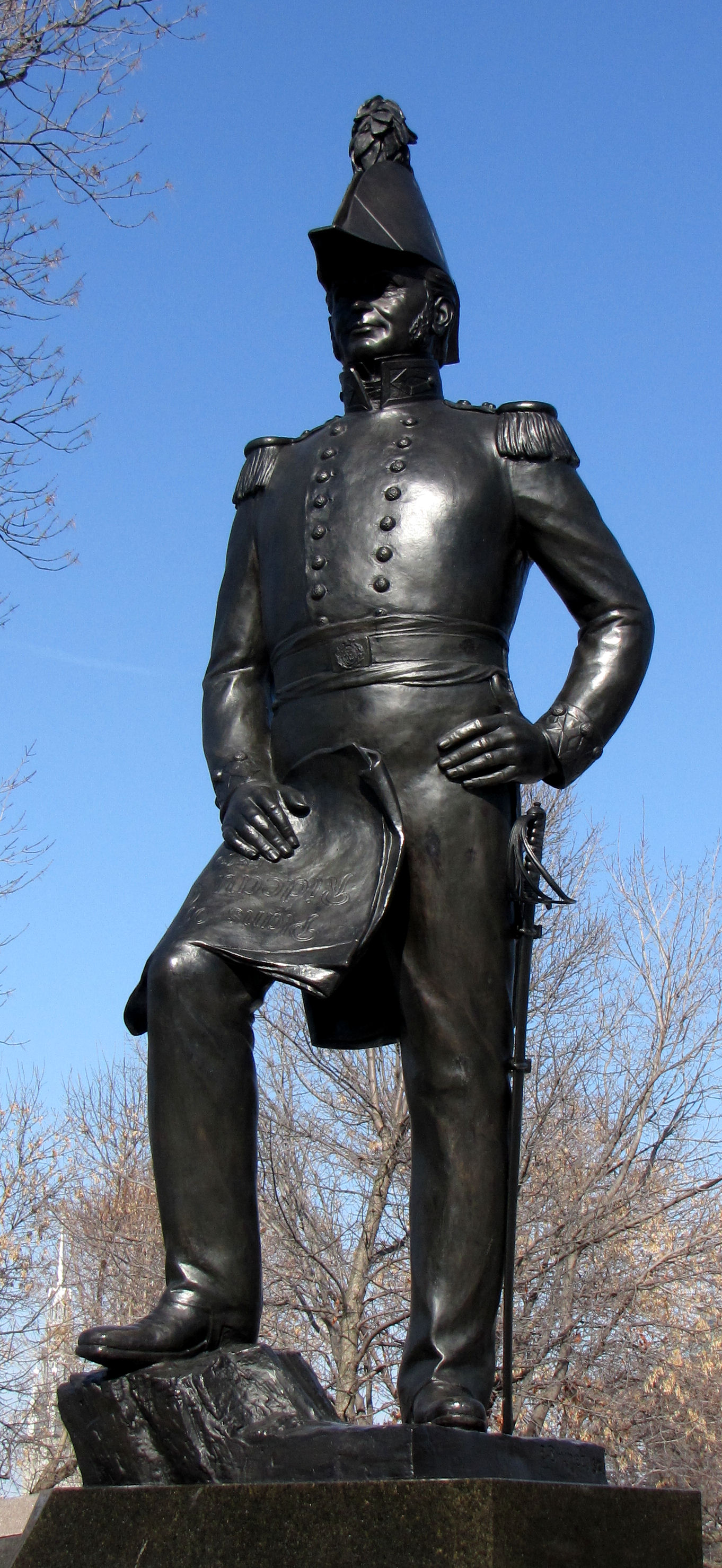
Joseph-Émile Brunet's statue of John By in Major's Hill Park, Ottawa

John was honored in numerous places:

- The Byward Market area of Ottawa's Lower Town was named for him.
- His statue, executed by Joseph-Émile Brunet and unveiled in 1971, stands in nearby Major's Hill Park.
- Ottawa's Colonel By Secondary School was named for him.
- The scenic parkway of Colonel By Drive was named for him. It follows the first stretch of the canal 8 km through the city from Rideau Street in Lower Town to the falls at Hogs Back.
- The engineering building, Col. By Hall, was unveiled in September 2005 at the University of Ottawa:

"Colonel By Hall 161 Louis Pasteur – Colonel By Hall, home to the Faculty of Engineering, is named in honour of Lieutenant-Colonel John By of the Royal Engineers, who led the construction of the Rideau Canal. Completed in 1832, the Rideau Canal was a remarkable engineering endeavour at the time, connecting a series of lakes and rivers to provide a secure supply route from Lake Ontario to Bytown, which became the city of Ottawa 150 years ago. September 2005"

- In 1979, to commemorate the bicentenary of his birth, Canada Post issued a stamp bearing his image.
- In Ottawa, Colonel By Day is the name given to the Ontario August civic holiday.
- Colonel By Lake is an artificial lake on the Rideau Canal.
- Colonel By Park is a waterfront park at Upper Brewers Locks on the Rideau Canal.
- Colonel By Valley was named for him on 26 September 1976, 150 years to the day that he and the Earl of Dalhousie, the Governor of British North America, chose the site as the beginning of the canal.

== Sundial ==
A sundial behind the present-day site of East Block on Parliament Hill and overlooking the set of locks was used on that site by the Royal Sappers and Miners under Lt Colonel John By, RE in 1826–27. It was restored in 1919. During the construction of the Rideau Canal, Barracks Hill was the site of the military barracks and military hospital.

=== Plaques ===
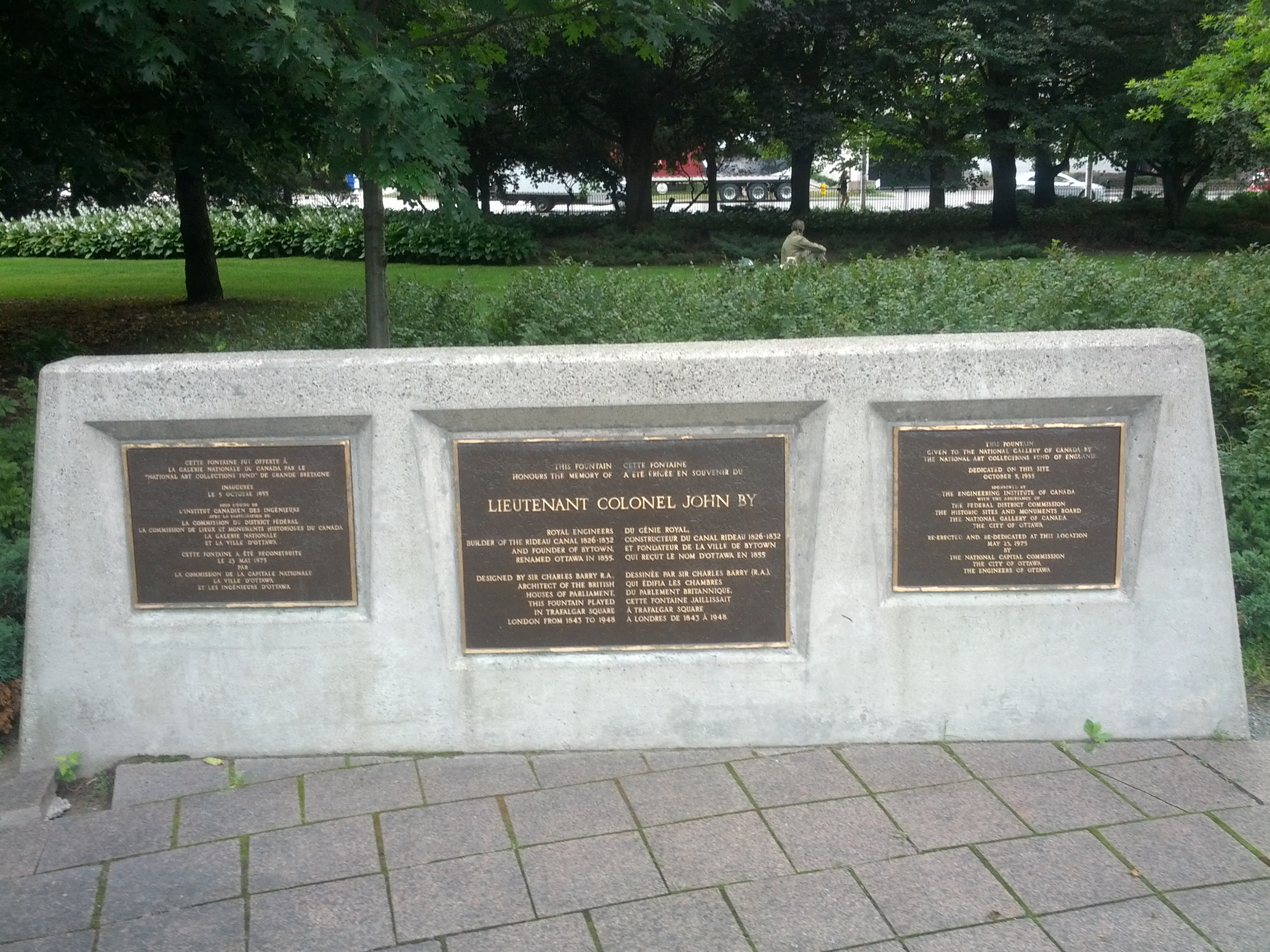
Plaque commemorating fountain in memory of John By in Ottawa

A historical plaque located on the grounds of Colonel By Secondary School states,

"Colonel John By (1779–1836) was born and educated in England and first came to Canada in 1802. As a member of the Royal Engineers, he worked on the first small locks on the St. Lawrence River as well as the fortifications of Quebec. He returned to England in 1811 and fought in the Peninsular War, but came back to Canada in 1826 to spend five summers heading the construction of the Rideau Canal, the 200 km long waterway, which now connects Ottawa and Kingston. This formidable task included the building of about 50 dams and 47 locks, without the aid of modern equipment. But the amazing feat was never recognized in Colonel By's own lifetime, and he died three years after its completion, never imagining that many thousands of Canadians would greatly admire and value his achievement in the centuries to come. Colonel By's attributes of courage, determination, and diligence inspire us to emulate him, in the hopes that we too may somehow serve our country in a way which will benefit future generations."

A plaque was erected by the Ontario Archaeological and Historic Sites Board at Jones Falls Lockstation commemorating Lieutenant Colonel John By, Royal Engineers, the superintending engineer in charge of the construction of the Rideau Canal. The plaque notes that the 123-mile long Rideau Canal, built as a military route and incorporating 47 locks, 16 lakes, two rivers, and a 350-foot-long (110 m), 60-foot-high (18 m) dam at Jones Falls, was completed in 1832.

A plaque was installed by the Province of Ontario in the stairwell of Lambeth Town Hall, in Brixton, London, England, commemorating By's Lambeth origins.
