= Basilica of Sainte-Anne-de-Beaupré =

- Basilique Sainte-Anne-de-Beaupré
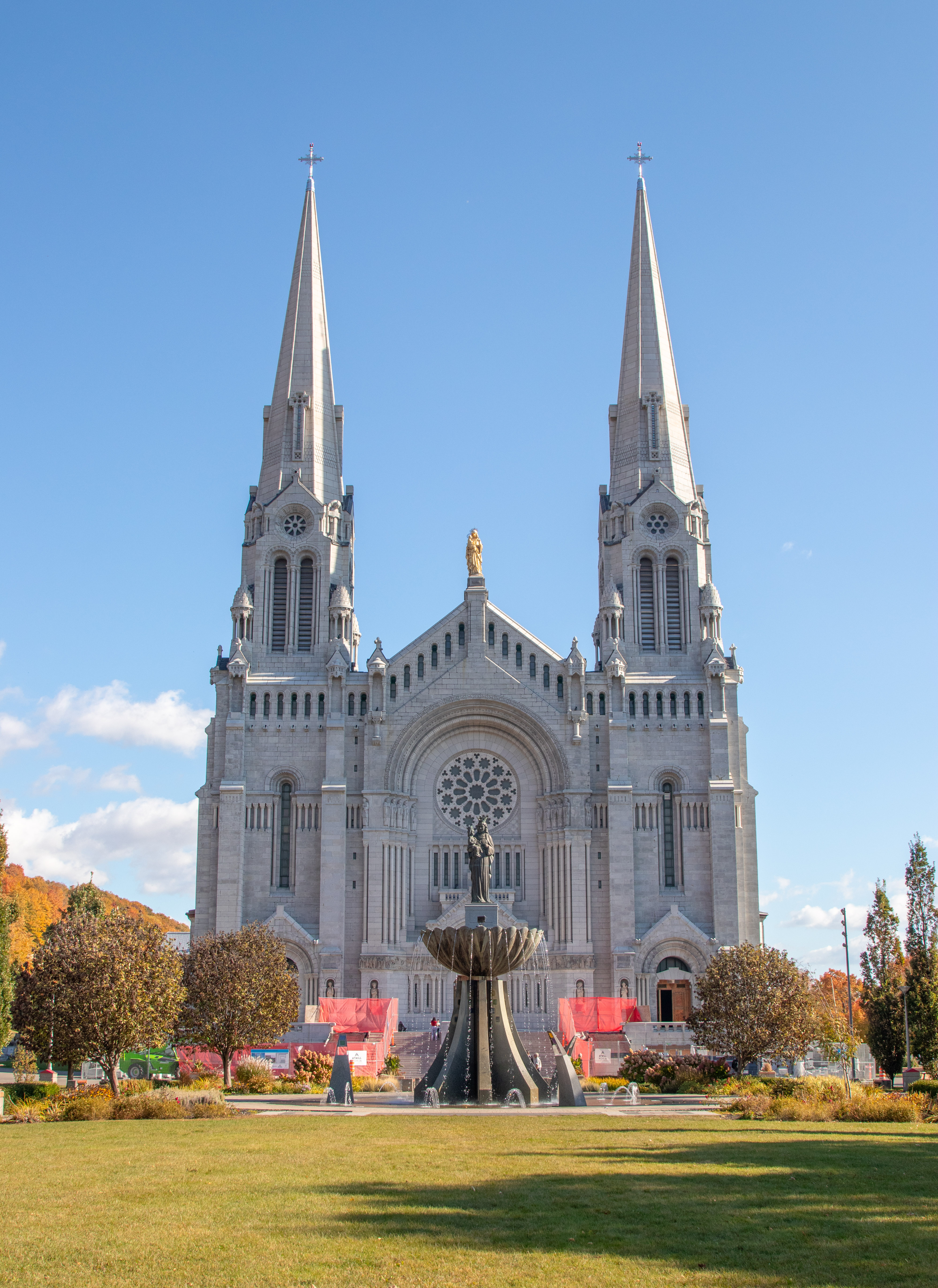
- Basilica of Sainte-Anne-de-Beaupré

- Location within Central Quebec
- 47°01′27″N 70°55′42″W
- Location: Sainte-Anne-de-Beaupré, Quebec
- Country: Canada
- Denomination: Catholic Church
- Website: sanctuairesainteanne.org

History
- Status: Basilica

Architecture
- Functional status: Active
- Architectural type: Norman-Gothic, Romanesque Revival
- Completed: 1946

Specifications
- Length: 105 m (344 ft)
- Width: 48 m (157 ft)

Administration
- Archdiocese

Patrimoine culturel du Québec
- Type: Recognized heritage immovable
- Designated: 2001
- Reference no.: 93392

The Basilica of Sainte-Anne-de-Beaupré (French: Basilique Sainte-Anne-de-Beaupré) is a basilica set along the Saint Lawrence River in Quebec, Canada, 30 kilometres (19 mi) east of Quebec City, and one of the six national shrines of Canada. It has been credited by the Catholic Church with many miracles of curing the sick and disabled. It is an important Catholic sanctuary, which receives about a half-million pilgrims each year. Since 1933 they have included members of the Anna Fusco Pilgrimage from Connecticut. The peak period of pilgrimage is around July 26, the feast of Saint Anne, the patron saint of sailors.

== History ==
The basilica in Sainte-Anne-de-Beaupré was initially a shrine to honour Saint Anne. On March 8, 1658, settler Étienne de Lessard donated two frontal acres from the west end of his property to the Catholic Church, so that a chapel could be built. This chapel eventually became the site of the modern-day basilica. The chapel was built to provide a place of worship for the new settlers in the area and to house a miraculous statue of St. Anne. The first reported miracle at the site happened during the shrine's construction.

A man named Louis Guimont was hired to help build the shrine even though he suffered from rheumatism. After placing three stones upon the shrine's foundation, Guimont was cured of all his ailments. This was followed by other testimonies of healed people, and the shrine soon grew in popularity. Many pilgrims came to the shrine hoping to receive a miracle while others, like Anne of Austria, wife of Louis XIII and Queen of France, supported the shrine from a distance. Because of the popularity of the shrine, the building was enlarged several times to accommodate all the pilgrims. In the late nineteenth century, a basilica was constructed around the shrine. In 1876, the first basilica opened for worship.

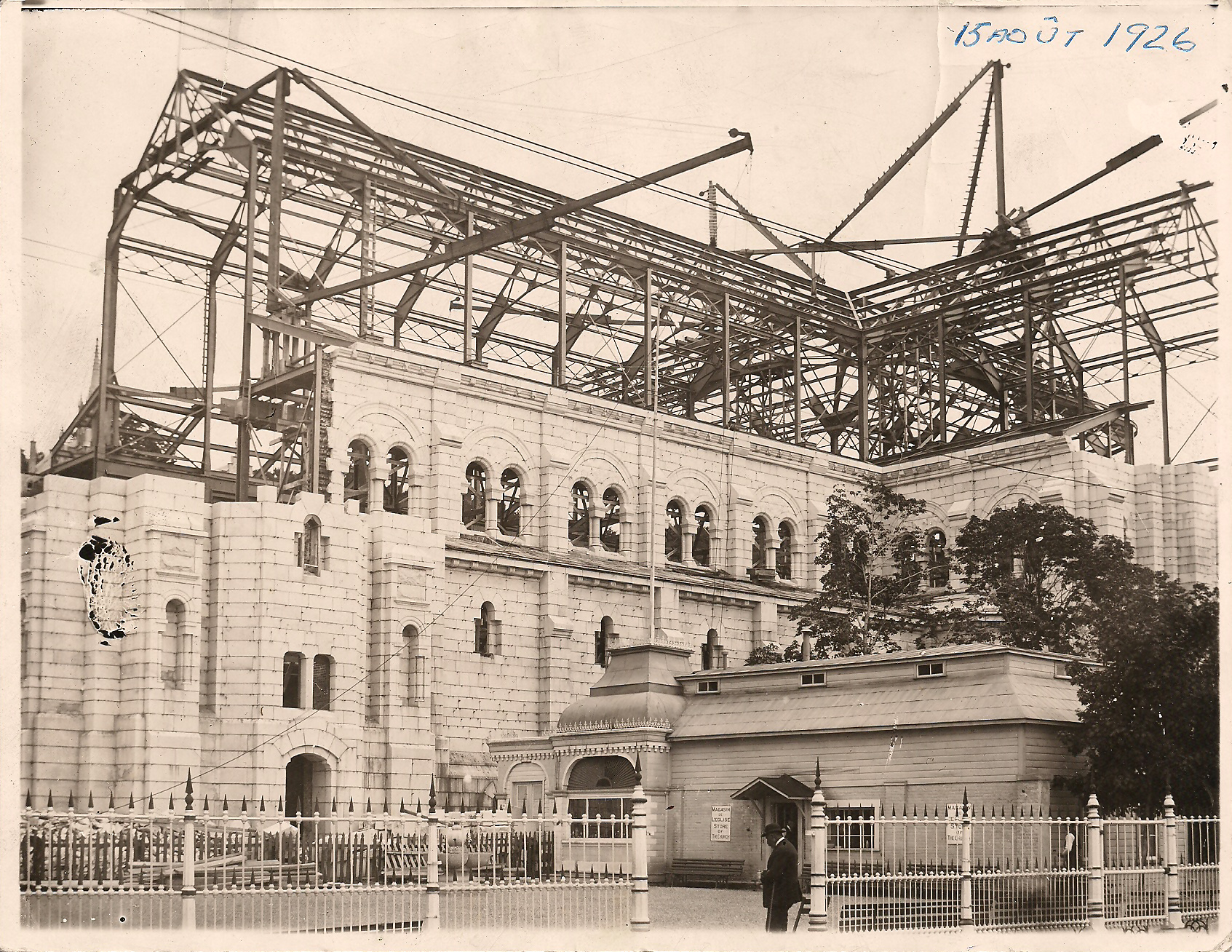
Construction of the present day basilica building in 1926.

This was destroyed in a fire on March 29, 1922. The present-day basilica was built in 1926 on the site of the prior church. Architects Maxime Roisin, Louis N. Audet and Joseph-Égilde-Césaire Daoust collaborated on the project from 1923 to 1931. After the end of the Great Depression, work on the interior resumed in 1937, and was finally completed in 1946.

Pilgrims are attracted from across Canada and the United States. Miracles are still believed to occur at the basilica. Two pillars near the entrance are filled with racks of crutches, canes, braces, and other signs of disabilities. Each item has been left by a pilgrim who reports being healed at the basilica.

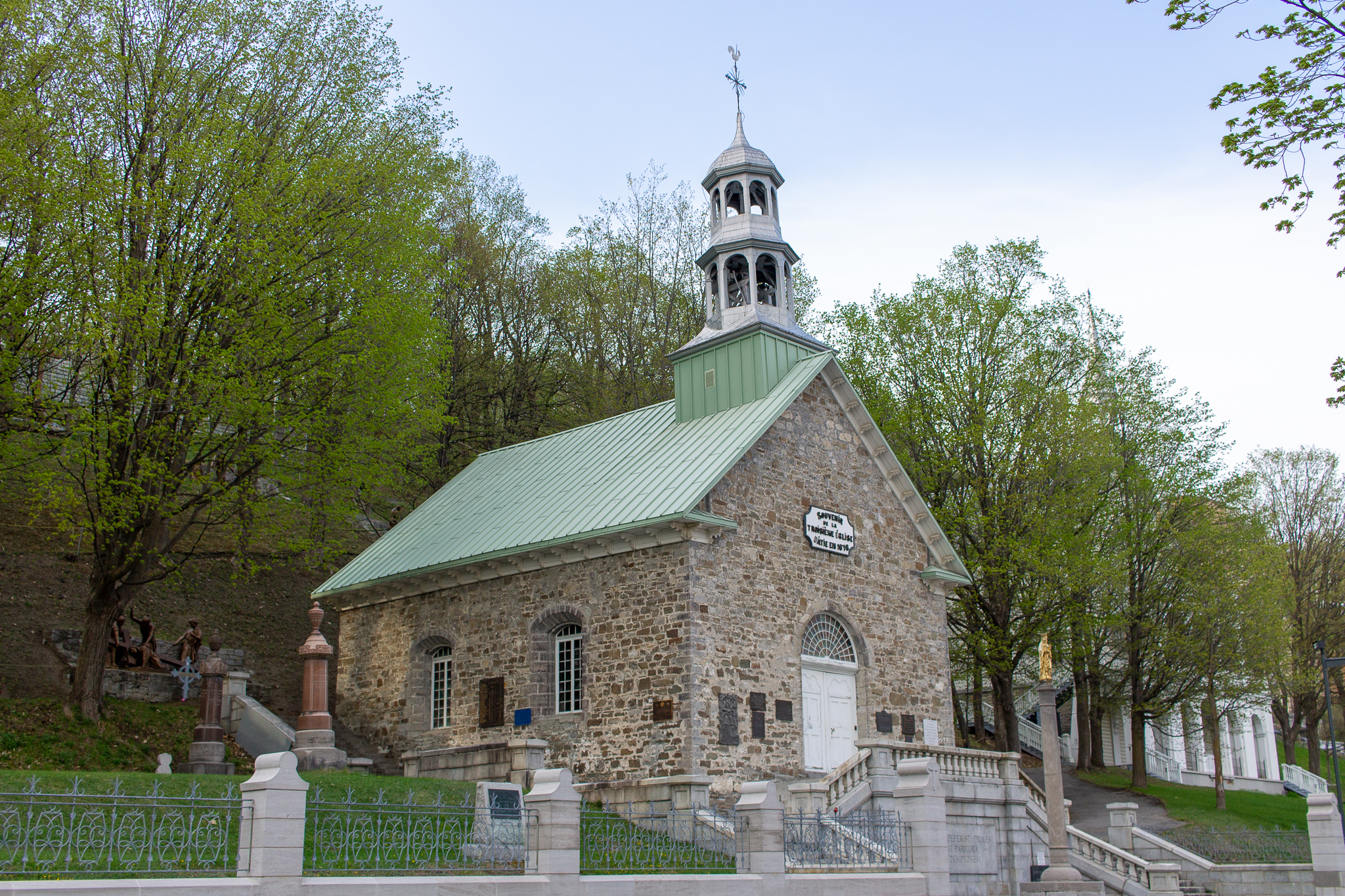
Memorial chapel

The wooded hillside next to the basilica has a memorial chapel and a Way of the Cross, with life-sized Stations of the Cross. Higher up the hill the Convent of the Redemptoristines can be found. Built in 1906 and declared a historic site in 2001, it no longer operates as a convent and has essentially been abandoned in the early 21st century.

== Architecture ==
The total length of the building is 105 metres (344 ft) long, and 48 metres (157 ft) wide; with a transept width of 61 metres (200 ft). The height of the building's steeple is 91 metres (299 ft).

=== Interior ===
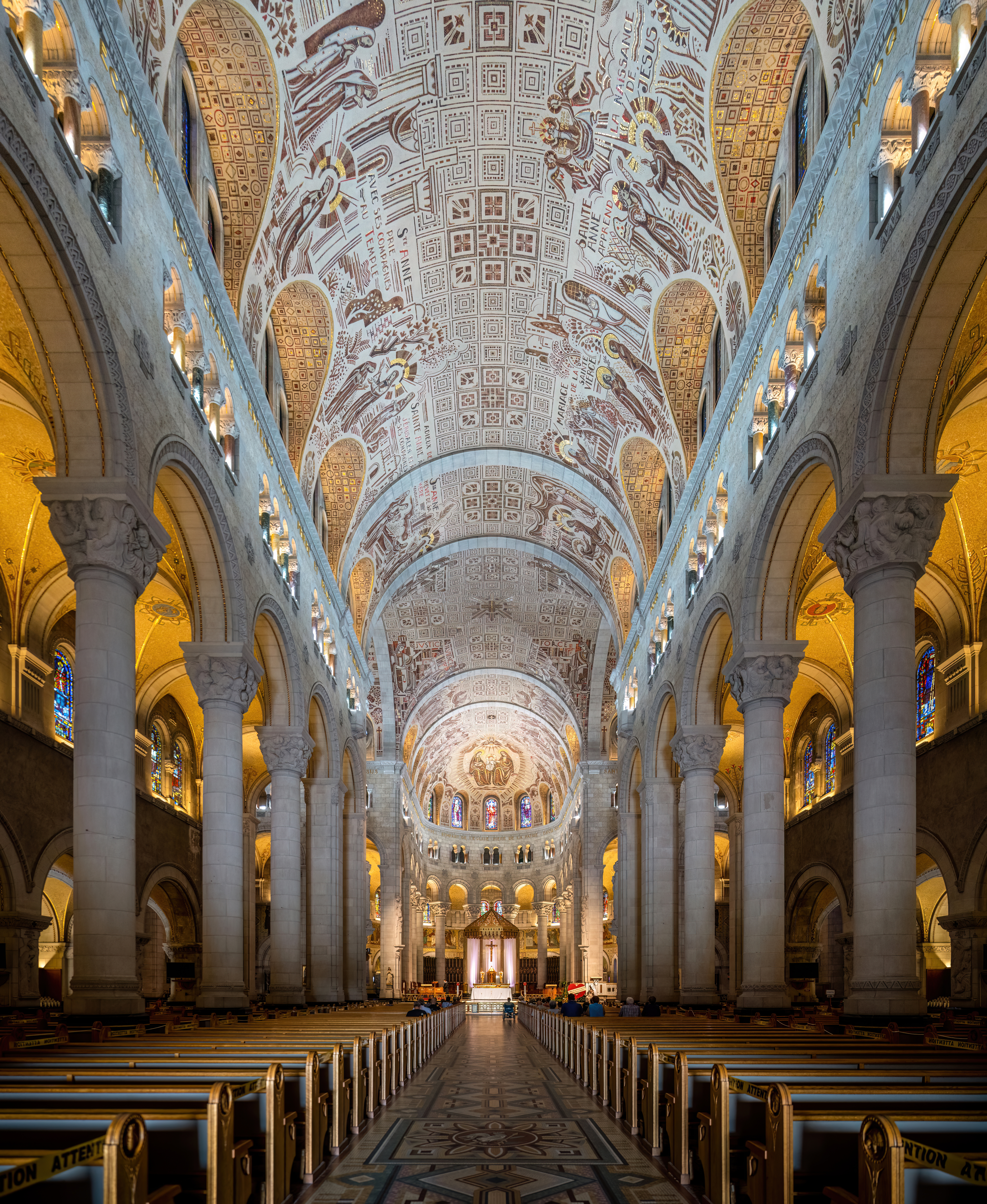
Interior of the basilica

Joseph-Émile Brunet designed twenty-four capitals (1948) for the Basilica of Sainte-Anne-de-Beaupré, which depict 52 religious subjects reflecting the life of Jesus. He sculpted 14 "Stations of the Cross" lining the walls of the cathedral, with stone statues of Saint Anne and Saints at the entrance of the cathedral. Joseph-Émile Brunet also created the fountain in front of the Basilica and the 7' 6"-high stone sculpture in niches that can be seen on entering the basilica, Saint "Marie de L'Incarnation", "Saint Joseph", "The Virgin with Jesus", Saint "François de Laval", and "St. Joachim", in addition to a bronze sculpture of Saint Kateri Tekakwitha, 6' 4" high.
