= Ontario Highway 401 =

Controlled-access highway in Ontario

Highway 401
- Macdonald–Cartier Freeway; Highway of Heroes; Rt. Hon. Herb Gray Parkway
- Highway 401 highlighted in red

Route information
- Maintained by Ontario Ministry of Transportation
- Length: 828.0 km (514.5 mi)
- History: Proposed 1938; Opened December 1947 – October 11, 1968; Extended June 28 and November 21, 2015; Extended July 27, 2026

Major junctions
- West end: Gordie Howe International Bridge – Windsor
- Highway 402 – London; 407 ETR – Milton; Highway 403 / Highway 410 – Mississauga; Highway 427 – Toronto; Highway 400 – Toronto; Highway 404 / Don Valley Parkway – Toronto; Highway 412 – Whitby; Highway 418 – Courtice; Highway 35 / Highway 115 – Clarington; Highway 416 – Johnstown
- East end: A-20 – Quebec border

Location
- Country: Canada
- Province: Ontario
- Major cities: Windsor, London, Kitchener, Cambridge, Mississauga, Toronto, Oshawa, Kingston, and Cornwall

Highway system
- Ontario provincial highways; Current; Former; 400-series
← Highway 400	→ Highway 402
Former provincial highways
← Highway 400A

King's Highway 401, commonly referred to as Highway 401 and officially known as the Macdonald–Cartier Freeway or colloquially referred to as the four-oh-one, is a 400-series highway in the Canadian province of Ontario. It is an 828-kilometre (514 mi) freeway, travelling from the Gordie Howe International Bridge at Windsor in the west to the Ontario–Quebec border in the east (west of Montreal). The part of Highway 401 that passes through Toronto is North America's busiest highway, and one of the widest in Canada. Together with Quebec's Autoroute 20 (A-20), it forms the road transportation backbone of the Quebec City–Windsor Corridor, along which more than half of Canada's population resides. It is also a Core Route in Canada's National Highway System.

By the end of 1952, three individual highways were numbered Highway 401: the partially completed Toronto Bypass between Weston Road and Highway 11 (Yonge Street); Highway 2A between West Hill and Newcastle; and the Scenic Highway between Gananoque and Brockville, now known as the "Thousand Islands Parkway". These three sections of the highway were 11.8, 54.7, and 41.2 kilometres (7.3, 34.0, and 25.6 mi), respectively. In November 1964, the route became fully navigable from Windsor to the Ontario–Quebec border. In January 1965, it was given a second designation, the Macdonald–Cartier Freeway, in honour of two Fathers of Confederation. At the end of 1968, the Gananoque–Brockville section was bypassed and the final intersection grade-separated near Kingston, making Highway 401 a freeway for its entire 817.9-kilometre (508.2 mi) length. In August 2007, a portion of Highway 401 between Trenton and Toronto was designated as the Highway of Heroes, as the route is travelled by funeral convoys for fallen Canadian Forces personnel from CFB Trenton to the coroner's office in Toronto.

Highway 401 previously ended at Highway 3 (Talbot Road) upon entering Windsor. In 2011, construction began on a westward extension, the Rt. Hon. Herb Gray Parkway (formerly Windsor-Essex Parkway). This extension runs parallel to Highway 3 (Talbot Road and Huron Church Road) between the former end of the freeway and the E. C. Row Expressway, at which point, the extension turns and runs alongside the E.C. Row towards the Gordie Howe International Bridge, which has opened as of July 27, 2026. An eight-kilometre (5.0 mi) section of the parkway, east of the E. C. Row interchange, opened to traffic on June 28, 2015, with the remaining section completed and opened on November 21. The widening of Highway 401 from Highway/Regional Road 8 in Kitchener east to Townline Road in Cambridge to at least 10 lanes was completed on December 22, 2023. There are plans underway to widen the remaining four-lane sections between Windsor and London to six lanes and to widen the route between Cambridge and Milton as well as through Ajax, Whitby, and Oshawa. The expansive, 12-plus-lane collector–express system through Pickering and Toronto, and partially across Mississauga, was extended west to Milton in December 2022.

The speed limit is 110 km/h (68 mph), except between Highway 427 and Highway 404 in Toronto, where the speed limit is 100 km/h (62 mph), and west of Concession Road 9 in Windsor, where the speed limit is 80 km/h (50 mph). The route is patrolled by the Ontario Provincial Police (OPP) and maintained by the Ontario Ministry of Transportation (MTO).

== Route description ==
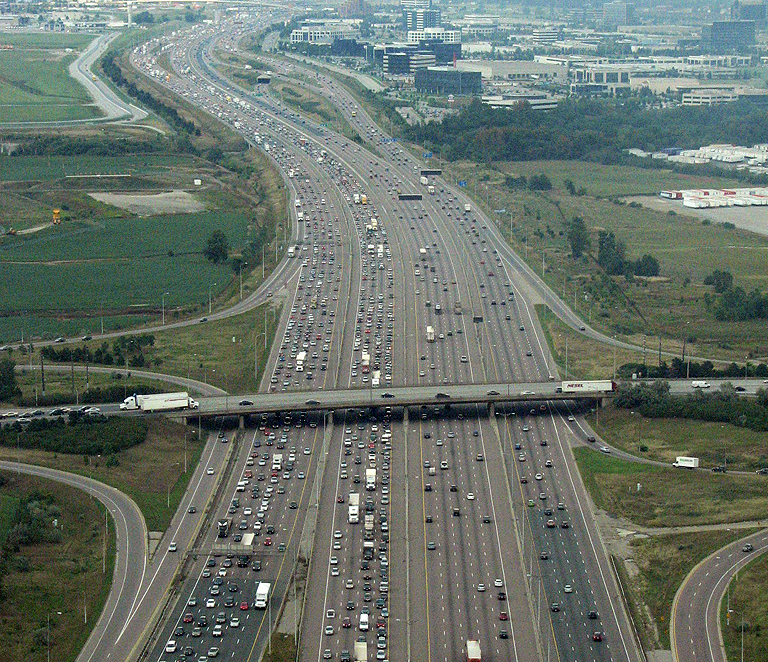
Looking east at the widest segment of Highway 401 which is near Toronto Pearson International Airport. In the foreground is the interchange with Dixie Road. In the background are the bridges crossing Etobicoke Creek and the Airport Basketweave.

Highway 401 extends across Southwestern, Central, and Eastern Ontario. In anticipation of the future expansion of the highway, the transportation ministry purchased a 91.4-metre-wide (300 ft) right-of-way along the entire length. Generally, the highway occupies only a portion of this allotment. It is one of the world's busiest highways; a 2019 analysis stated the annual average daily traffic (AADT) count between Renforth Drive and Highway 427 in Toronto was at 450,300, while a second study estimates that over 500,000 vehicles travel that section on some days. This makes it North America's busiest highway, surpassing the Santa Monica Freeway in Los Angeles and I-75 in Atlanta. The just-in-time auto parts delivery systems of the highly integrated automotive industry of Michigan and Ontario have contributed to the highway's status as the world's busiest truck route, carrying 60 percent of vehicular trade between Canada and the US.

Highway 401 also features North America's busiest multi-structure bridge at Hogg's Hollow in Toronto. The four bridges, two for each direction with the collector and express lanes, carried an average of 360,300 vehicles daily in 2019. The highway is one of the major backbones of a network in the Great Lakes region, connecting the populous Quebec City–Windsor corridor with Michigan, New York, and central Ontario's cottage country. It is the principal connection between Toronto and Montreal, becoming A-20 at the Quebec boundary.

=== Southwestern Ontario ===
Highway 401 begins at the Gordie Howe International Bridge, which crosses the Canada–United States border over the Detroit River and continues through a connection through Delray to I-75. Leaving the Canadian Port of Entry at the west end of the E. C. Row Expressway, Highway 401 is sandwiched between the E. C. Row's opposing carriageways for a short distance. Highway 401 then changes to a southeast direction as it descends into a trench and runs alongside Highway 3 (Huron Church Road and Talbot Road). This below-grade section of the highway has 11 tunnels to cross underneath surface streets (including those carrying the Highway 3 routing). After passing under Howard Avenue and the ramps to Talbot Road, the highway then curves northeast and ascends back to the surface. At the split with Dougall Parkway (former Highway 3B), which links to the Detroit–Windsor Tunnel, the highway turns east and exits Windsor. From here, Highway 401 mostly parallels the former route of Highway 98 from Windsor to Tilbury.

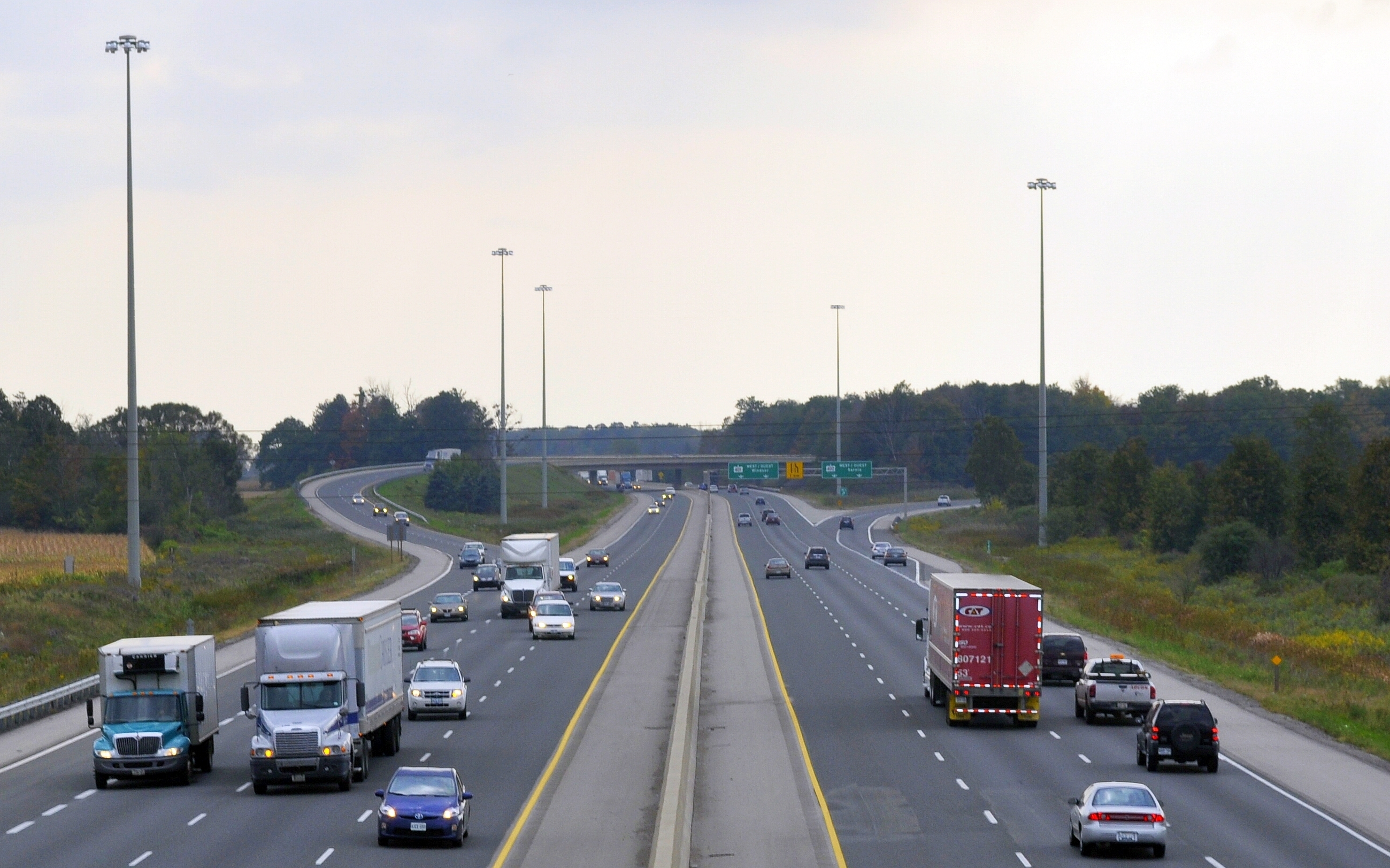
Highway 401 looking west at split with Highway 402 in London.

Southwestern Ontario is flat, primarily an agricultural land, that takes advantage of the fertile clay soil deposited throughout the region. The main river through the region is the Thames River, which drains the second-largest watershed in southern Ontario and largely influences the land use surrounding the highway. The highway's route parallels the river to the south between Tilbury and Woodstock.

Near Tilbury, Highway 401 loses its tall wall median barrier, then narrows to four lanes, following lot lines laid between concession roads in a plan designed to limit damage to the sensitive agricultural lands through which the highway runs. Here, the highway's flat, straight route is notorious for leading to driver inattention. The section from Windsor to London (especially west of Tilbury) has become known for deadly car accidents and pile-ups, earning it the nickname Carnage Alley. As the highway approaches London, Highway 402 merges in, resulting in a six-lane cross-section. Within London, it intersects the city's two municipal expressways, Highbury Avenue and the Veterans Memorial Parkway.

The section between London and Woodstock generally parallels the former Highway 2 but lies on the south side of the Thames River. This area is not as flat, but the freeway is generally straight. This part of Highway 401 often experiences heavy snowsqualls in early winter, sometimes extending as far east as Toronto. To the south of Woodstock, Highway 401 curves northeast as Highway 403 splits off at its western terminus. The freeway then meets the former Highway 2 at an interchange, reconfigured from a cloverleaf to a five-ramp parclo in the late 2000s, near the Toyota West Plant. From here, the highway heads towards Kitchener and Cambridge, substantially north of the route of the former Highway 2, which has been bypassed by Highway 403's western leg.

Heading towards Kitchener, the highway ascends as it crosses the Grand River, followed by interchanges with King Street (Waterloo Regional Road 8) and Highway 8 before returning to its eastward direction. Between Highway/Regional Road 8 and Highway/Regional Road 24 in Cambridge, the highway was widened in 2020 to twelve lanes to accommodate the growing traffic using that segment. Beyond Highway/Regional Road 24, the highway returns to a six-lane cross section, and meanders towards Milton, passing through hills and rock cuts along the way. As it enters Milton, it also enters Halton Region, part of the Greater Toronto Area.

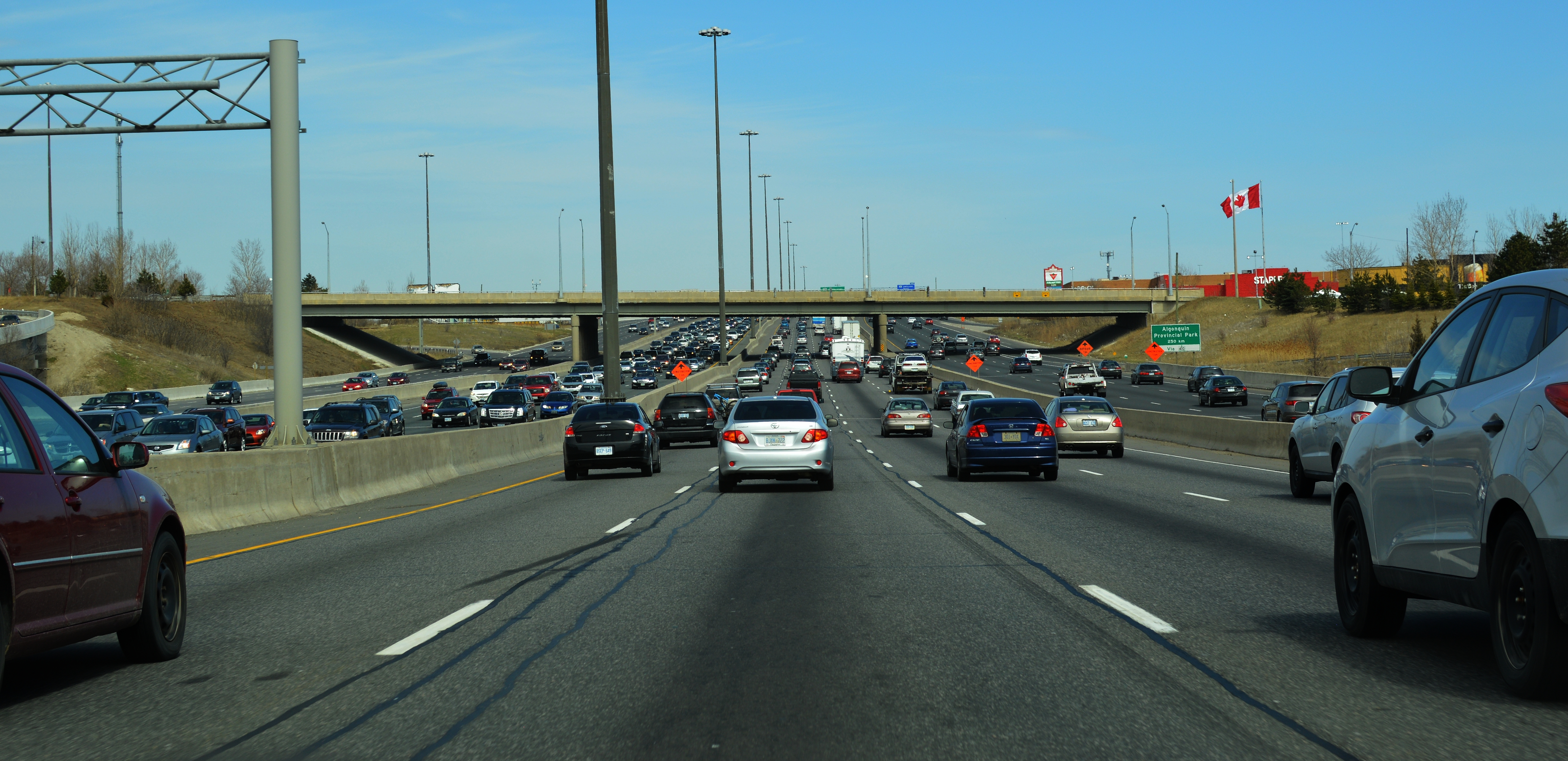
Highway 401 eastbound express lanes at Weston Road. This section has a volume of over 500,000 vehicles per day during the summer months.

=== Greater Toronto Area ===
As Highway 401 approaches the Greater Toronto Area (GTA) from the west, it rounds Rattlesnake Point (part of the ecologically protected Niagara Escarpment) to the west of Milton. Upon entering the town, it enters the first urbanized section of the GTA, passing through two rural areas between there and Oshawa. Part of this rural gap is the western side of Toronto's Greenbelt, a zone around Toronto protected from development and part of the Golden Horseshoe. After this 10-kilometre (6.2 mi) gap, the highway interchanges with the Highway 407 Express Toll Route (407 ETR). Within the GTA, the highway passes several major shopping malls including Toronto Premium Outlets, Yorkdale Shopping Centre, Scarborough Town Centre, and Pickering Town Centre.

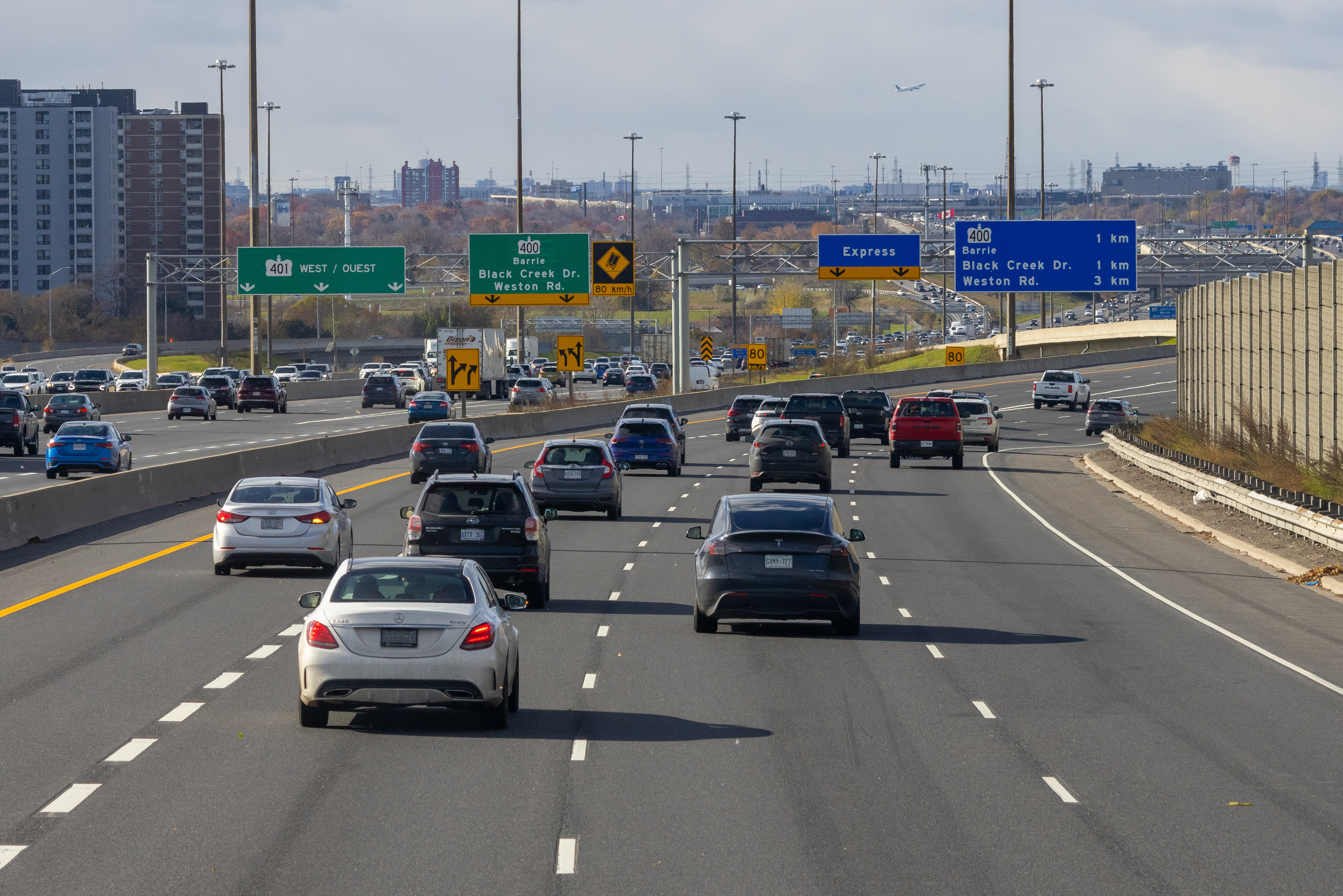
Different colours are used on the signs on Highway 401's collector-express system to avoid confusion. The express lanes use green signs and the collector lanes use blue.

Within Greater Toronto, three separate segments of Highway 401 employ a collector-express system, a concept inspired by the Dan Ryan Expressway in Chicago. The system divides each direction of travel into segregated collector and express lanes, giving the highway a wide span and four carriageways. Unlike the collector lanes, which provide access to every interchange, the express lanes only provide direct access to a select few interchanges. Access between the two is provided by transfers, which are strategically placed to prevent disruptions caused by closely spaced interchanges. To avoid confusion between carriageways, blue signs are used for the collector lanes and green signs for the express lanes. The overall purpose of the collector-express system is to maximize traffic flow for both local and long-distance traffic.

From the west, the first collector-express section through the Greater Toronto Area is 4.6 kilometres (2.9 mi) long, and runs from James Snow Parkway to Highway 407.

The highway briefly narrows to 10 lanes between the interchanges with Highway 407 and Winston Churchill Boulevard (Peel Regional Road 19), then the second collector-express system begins and runs 16.7 kilometres (10.4 mi) to Highway 427. The west end of the highway's section initially terminated just west of Highway 410/403 in the early 1990s. However, it was extended westward in stages during the 2010s to include the interchanges with Hurontario Street, Mavis Road, and Mississauga Road (Peel Regional Road 1); with the final extension to Winston Churchill Boulevard (and to Milton) being completed in 2022. Because Highway 403's eastern terminus feeds into the easternmost segment of the freeway's second collector-express section, this results in the Highway reaching its widest point, at 18 lanes. Running south of Toronto Pearson International Airport, the close proximity to the runways necessitates conventional light poles instead of high-mast lighting.

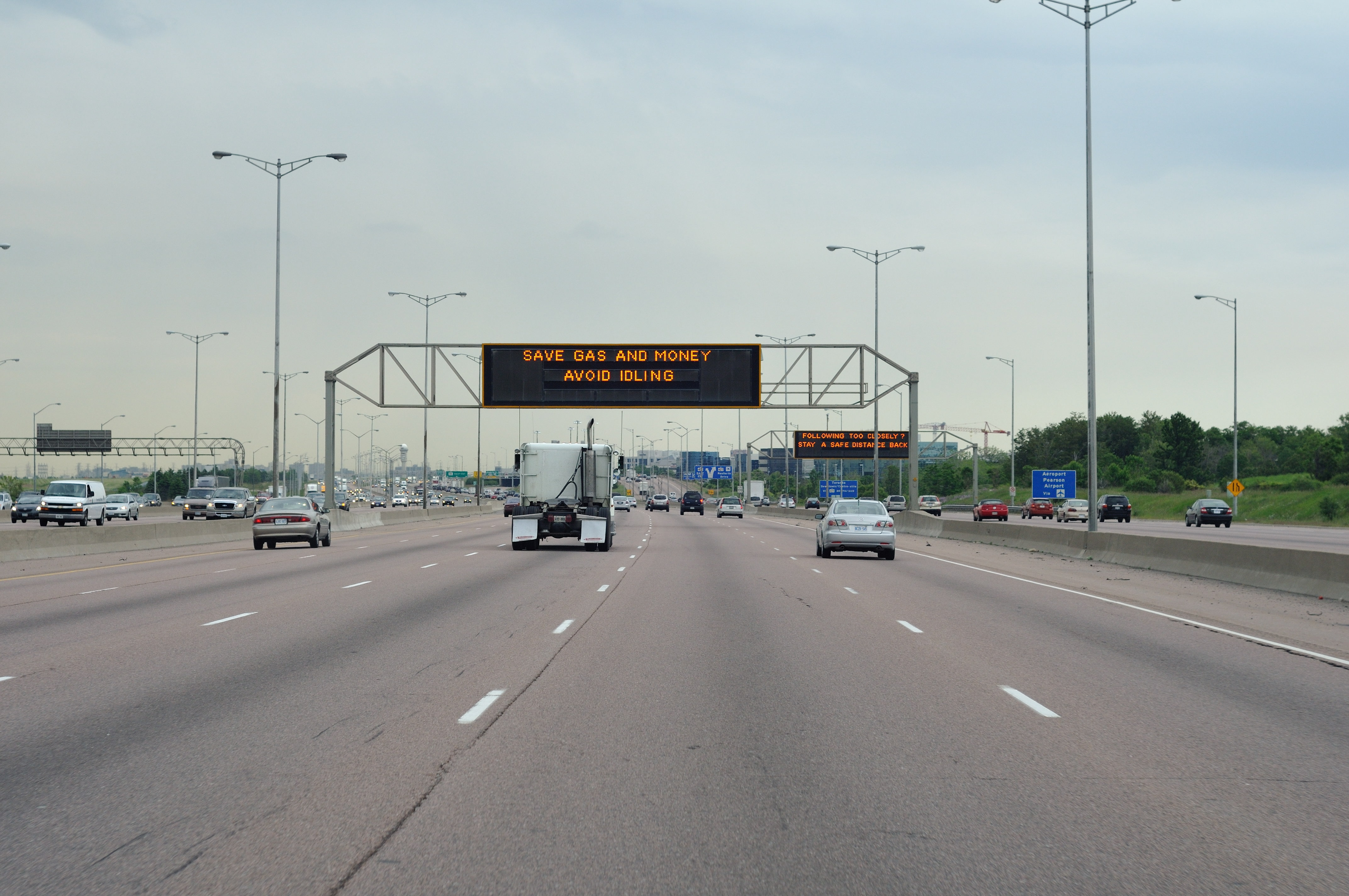
At the freeway's widest point in Mississauga near Toronto Pearson Airport, on the eastbound express lanes approaching the Airport Basketweave

Approaching the City of Toronto's western border, a final transfer (known as the "Airport Basketweave") allows eastbound traffic in the collector lanes to transfer to Highway 401 express lanes which continue under Highway 427 as the single eastbound Highway 401 carriageway. The Highway 401 collector lanes become ramps to Highway 427 after a final exit at Renforth Drive and crossing into Toronto. For westbound traffic, the Highway's single westbound carriageway becomes the Highway 401 express lanes. The exit ramps from Highway 427 merge to form the start of the westbound Highway 401 collector lanes in this section. The collector lanes were originally designed to accommodate and organize various traffic movements from the Highway 403 / Highway 410 and Highway 427 interchanges along Highway 401, replacing an earlier plan that would have run Highway 403 directly to Eglinton Avenue and the never-built Richview Expressway.

East of the spaghetti interchange with Highway 427, the single carriageway of Highway 401 curves northeast and follows a hydro corridor to the east end of Highway 409. The space constraints of the existing flyovers at the 401/427 interchange also limit the width of Highway 401 through this junction to eight lanes (widened from the original six), making it a traffic bottleneck. Due to ramps from Highway 427's southernmost segment (between Highway 401 and the QEW) feeding in, this five-kilometre (3.1 mi) section of Highway 401 between Highways 427 and 409 is six lanes per direction (five lanes through the interchange with Dixon Road and Martin Grove Road), with no express/collector split. Highway 409 is a short freeway used mainly as a spur route for traffic travelling to the airport or Highway 427 northbound from 401 westbound (and vice versa), as these route movements are not accommodated at the junction between 401 and 427.

At the terminus of Highway 409, where the ramps merge into Highway 401, 401 returns to its east–west direction through Toronto. This is also the west end of the third, final, and longest collector-express segment (43.7 kilometres or 27.2 miles), which crosses the rest of Toronto to Brock Road in Pickering in the east. An average of 442,900 vehicles pass between Weston Road and Highway 400 (Toronto–Barrie Highway) per day as of 2008, making this segment of the 401 in Toronto the busiest freeway in the world. In spite of this congestion, it is the primary commuting route in Toronto, and over 50 percent of vehicles bound for downtown Toronto use the highway. The four-way junction with Highway 400 has flyover ramps that favour traffic north of that interchange, as south of that interchange, 400 has an exit to Jane Street before the route continues further south as the municipal expressway, Black Creek Drive. Between the interchanges with Highway 400 and Keele Street is a set of transfer ramps between the express and collector lanes nicknamed "The Basketweave", as each direction has a pair of ramps that cross over and under each other.

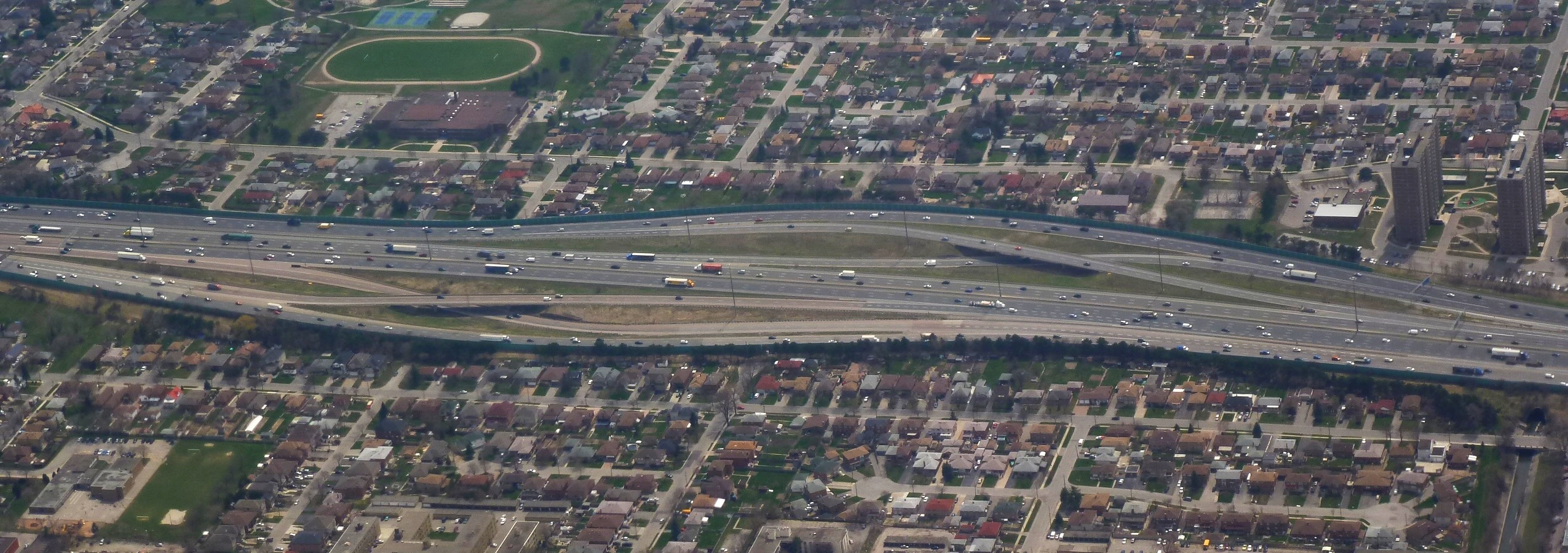
"The Basketweave", just east of the Highway 400 interchange, is a free-flowing crossover between the collector and express lanes.

Passing between Downsview Airport (decommissioned as of April 2024) and Yorkdale Shopping Centre, access for Highway 401 motorists west of Dufferin Street is provided by the latter's partial interchange. Access to Yorkdale for motorists to/from Highway 401 east of Allen Road (a short municipal expressway) is provided by the latter's complicated turbine/combination interchange. Between Avenue Road and Yonge Street, Highway 401 crosses North America's busiest multi-structure bridge at Hogg's Hollow. The four bridges, two for each direction with the collector and express lanes, carried an average of 360,300 vehicles daily in 2019. After passing south of North York City Centre and Bayview Village, the freeway descends as it approaches an interchange with Leslie Street, which provides an exit/entry for North York General Hospital (NYGH) and Oriole GO Station; the Concord Park Place condo buildings are north of the highway. East of the Leslie Street Interchange, Highway 401 ascends as it crosses the Don River and approaches the major junction with Highway 404 and the Don Valley Parkway (DVP).

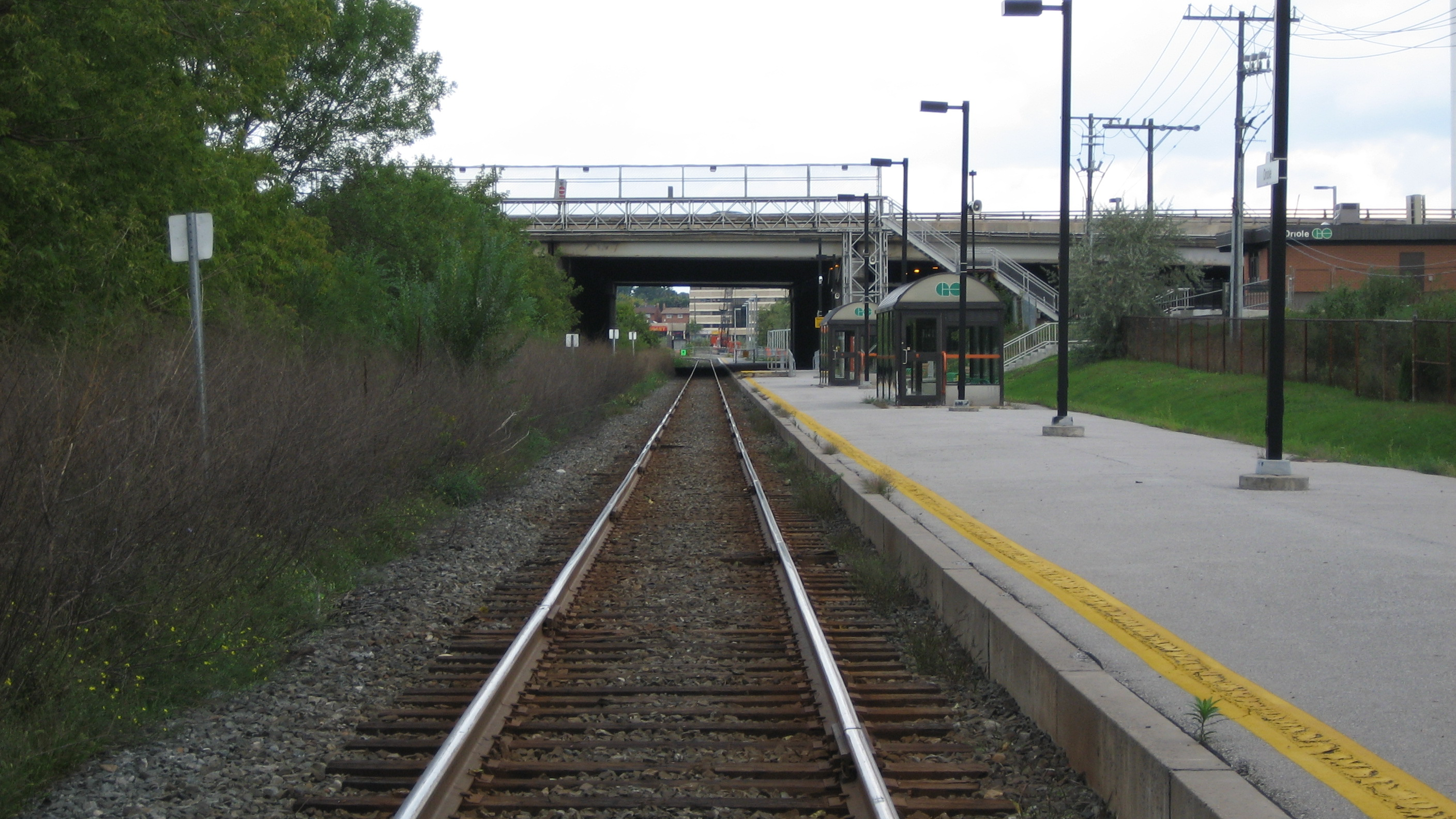
Oriole GO Station looking north at Highway 401.

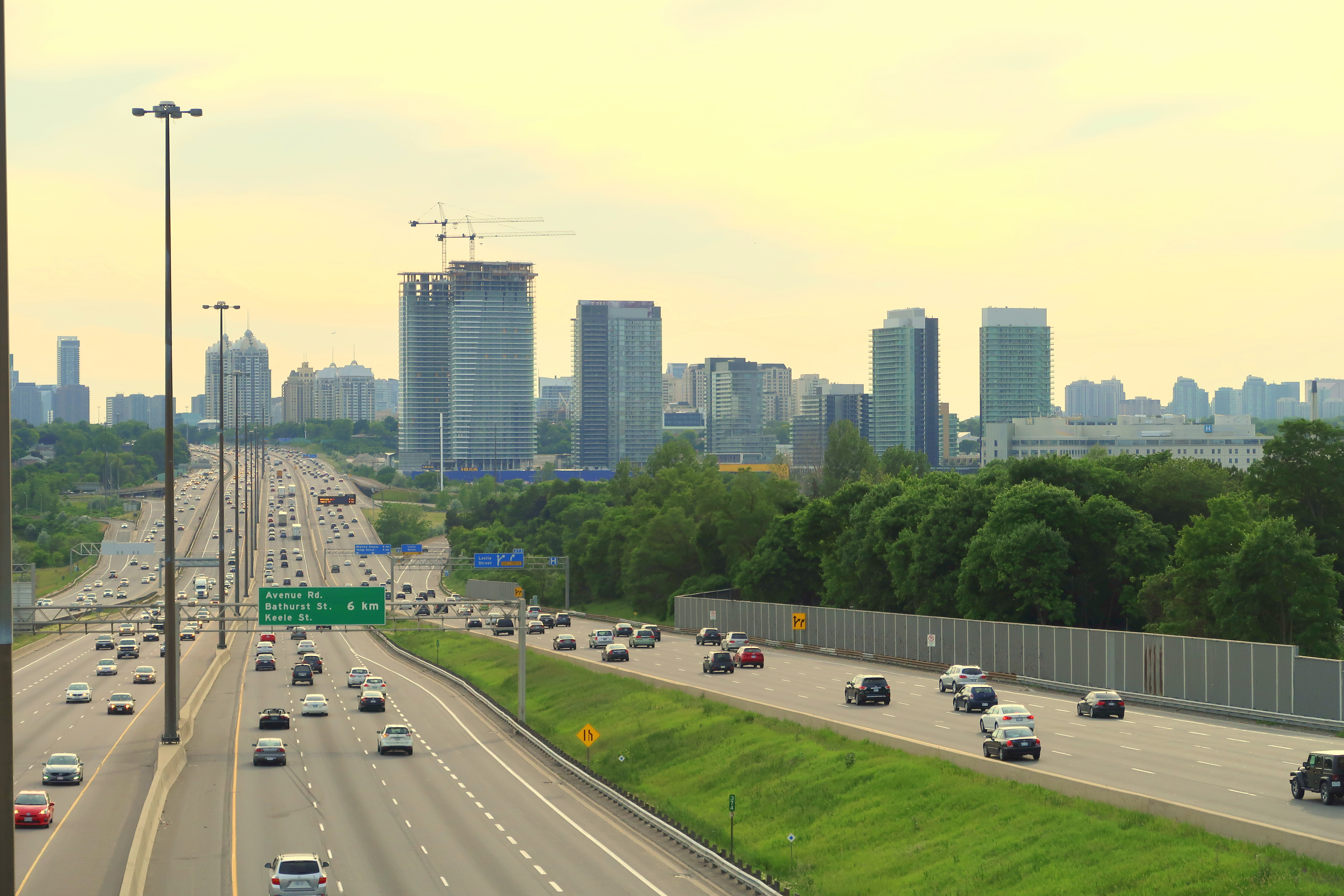
Highway 401 looking west from Don Mills Road overpass, with the Concord Park Place condo development and North York General Hospital in the background.

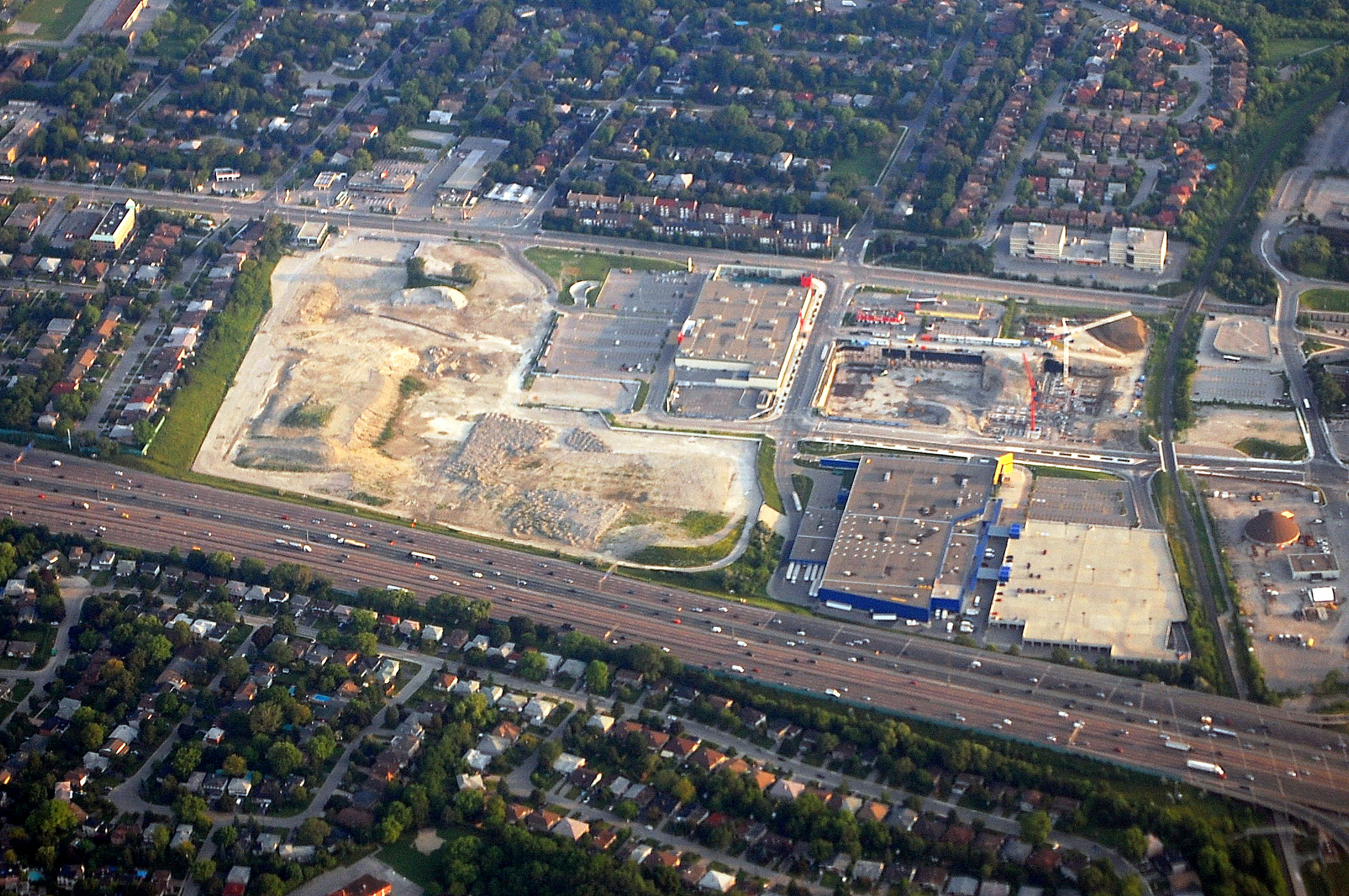
Highway 401 just west of Leslie Street

Between Birchmount Road and Midland Avenue, Highway 401 is elevated on a berm as it crosses three surface streets and two railway lines. Progressing eastward in Scarborough, the highway continues through mostly residential areas and Scarborough City Centre including the shopping mall, Scarborough Town Centre. At the northwest corner of the interchange with McCowan Road is a Bell Media/CTV studio complex and CTV Television Network's studio office, 9 Channel Nine Court. Highway 401 eventually reaches Toronto's eastern edge where at Meadowvale Road, it turns southeast briefly before crossing Kingston Road as it swings northeast as Highway 2A (downloaded from the province to the municipality in 1998) merges into it, followed immediately by an interchange with Port Union Road/Sheppard Avenue, then crossing the Rouge Valley into Pickering and Durham Region.

West of Pickering, Highway 401 again meets former Highway 2, which thereafter parallels it to the Ontario–Quebec border. East of Toronto, as the highway approaches an interchange with Brock Road (Durham Regional Road 1), the collector and express lanes converge, narrowing the 14-lane freeway to 10, divided only at the centre. It remains this width as it passes into Ajax, before narrowing back to six lanes at Salem Road (Durham Regional Road 41). Planned expansions east of Salem to improve flow leading into the Highway 412 (West Durham Link) and Lakeridge Road (Lake Ridge Road) (Durham Regional Road 23) interchanges will see the highway widened to ten lanes as far as Brock Street in Whitby, where the existing interchange will be reconfigured.

East of Ajax, the highway passes through the second 3.5-kilometre (2.2 mi) rural gap, and enters Whitby. The stretch of Highway 401 through Whitby and Oshawa features several structures completed during the initial construction of the highway in the 1940s. Several of these structures are to be demolished, either due to their age, or to prepare for the planned widening of Highway 401 through this area. A former Canadian National Railway overpass, which was fenced off but commonly used by pedestrians during Highway of Heroes repatriations, was demolished on the night of June 11, 2011. A second structure in Bowmanville was demolished during two overnight closures on July 9 and 16. At Harmony Road (Durham Regional Road 33), the suburban surroundings quickly transition to agricultural land, and Highway 401 finally exits the urban GTA. Encountering another hydro corridor, the highway curves around the south side of Bowmanville, then travels towards Highway 35 and Highway 115.

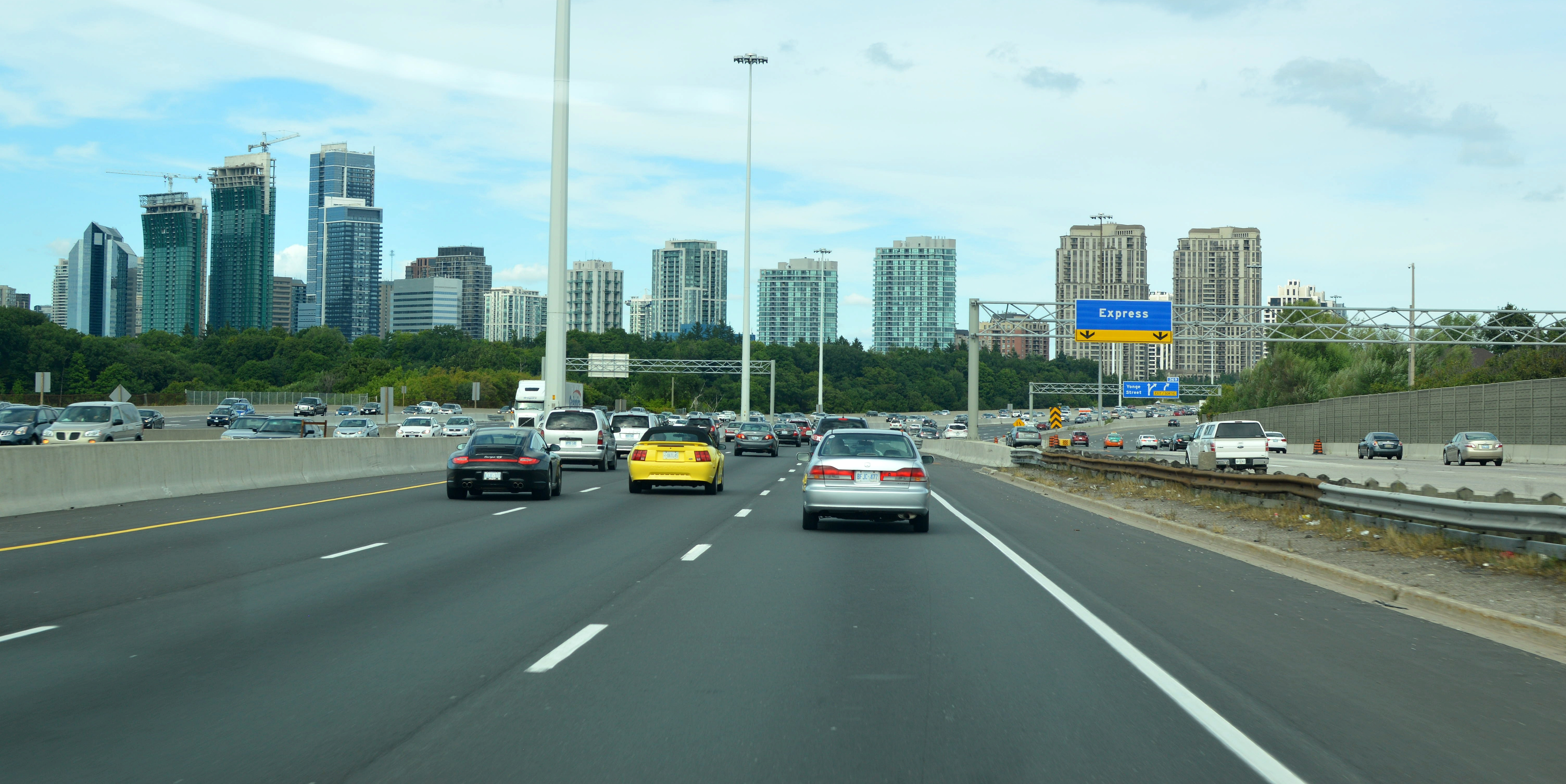
Highway 401 looking east between Avenue Road and Yonge Street; the North York skyline is visible in the distance.

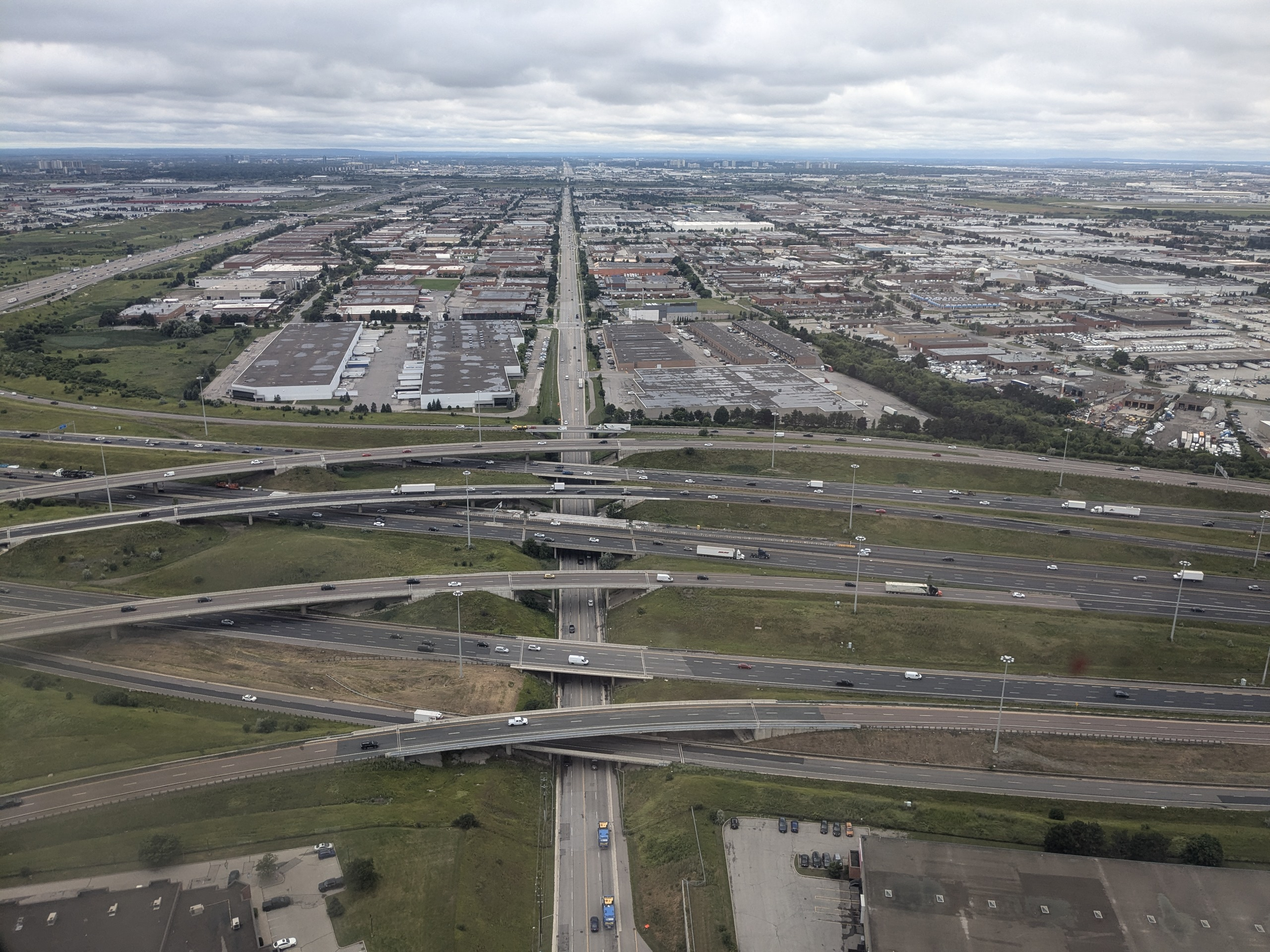
Highway 401 at the interchange with Highway 410 and Highway 403 in Mississauga.

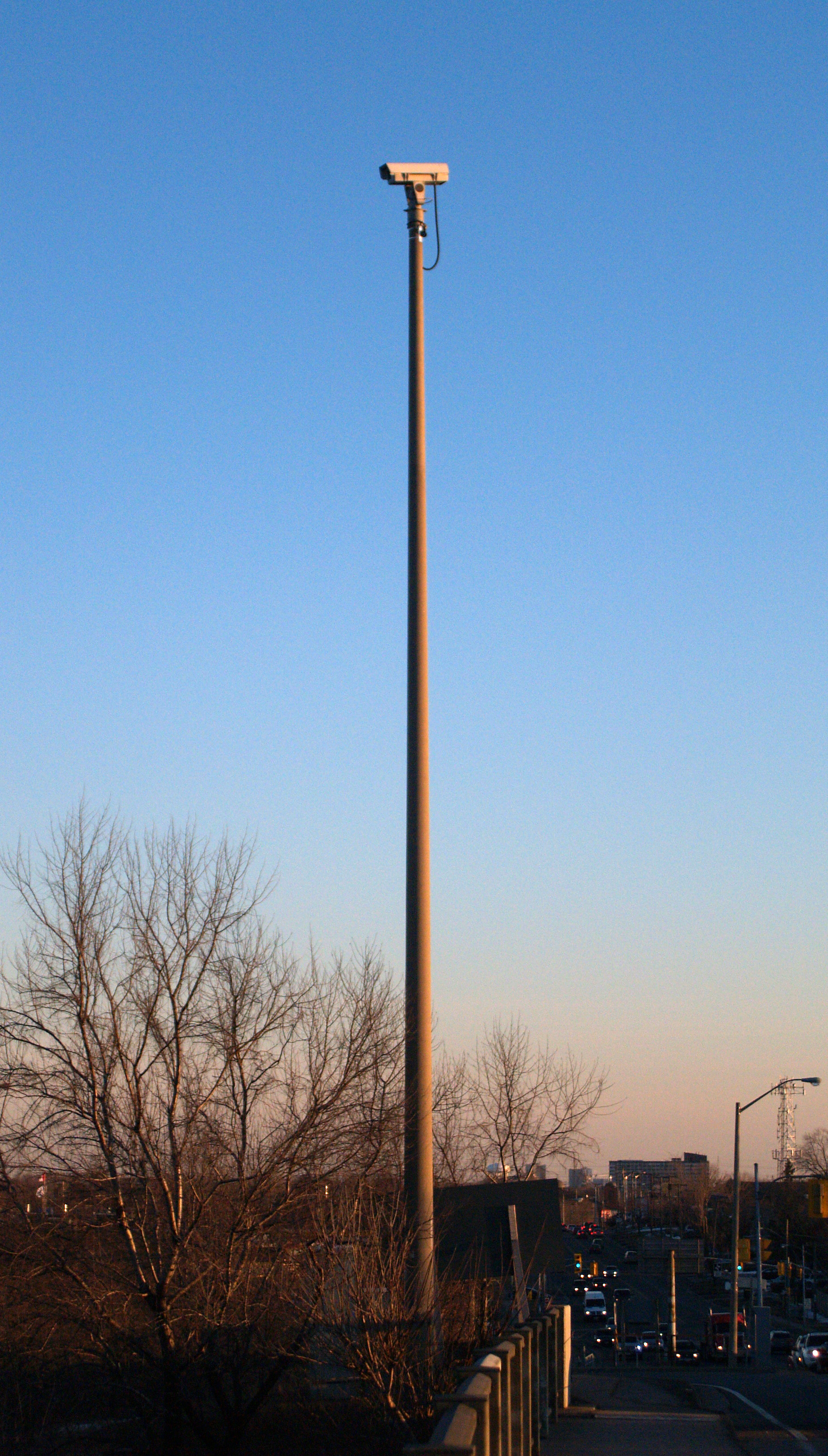
Traffic cameras are mounted at every exit within Toronto and form one part of the COMPASS system.

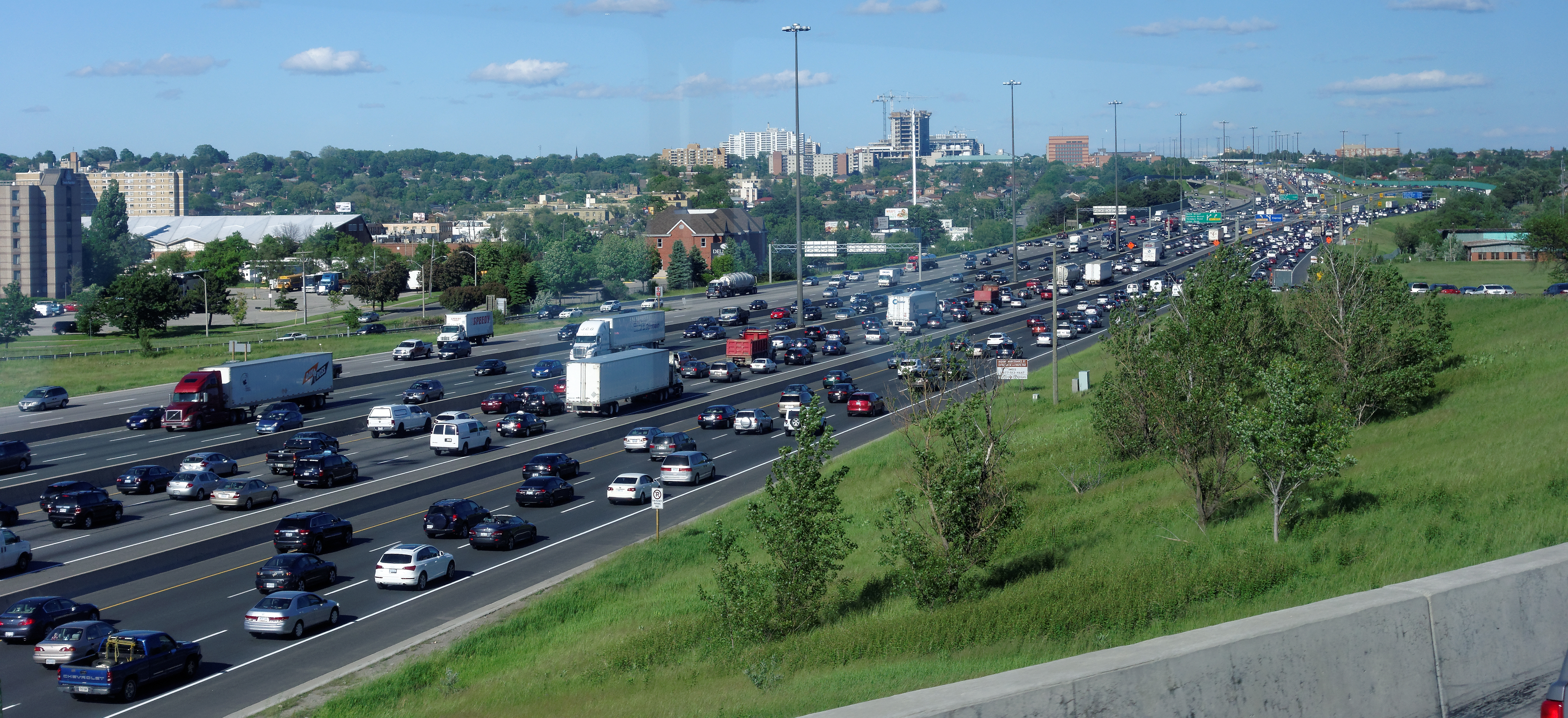
The collector-express system just east of the Highway 400 interchange, with "The Basketweave" transfers between them in the background.

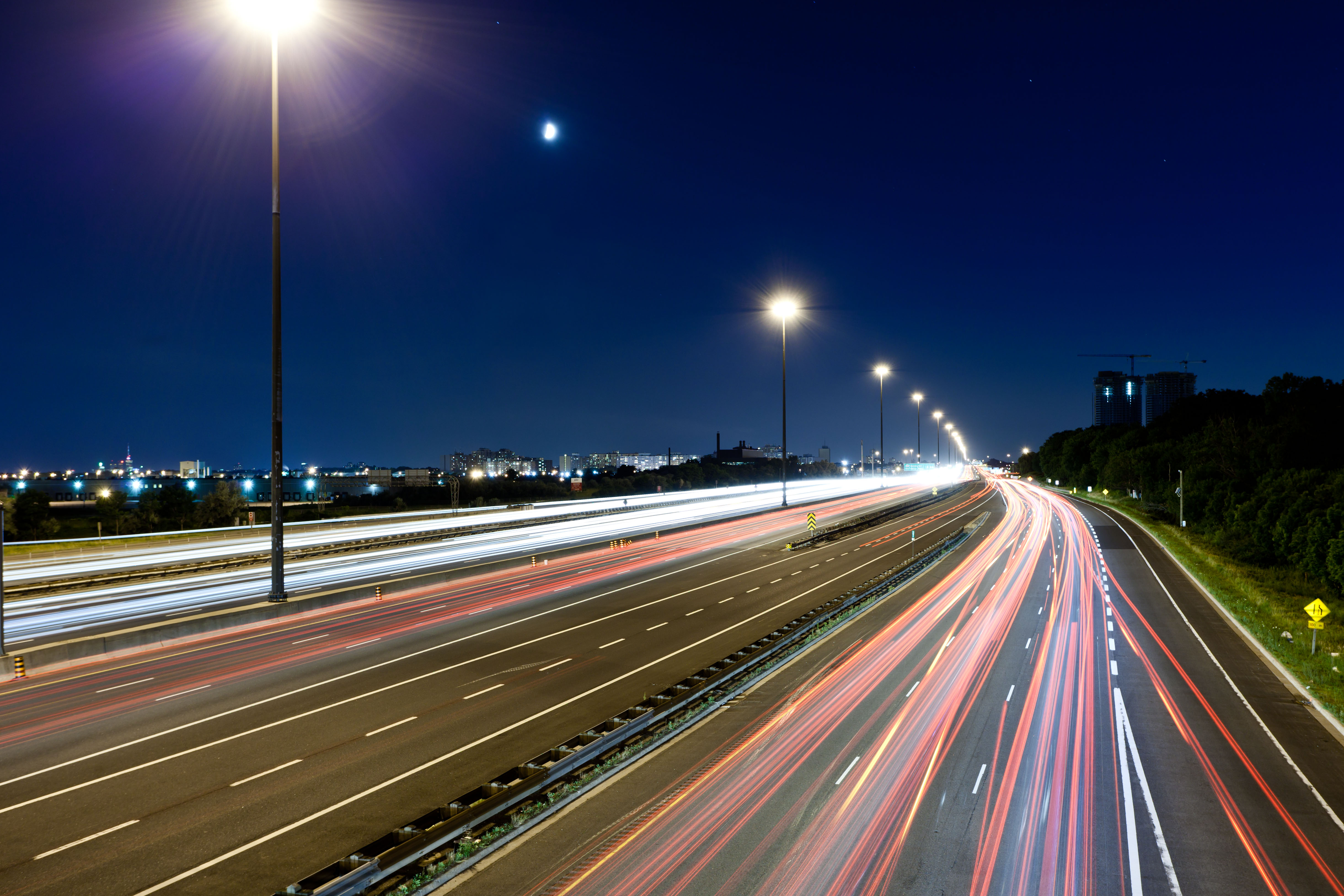
Express to collector transfer.

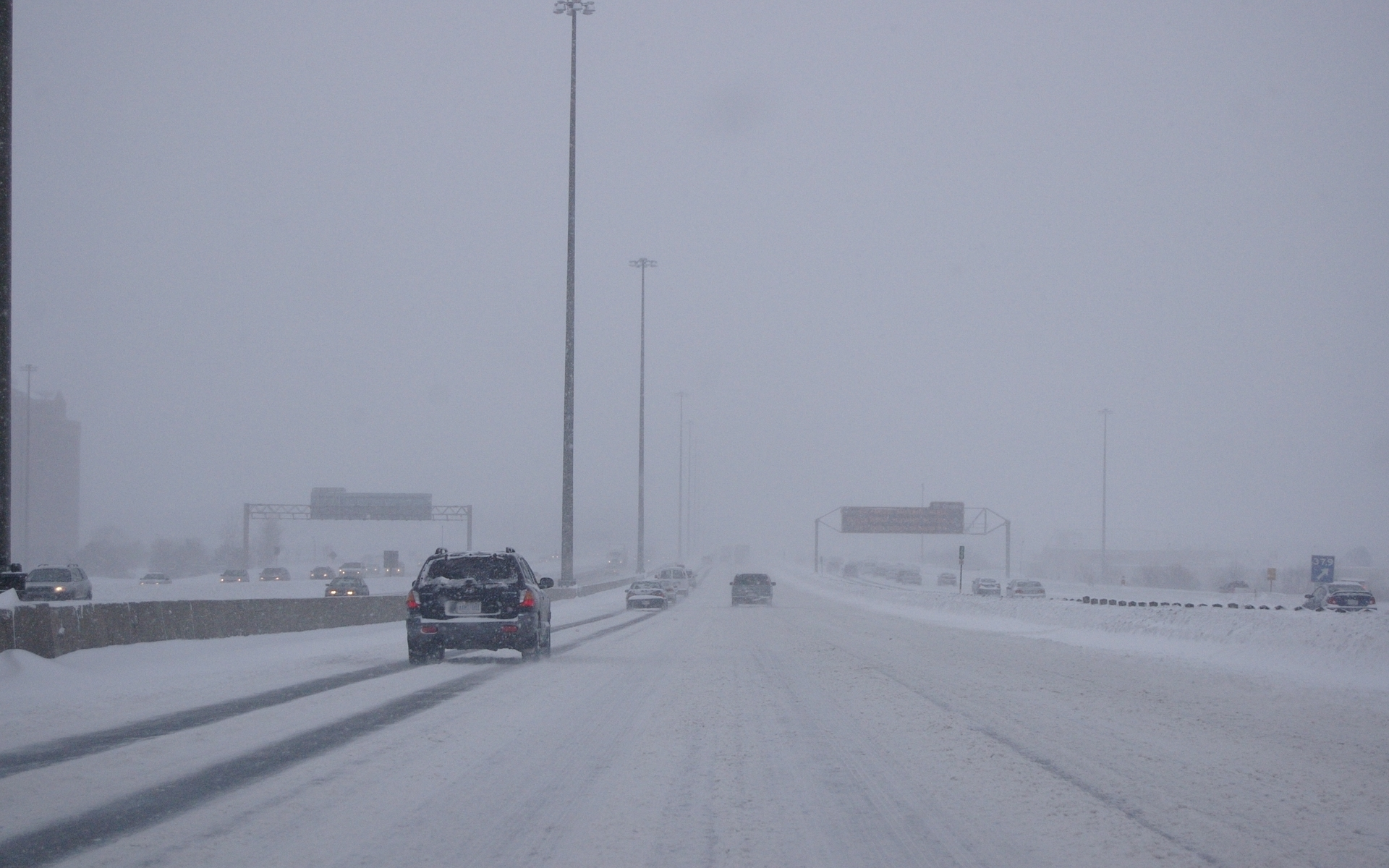
Winter conditions on Highway 401 in Toronto due to a snowsquall.

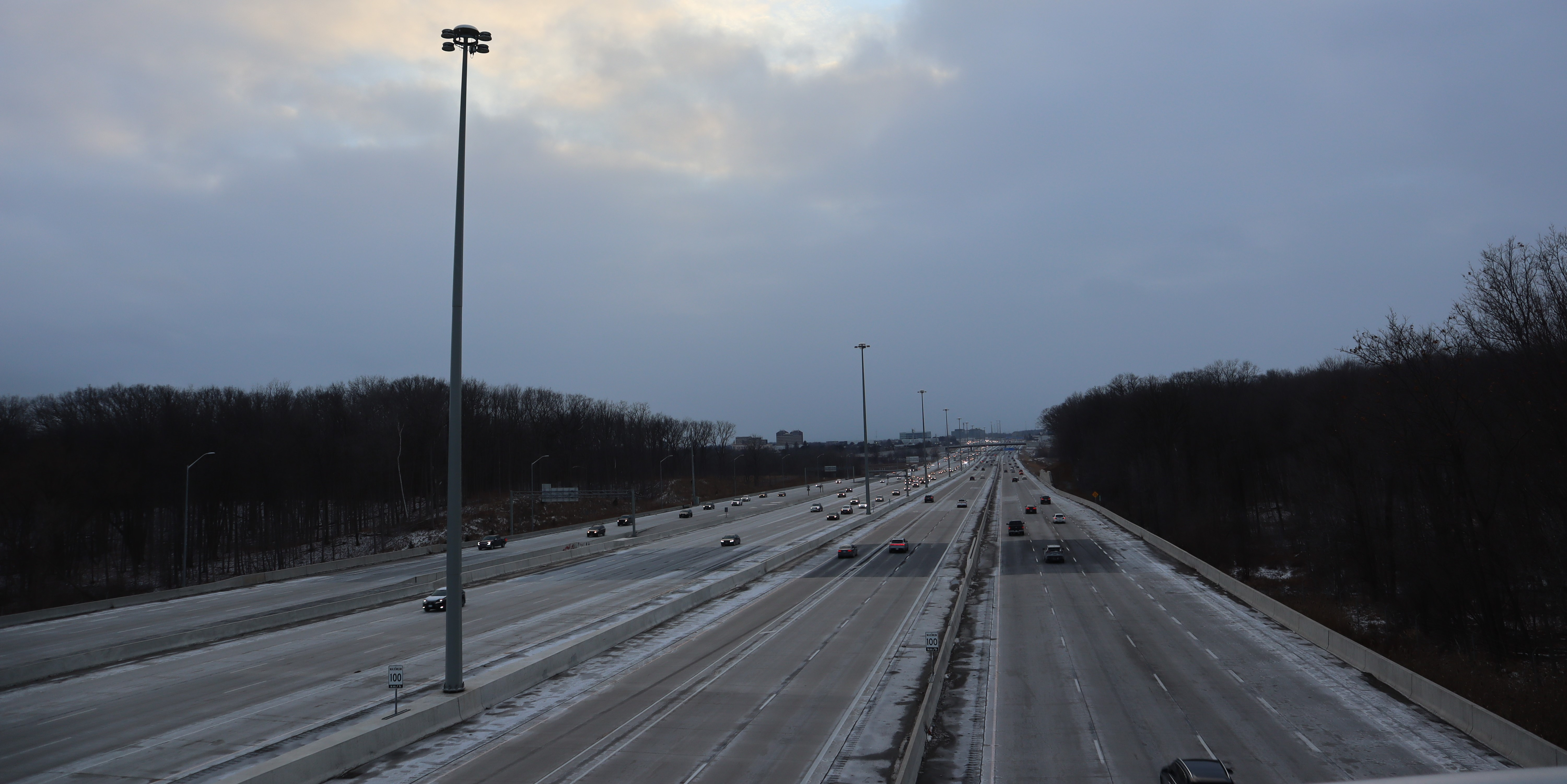
Newly opened in 2022, the collector-express system in Mississauga is viewed from the pedestrian bridge that replaced the original road bridge carrying Second Line West.

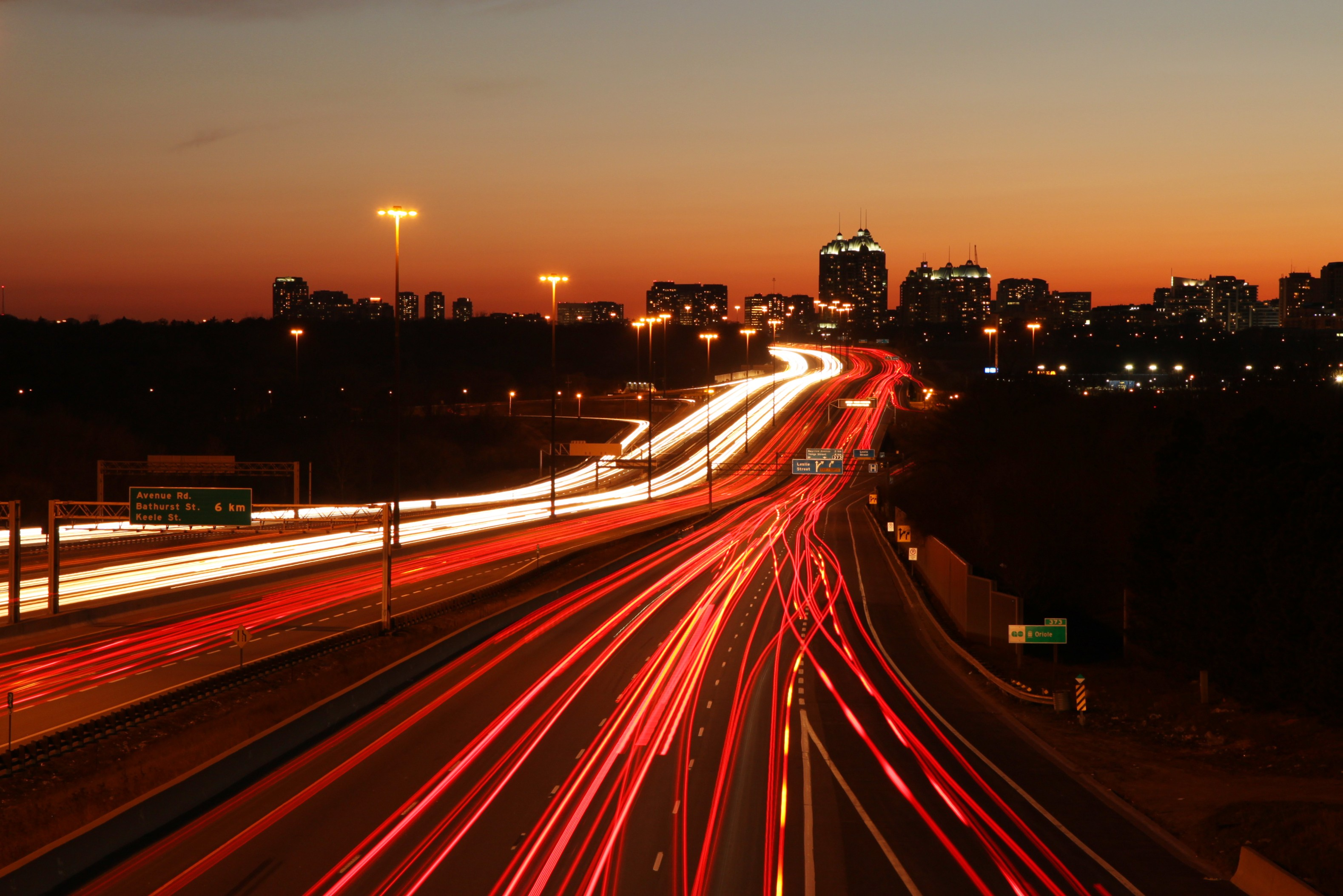
Highway 401 west of the Don Valley Parkway at dusk.

=== Eastern Ontario ===
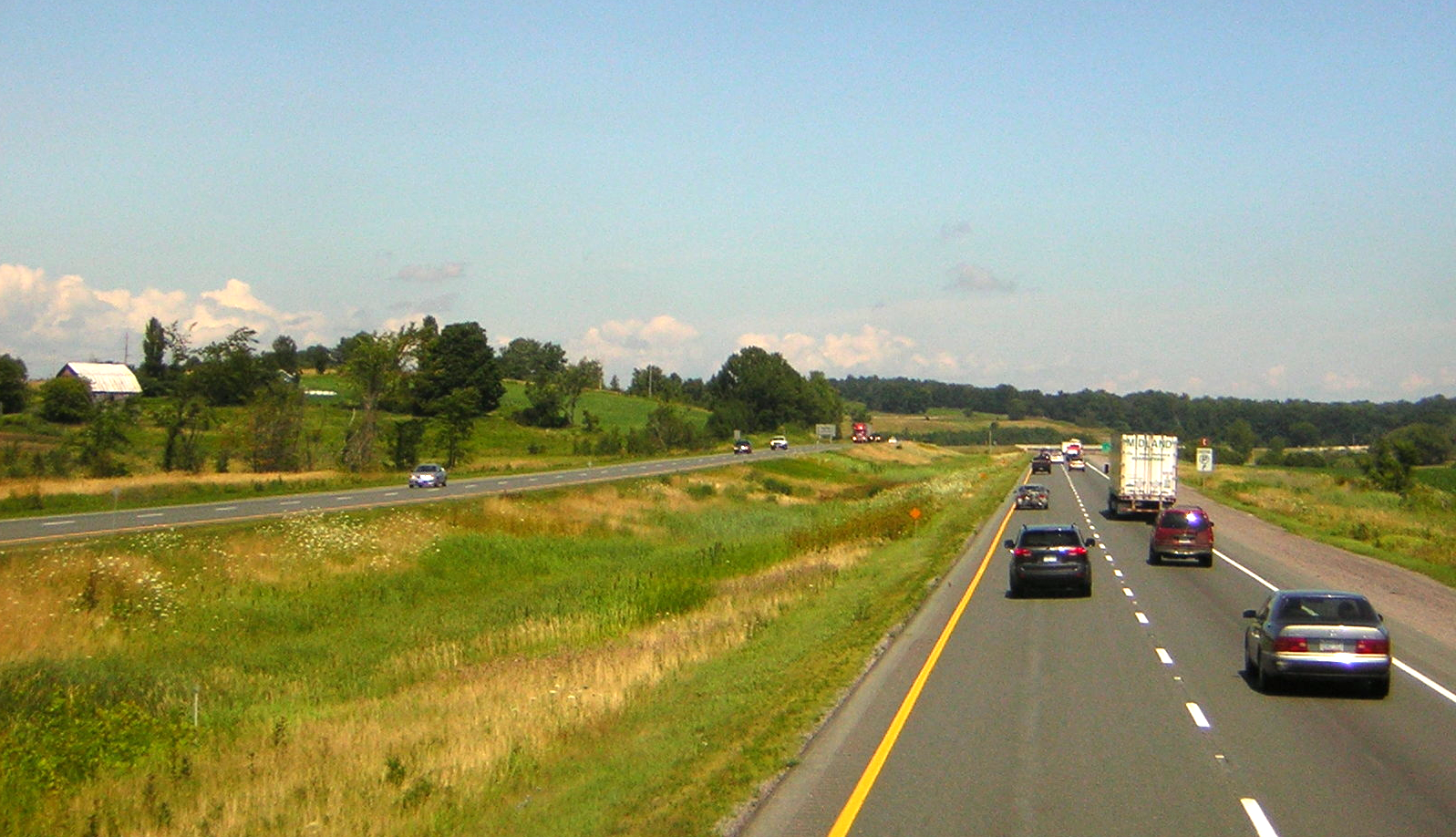
Through much of eastern Ontario, Highway 401 is a rural freeway with a grass median.

From east of the interchange with Highway 35 and Highway 115 to Cobourg, the 401 passes through a mix of agricultural lands and forests, maintaining a straight course. After exiting Greater Toronto, the freeway passes through the north end of the towns of Port Hope and Cobourg with two interchanges each. Just east of Cobourg, the highway narrows to four lanes and the terrain becomes undulating, with the highway routed around hills and through valleys along the shores of Lake Ontario. At Trenton, the highway crosses the Trent Canal and returns to an agricultural setting. The highway then crosses the Moira River as it goes through Belleville, before passing through Greater Napanee, then heading eastward to Kingston. The Kingston portion of the highway, originally named the "Kingston-Bypass", was one of the first sections of the highway to be completed; it is now mostly three lanes each way.

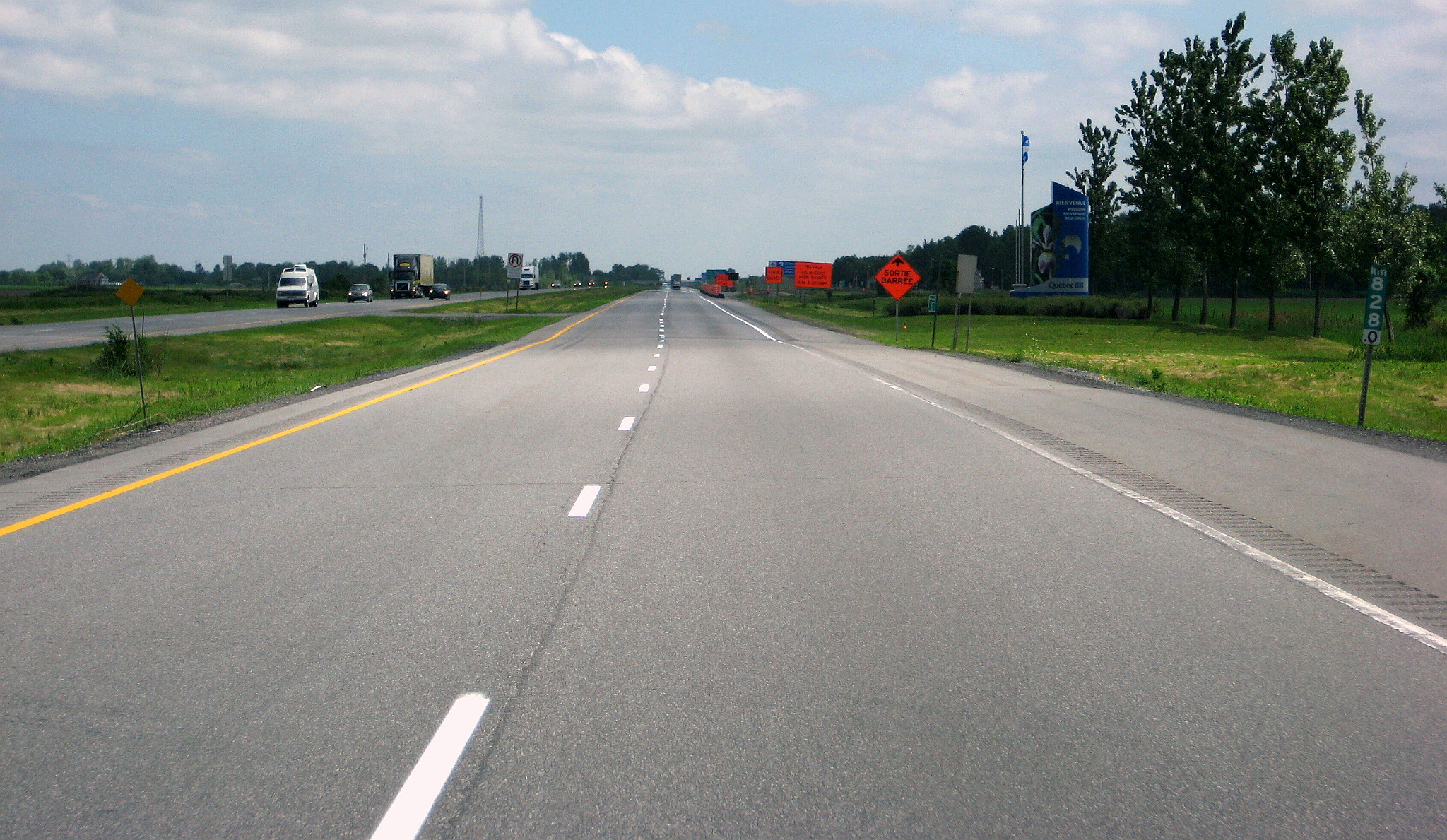
Highway 401 ends at the Quebec boundary, where Autoroute 20 continues towards Montreal, Quebec City, and the Maritime Provinces.

East of Kingston, the highway continues through a predominantly agricultural area alongside the St. Lawrence River to Gananoque, where it splits with the Thousand Islands Parkway ("Scenic Highway"), one of the original sections of the highway designated in 1952. The highway runs parallel to the parkway several kilometres inland from the river. The Canadian Shield, an ancient geological formation and shield, appears through this heavily forested section of the highway. Highway 401 rejoins the Thousand Islands Parkway immediately southwest of Brockville, now heading northeast.

The remainder of the highway runs parallel to the former Highway 2 along the shore of the St. Lawrence River within the St. Lawrence Valley. Northeast of Brockville is the interchange with Highway 416, which heads north to Ottawa. The freeway passes through Johnstown, Cardinal, Iroquois, Morrisburg, Ingleside, Long Sault, Cornwall, and the last towns of Lancaster and South Lancaster. At the Ontario–Quebec boundary, Highway 401 becomes Quebec's Autoroute 20, which continues to Montreal.

=== Traffic volume ===
The MTO publishes yearly traffic volume data for provincial highways, expressed as an average daily vehicle count over the span of a year (AADT). The table below compares the AADT at several locations along Highway 401 using data from 1969, 1988, 2008, 2016, and 2021.

Average annual daily traffic counts of selected sections of Highway 401 over 52 years
Location	Section	Traffic volume (AADT)				
Location	Section	1969	1988	2008	2016	2021
Windsor	Dougall Parkway – Essex County Road 46	9,550	13,200	16,700	17,500	17,900
London	Highbury Avenue – Veterans Memorial Parkway	17,450	33,800	64,500	64,200	75,200
Woodstock	Oxford County Road 59 – Highway 403	16,700	35,100	67,100	67,500	72,400
Cambridge	Highway 8 – Highway 24	19,900	50,400	125,600	137,300	155,200
Mississauga	Mississauga Road – Hurontario Street	28,450	97,100	177,300	216,500	241,000
Toronto	Weston Road – Highway 400	106,850	319,600	442,900	416,500	424,600
Oshawa	Stevenson Road – Simcoe Street	29,000	79,000	120,700	134,200	143,400
Belleville	Highway 62 – Highway 37	13,750	22,500	43,500	45,300	48,800
Kingston	Frontenac County Road 38 – Sydenham Road	12,000	20,700	45,400	55,000	61,000
Brockville	Highway 29 – North Augusta Road	10,050	15,300	29,100	33,600	37,400
Cornwall	Highway 138 – McConnell Avenue	10,300	12,900	18,400	21,400	23,100

Number of through lanes on Highway 401 (excludes ongoing or planned widening projects)
Location	Lane count	Distance
E C Row Expressway to Essex County Road 42	6 lanes	55.7 km (34.6 mi)
Essex County Road 42 to Highway 402	4 lanes	127.5 km (79.2 mi)
Highway 402 to Highway 8	6 lanes	94.6 km (58.8 mi)
Highway 8 to Highway 24 (Hespeler Road)	12 lanes	3.0 km (1.9 mi)
Highway 24 (Hespeler Road) to Townline Road	10 lanes	3.8 km (2.4 mi)
Townline Road to Halton Regional Road 25	6 lanes	33.3 km (20.7 mi)
Halton Regional Road 25 to James Snow Parkway	10 lanes	4.3 km (2.7 mi)
James Snow Parkway to Highway 407	12-lane collector-express system	5.3 km (3.3 mi)
Highway 407 to Winston Churchill Boulevard	10 lanes	3.3 km (2.1 mi)
Winston Churchill Boulevard to Highway 403 / 410	12-lane collector-express system	10.5 km (6.5 mi)
Highway 403 / 410 to Highway 427	18-lane collector-express system	5.8 km (3.6 mi)
Highway 427 to Highway 27	8 lanes	0.8 km (0.50 mi)
Highway 27 to Highway 409	10 lanes	3.9 km (2.4 mi)
Highway 409 to Brock Road	12–16-lane collector-express system	43.3 km (26.9 mi)
Brock Road to Salem Road	10 lanes	6.0 km (3.7 mi)
Salem Road to 4.5 km east of Baltimore Road	6 lanes	74.8 km (46.5 mi)
4.5 km east of Baltimore Road to Frontenac County Road 38	4 lanes	131.7 km (81.8 mi)
Frontenac County Road 38 to Highway 15	6 lanes	12.2 km (7.6 mi)
Highway 15 to ON–QC border	4 lanes	205.0 km (127.4 mi)

== History ==
=== Predecessors ===
Highway 401 colour-coded by the year each section opened to traffic.

Highway 401's history predates its designation by over two decades. As automobile use in southern Ontario grew in the early 20th century, road design and construction advanced significantly. Following frequent erosion of Lake Shore Road, then macadamized, a concrete road known as the Toronto–Hamilton Highway was proposed in January 1914. Construction began on November 8 of that year, following the onset of World War I. The highway was designed to run along the lake shore, instead of Dundas Street to the north, because the numerous hills encountered along Dundas would have increased costs without improving accessibility. Middle Road, a dirt lane named because of its position between the two, was not considered since Lake Shore and Dundas were both overcrowded and in need of serious repairs. The road was formally opened on November 24, 1917, 5.5 m (18 ft) wide and nearly 64 km (40 mi) long. It was the first concrete road in Ontario, as well as one of the longest stretches of concrete road between two cities in the world.

Over the next decade, vehicle usage increased substantially, and by 1920, Lakeshore Road was again congested, particularly during weekends. In response, the Department of Highways examined improving another road between Toronto and Hamilton. The road was to be more than twice the width of Lakeshore Road at 12 m (39 ft) and would carry two lanes of traffic in either direction. Construction on what was then known as the Queen Street Extension west of Toronto began in early 1931.

Before the highway could be completed, Thomas McQuesten was appointed the new minister of the Department of Highways, with Robert Melville Smith as deputy minister, following the 1934 provincial elections. Smith, inspired by the German autobahns—new "dual-lane divided highways"—modified the design for Ontario roads, and McQuesten ordered the Middle Road be converted into this new form of highway. A 40-metre (130 ft) right-of-way was purchased along the Middle Road and construction began to convert the existing sections to a divided highway. Work also began on Canada's first interchange at Highway 10.

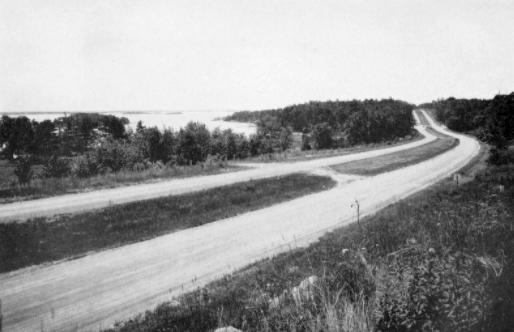
Finished grading of the Thousand Islands Parkway (Highway 2S) in 1944

Beginning in 1935, McQuesten applied the concept of a dual-highway to several projects along Highway 2, including along Kingston Road in Scarborough Township. When widening in Scarborough reached the Highland Creek ravine in 1936, the Department of Highways began construction on a new bridge over the large valley, bypassing the former alignment around West Hill. From here the highway was constructed on a new alignment to Oshawa, avoiding construction on the congested Highway 2. As grading and bridge construction neared completion on the new highway between West Hill and Oshawa in September 1939, World War II broke out and gradually tax revenues were re-allocated from highway construction to the war effort. At the same time, between September 6 and 8, 1939, the Ontario Good Roads Association Conference was held at Bigwin Inn, near Huntsville, drawing highway engineers from across North America to discuss the new concept of "Dual Highways". On the first day of the convention, McQuesten announced his vision of the freeway: an uninterrupted drive through the scenic regions of Ontario, discouraging local business and local traffic from accessing the highway except at infrequent controlled-access points. It was announced in the days thereafter this concept would be applied to a new "trans-provincial expressway", running from Windsor to the Ontario–Quebec border.

Highway engineers evaluated factors such as grading, curve radius, and the narrow median used along the Middle Road—which was inaugurated on August 23, 1940, as the Queen Elizabeth Way (QEW)—and began to plan the course of a new dual highway mostly parallel to Highway 2, with precedence given to areas most hampered by congestion. Unlike the QEW, this highway would not be built along an existing road, but rather on a new right-of-way, avoiding the need to provide access to properties. Along with immense improvements to machinery and construction techniques over its six-year course, the war provided planners an opportunity to conduct a survey of 375,000 drivers, asking them about their preferred route to travel to their destination. Using this information, a course was plotted from Windsor to Quebec, bypassing all towns along the way.

Highway 2S (S for Scenic) was the first completed section of new roadway. Built to connect with the Thousand Islands Bridge at Ivy Lea and opened as a gravel road in late 1941 or early 1942, the road followed the shore of the Saint Lawrence River and connected with the western end of the twinned Highway 2 near Brockville. In addition, the highway between Highland Creek and Oshawa was opened as a gravel-surfaced road in May 1942.

Following the war, construction resumed on roadways throughout Ontario. The expressway between Highland Creek and Oshawa was completed in December 1947 and designated as Highway 2A, while other sections languished. The Toronto–Barrie Highway was the primary focus of the Department of Highways at the time, and the onset of the Korean War in 1950 stalled construction again. Despite the delays, highway minister George Doucett officially announced the plans for construction of the new trans-provincial expressway that year, with the Toronto to Oshawa expressway serving as a model for the design. Work on the most important link, the Toronto Bypass, began in 1951, but it would not open with that name.

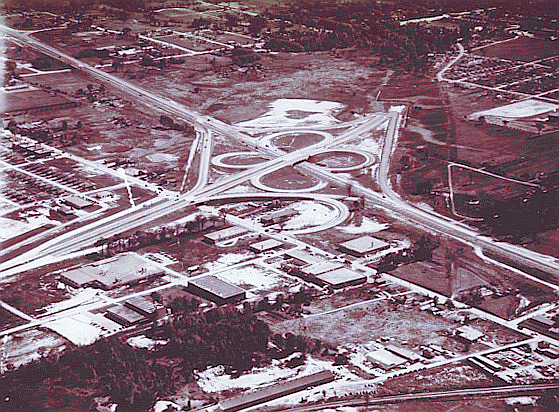
The Highway 400 interchange in 1953. Today, the former cloverleaf has been replaced with a multilevel interchange.

=== Assumption ===
In July 1952 (possibly July 1, the same day Highway 400 was numbered), (Note: The Department of Highways Fiscal Report for the year ending March 31, 1952, claims "Controlled Access Highways nos. 400 and 401 were signed". However, all other sources claim July.) the Highland Creek to Oshawa expressway (Highway 2A) and Highway 2S were designated Controlled-Access Highway No 401, a move scorned by one critic because of the lack of thought given to the numbered name. Construction was completed for several sections of the Toronto Bypass: between Highway 400 and Dufferin Street in August, west to Weston Road in September, east to Bathurst Street in October and finally to Yonge Street in December. A 3.4-kilometre (2.1 mi) stub of Highway 2A which was not incorporated into Highway 401 remained a provincial route as a connector to Kingston Road.

Extensions east and west began in 1953; the eastern extension to Bayview Avenue opened in April 1955, but the western extension was delayed by the damage caused by Hurricane Hazel on October 15, 1954, which nearly destroyed the new bridge over the Humber River. The reconstruction would take until July 8, 1955, and the highway was opened between Weston and Highway 27 in September 1955.

Within years after opening, the four-lane Toronto Bypass was congested, prompting the Department of Highways to widen this section to 12 lanes beginning in 1963.

The entire bypass, including the widening of Highway 27 into an expressway south of Highway 401, was completed in August 1956. Upon its opening, the bypass was described by one reporter as "a motorist's dream" providing "some of the most soothing scenery in the Metropolitan area". The reporter continued, with regard to the eastern section through Scarborough, that it "winds smoothly through pastures across streams and rivers, and beside green thickets. It seems a long way from the big city." By 1959 however, the bypass was a lineup of cars, as 85,000 drivers crowded the roadway, designed to handle a maximum of 48,000 vehicles, on a daily basis. Motorists found the new road to be a convenient way of travelling across Toronto; this convenience helped influence the suburban shift in the city and continues to be a driving force of urban sprawl today.

Meanwhile, beyond Toronto, the highway was being built in a patchwork fashion, focusing on congested areas first. Construction west from Highway 27 began in late 1954, as did the Kingston Bypass in Eastern Ontario. Work began to connect the latter with the Scenic Highway in 1955. After the 1954 New York State Thruway opened from Buffalo to New York City, Michigan officials encouraged Ontario to bypass Highway 3 as the most direct path from Detroit to Buffalo. By 1956, construction had begun on a segment between Highway 4 in London and Highway 2 in Woodstock, as well as on the section between Windsor and Tilbury.

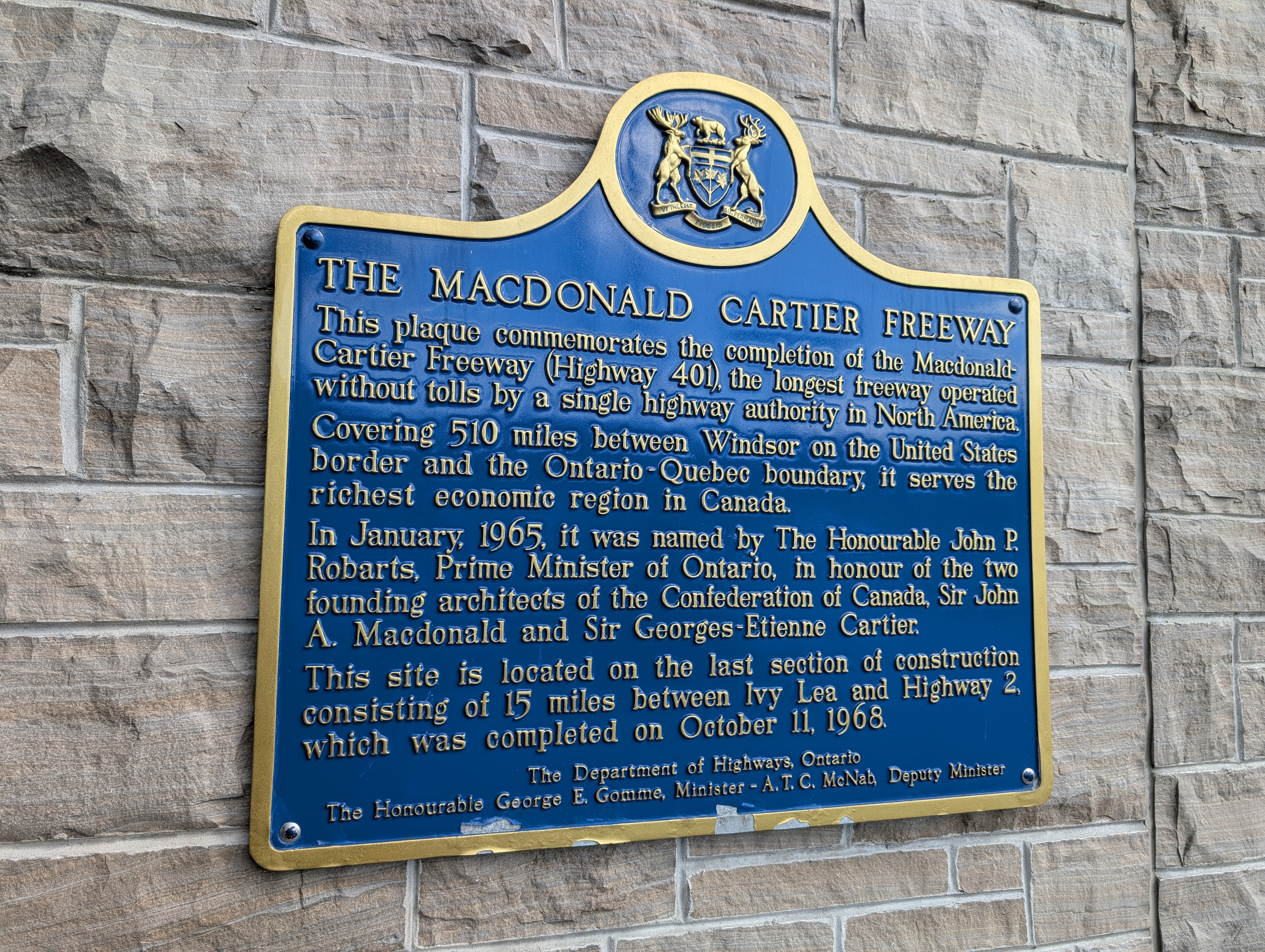
A plaque near Brockville commemorates the official completion of the highway.

In 1958, a section bypassing Morrisburg was opened to accommodate traffic displaced from a portion of Highway 2 through The Lost Villages of the Saint Lawrence Seaway.

By the end of 1960, the Toronto section of the highway was extended both eastwards and westwards: first east from Newcastle to Port Hope on June 30; then later west from Highway 25 in Milton to Highway 8 south of Kitchener on November 17. By mid-1961, the section between Brighton and Marysville had opened. The gap to the east, from Highway 28 in Port Hope to Highway 30 in Brighton was opened on July 20 of that year.

The gap between Woodstock and Kitchener was completed on November 9, 1961, while the gap between Tilbury and London was completed two lanes at a time; the westbound lanes on October 22, 1963, the eastbound on July 20, 1965. The gap between Marysville and Kingston was opened by 1962. The final sections, from west of Cornwall to Lancaster, were opened between 1962 and 1964; two lanes opened to Lancaster on September 11, 1962, but the other two were not completed until July 31, 1964. The last segment, to the Ontario–Quebec boundary, was opened on November 10, 1964.

As originally envisioned by McQuesten, Highway 401 had been routed along the Thousand Islands Parkway since 1952. However, by then numerous properties and a tourist industry were established, which had not been present when the parkway originally opened in 1938. James Auld, MPP for Leeds and the Minister of Tourism and Information, joined local residents to persuade the DHO to construct an inland bypass. The DHO agreed, stating that it would cost less to build a new freeway than to upgrade the parkway. Construction of the Thousand Islands Bypass began in 1965, with work proceeding east from Gananoque. The Thousand Islands Parkway was the final two-lane segment of Highway 401. A portion was opened on September 1, 1967, from Gananoque to Highway 137, which was itself built south to the parkway at the same time. The Highway 401 designation was applied along this new route, while the bypassed portion of the parkway was redesignated as Highway 2S. Despite the expected influx of traffic from the United States for Expo 67 in Montreal, the DHO opted to build the portion east of Ivy Lea after the centennial celebrations.

Finally, on October 11, 1968, the Thousand Islands Bypass opened. This final piece was commemorated with a plaque to signify the completion of Highway 401.

=== Expansion ===
The widening of Highway 401 from four to twelve lanes in Toronto took nine years and was accomplished with at least four lanes open at all times. Shown here is the Highway 401 / Don Valley Parkway interchange (which replaced an earlier interchange with Woodbine Avenue, and would link to the future Highway 404) under construction in 1965.

In Toronto, engineers and surveyors were examining the four-lane bypass, while planners set about designing a way to handle the commuter highway. In 1963, transportation minister Charles MacNaughton announced the widening of Highway 401 in Toronto from four to a minimum of 12 lanes between Islington Avenue and Markham Road. The design was taken from the Dan Ryan Expressway in Chicago, which was widened into a similar configuration around the same time. Construction began immediately. While the plan initially called for construction to end in 1967, it continued for nearly a decade. At least four lanes were always open during the large reconstruction project, which included complex new interchanges at Highway 27, Highway 400, the planned Spadina Expressway and the Don Valley Parkway. The system was completed in 1972, along with the Highway 27 (renamed Highway 427) bypass between the QEW and Pearson Airport. Most of the interchanges in Toronto were reconstructed as partial cloverleafs and a continuous lighting system was installed.

On January 11, 1965, at the dinner celebration of Sir John A. Macdonald's 150th birthday, the Premier of Ontario John Robarts designated Highway 401 the Macdonald–Cartier Freeway to honour Macdonald and George-Étienne Cartier, two of Canada's Fathers of Confederation. Unlike other names later applied to the highway, the "Macdonald–Cartier Freeway" designation covers the entire length of Highway 401. Signs designating the freeway and shields with the letters "M-C" were installed, but these had been removed by 1997. In 2003, 38 years after Robarts' naming of the highway, an Ontario Member of Provincial Parliament attempted to get the "Macdonald–Cartier Freeway" highway name enshrined into law; the bill only passed first reading and was not enacted.

In the 1970s, Highway 401 was widened to six lanes in Durham. Between 1977 and 1982, the 401 was widened from four to six lanes between Hurontario Street (Highway 10) to Highway 25, with the Jersey median barrier making its debut in Ontario in that segment.

The Highway 401-403-410 interchange looking east in 1987. At the time, the Highway 401 collector and express lanes merged prior to crossing Tomken Road. At the time, Highway 410 was only a Super two highway which connected to Highway 401 east of the interchange.

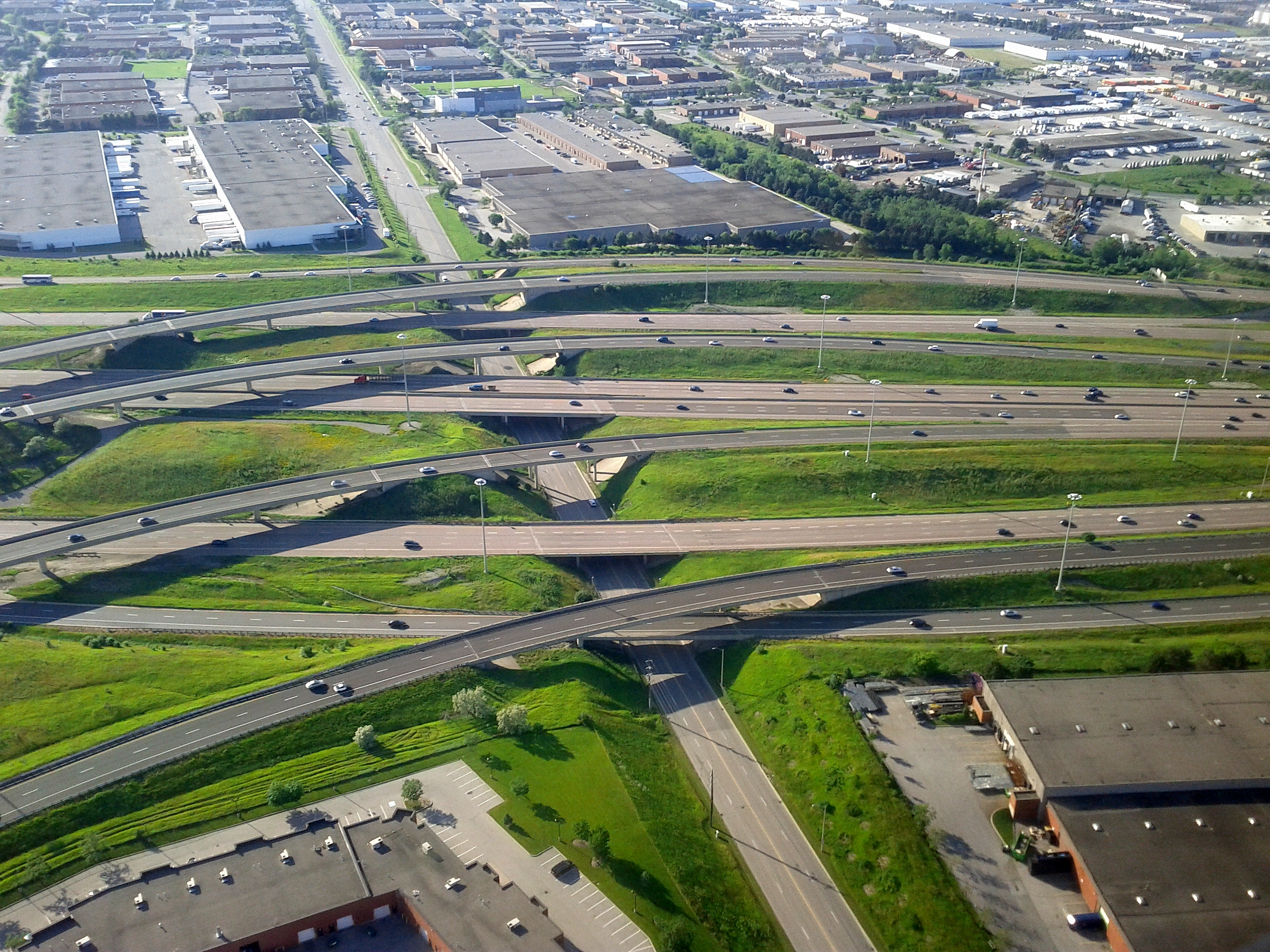

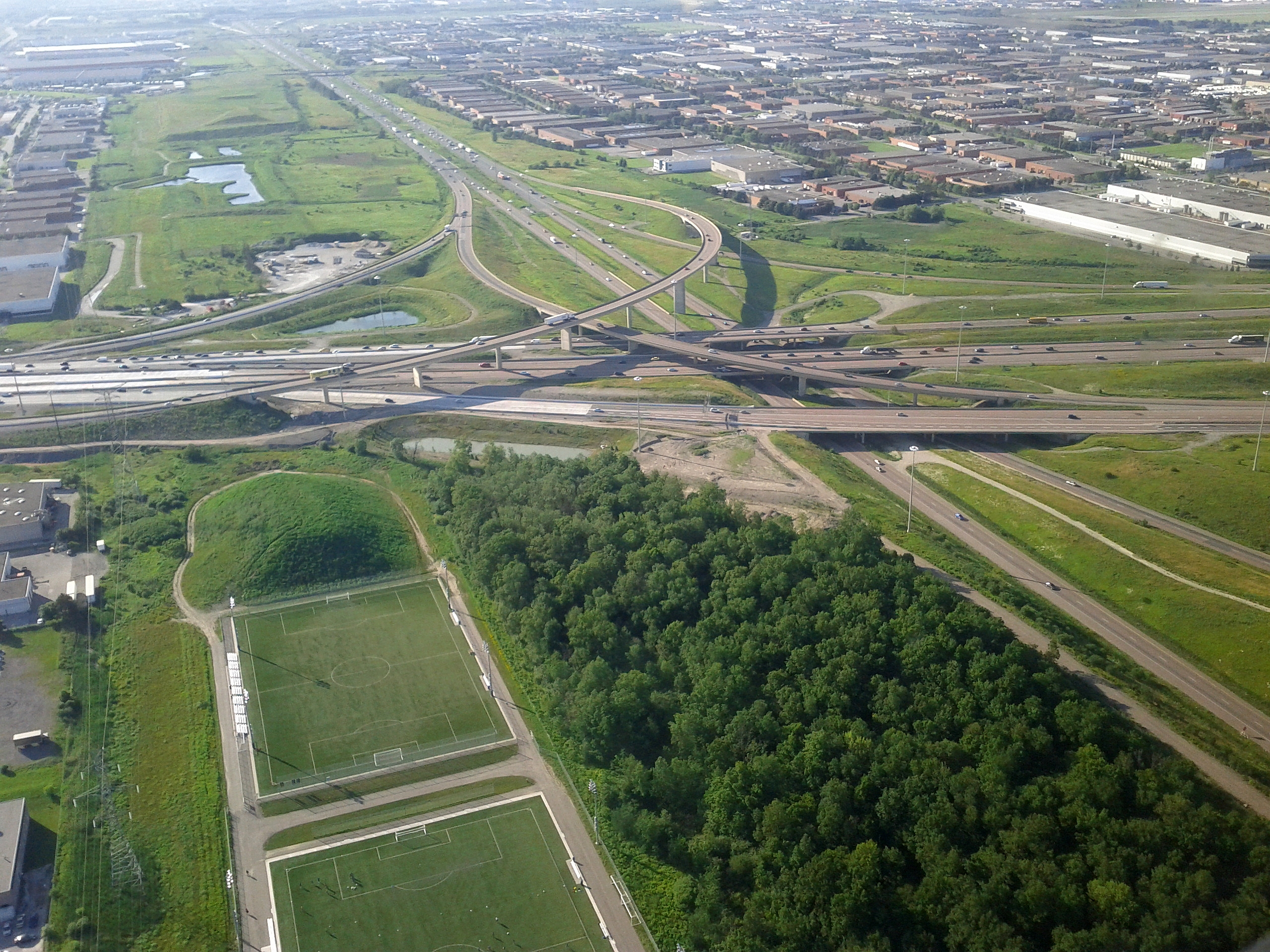
The expanded interchange looking north in 2013, showing the flyover ramps between Highway 401 and Highway 410 with the Highway 401 express lanes underneath them.

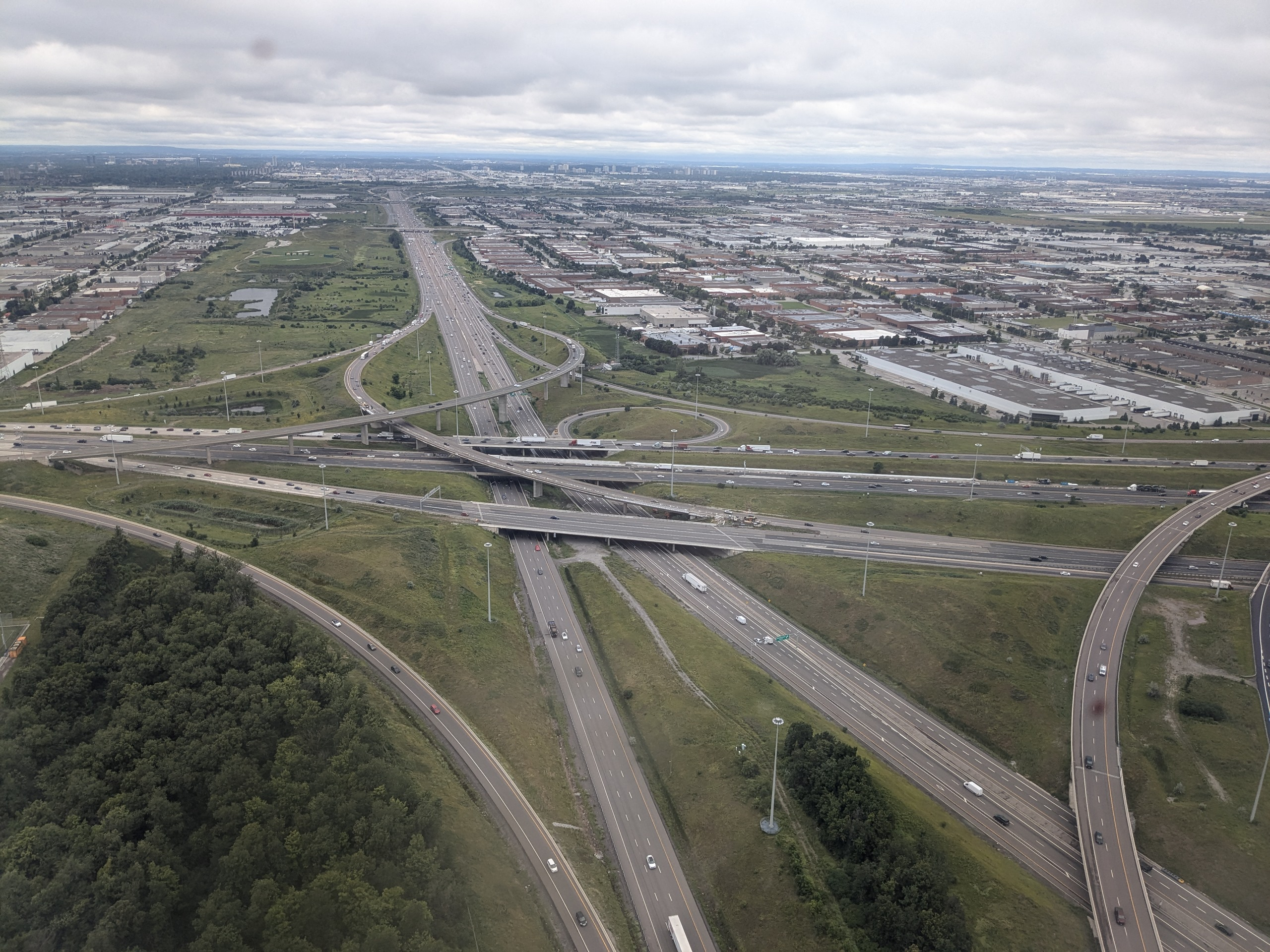
The completed interchange in 2024

Plans had been completely modified to connect the under-construction Mississauga leg of Highway 403 from QEW to Highway 401 at the new Highway 410 interchange. For Highway 403, the Highway 410 interchange was a better connection point than the original suggested terminus at the Highway 401–427 interchange, but would also require the widening of Highway 401 between Highway 403 and Highway 427 from eight lanes to an eighteen-lane collector-express system. Plans were submitted and approved in December 1977 by Mississauga city council, and construction began. The first section of Highway 403 between Cawthra Road and Highway 401 was opened August 18, 1980; the original connecting ramps were built on the outer perimeter of the interchange to serve what would later be designated as the collector lanes of both routes, leaving sufficient right-of-way between for future ramps linking the express lanes of both routes.

The 1980s saw more sections of Highway 401 widened. Most significant was the new collector-express system between Highway 403 / 410 and Highway 427. This including a new set of flyover ramps from the express lanes to Highway 403 which opened in 1984, while a basketweave transfer between the eastbound collector and express lanes near Pearson Airport was completed in mid-1985. At this time, the Highway 401 express lanes merged/diverged into/from the collector lanes east of Tomken Road which resulted in a temporary left-handed exit/entry for the ramps to/from the Highway 403 express lanes.

After the Kennedy Road overpass was replaced, cast-in-place post-tensioned concrete flyover ramps were constructed from 1988 to late 1990 to link up Highway 401 and Highway 410, notably the 11-span flyover ramp from Highway 401 eastbound to Highway 410 northbound which remains the longest in the Greater Toronto Area, while the Highway 410 southbound to Highway 401 eastbound flyover replaced a loop ramp. In the fall of 1991, alongside the widening of Highway 410 into a full freeway, construction began on the connecting ramps between Highway 403 and Highway 410, made possible by the removal of the loop ramp (see above) which pass under the existing bridge structures carrying Highway 401 which would soon be designated as the collector lanes. In 1993, new overpasses crossing Tomken Road and the connecting ramps between Highway 403 and Highway 410 were constructed for the Highway 401 express lanes, extending Highway 401's collector-express system from east of Tomken Road to just east of Kennedy Road.

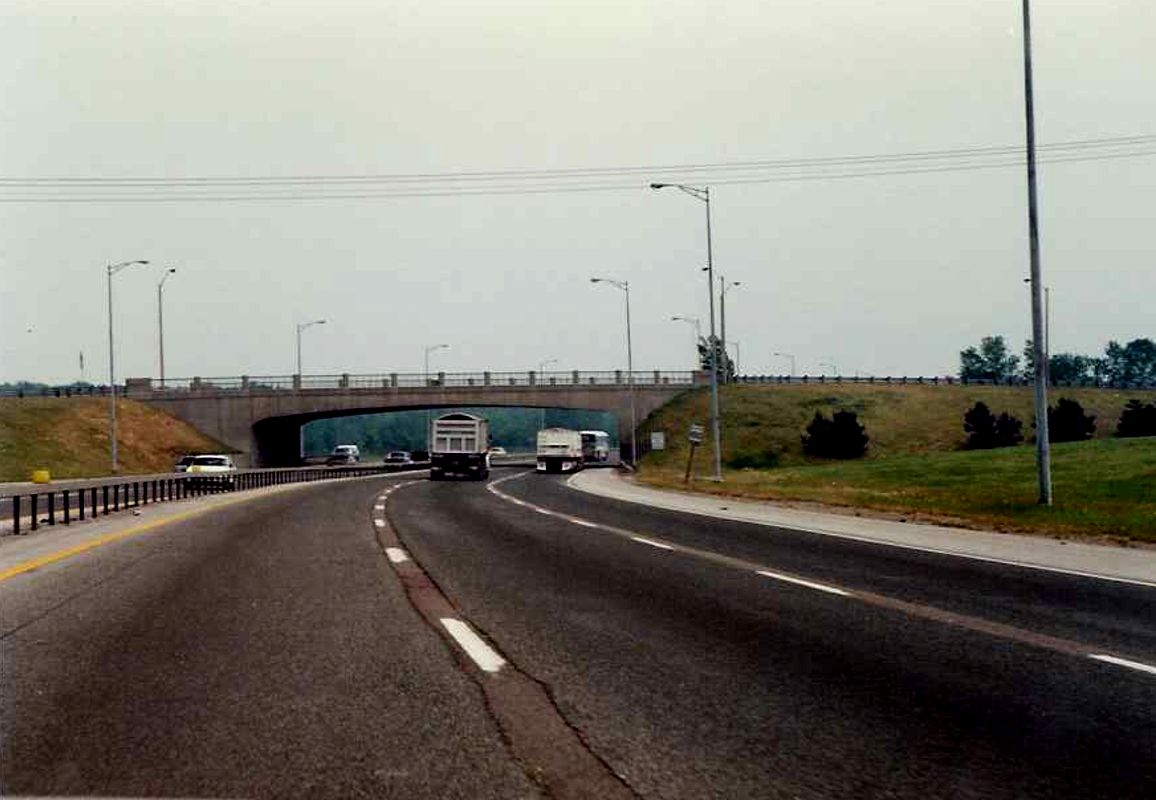
Highway 401 at Meadowvale Road in 1989, before being widened to a 14-lane collector-express system.

Plans were made to extend the eastern system from Toronto's Neilson Road to Pickering's Brock Road in the late 1980s, but took over a decade to reach fruition by 1997. This was followed shortly thereafter by the widening of the highway through Ajax and a new interchange at Pickering Beach Road (renamed Salem Road) and Stevenson Road.

The 1990s also saw the first step in widening the highway from Toronto to London, by replacing the grass median with the addition of a third traffic lane per direction separated by a tall-wall concrete median barrier. The segment from London to Woodstock received this upgrade first, with the expansion shortly east of the split for Highway 403's newly constructed western segment. A project in the mid-1990s brought the highway up to a minimum of six lanes between Highway 8 in Kitchener and Highway 35 / 115 in Newcastle. Other projects prepared sections for eventual widening.

In its 2007 plan for southern Ontario, the MTO announced long-term plans to create high-occupancy vehicle (HOV) lanes from Mississauga Road west to Milton; by 2011 these plans had been expanded in scope to as far west as Hespeler Road in Cambridge.

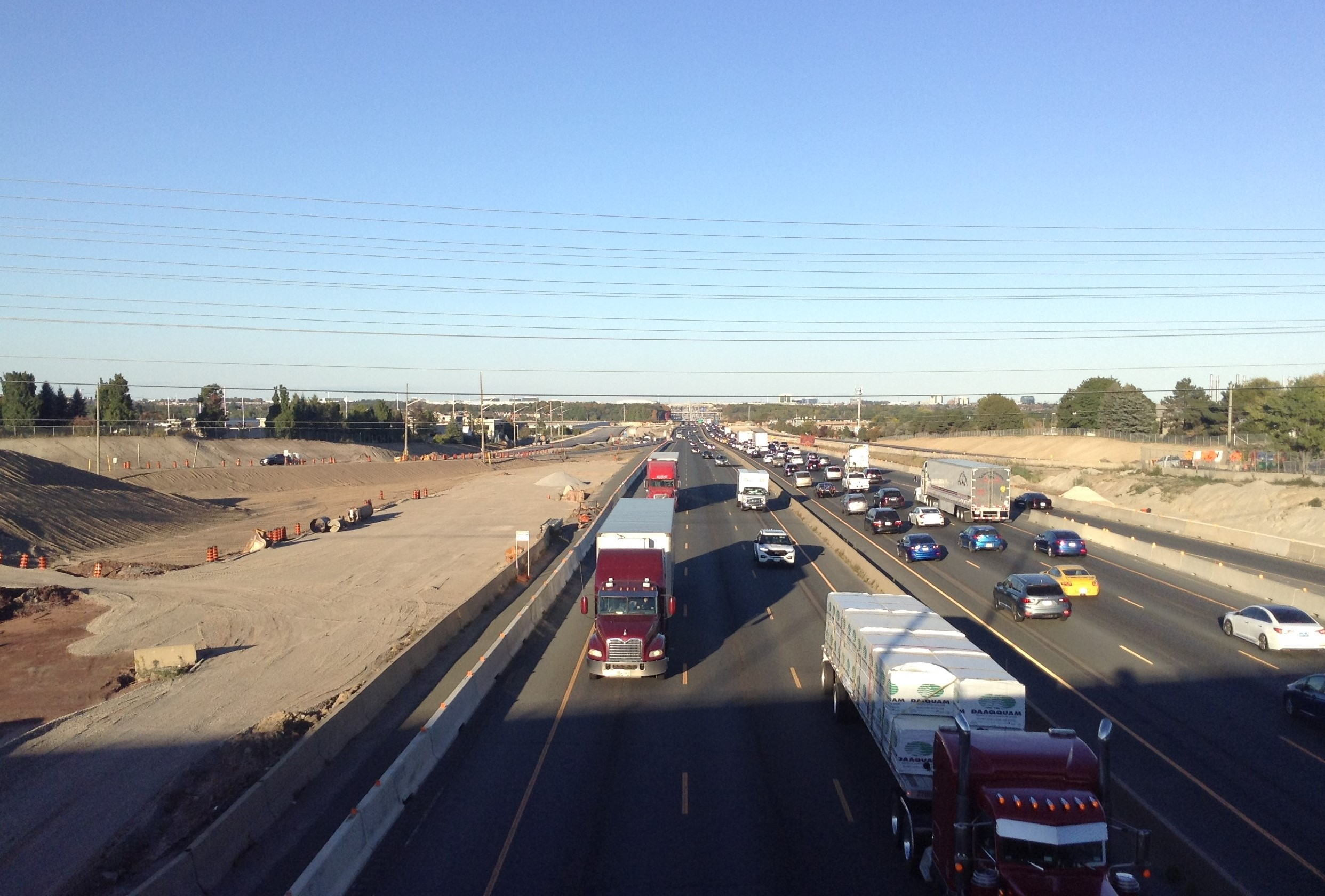
Hwy. 401 widening work in Mississauga looking east from the Mississauga Road overpass in 2020.

From the mid-1990s onward, several prerequisite projects were undertaken for the future widening of Highway 401 throughout Milton and Mississauga, although that section of the freeway would retain its six-lane cross section for at least the next decade. This included the new interchange with the upcoming Highway 407 ETR (with a temporary diversion for the eastbound lanes to facilitate construction of the post-tensioned flyovers), a new underpass structure to accommodate Derry Road which was widened from two to six lanes (1996–97), the addition of an interchange with the Mavis Road extension in 1999, whose overpass was designed to be lengthened with two outer spans, and replacing the Mississauga Road overpass and interchange which began on February 15, 2002 (in a cost-sharing agreement between the province and Peel Region) and completed in 2003. More recent work included the replacement of the McLaughlin Road overpass in 2008.

Starting on August 19, 2009, Highway 401's collector-express lanes in Mississauga have been extended westward beyond its initial terminus at Highway 410. The widening of this 7-kilometre segment to the Credit River necessitated the replacement of several existing overpasses, including those of Hurontario Street (2013) and Second Line West (2016), with the Second Line West crossing rebuilt as a pedestrian/cyclist bridge since most vehicular traffic was already rerouted to the Mavis Road extension. Tying into this extension of Highway 401's collector-express system, the missing ramps from Highway 401 eastbound to Highway 403 westbound and the opposite movement were completed in 2018 (which also provided direct access to Cawthra Road), making the Highway 401-403-410 junction a full, four-way interchange. The first phase of this expansion to west of Hurontario Street, a distance of 2.8 kilometres (1.7 mi), opened in 2013, while the second phase to the Credit River was completed in 2020.

In 2019, an announcement was made for expanding the freeway from the Credit River to Regional Road 25 in Milton to a minimum of 10 lanes, including HOV lanes. This project included extending the existing 12-lane collector–express system from the Credit River to just east of Winston Churchill Boulevard, while another 12-lane collector–express system was built from just west of the Highway 407 interchange to just east of James Snow Parkway, due to the overpasses for Highway 407 and the adjacent Winston Churchill Boulevard not being constructed wide enough to accommodate a continuous collector–express system underneath.

Sections of the new expansion were opened overnight throughout the second half of 2022. On August 13 and 14, 2022, the westbound express lanes opened between Highway 407 and James Snow Parkway. The remainder of the westbound lanes, between the Credit River and Winston Churchill Boulevard, were opened several months later on November 13 and 14. The eastbound express lanes between James Snow Parkway and Winston Churchill Boulevard were opened a week later on November 18 and 19, and from Winston Churchill Boulevard to the Credit River on November 29 and 30. The HOV lanes in both directions were opened on December 9, 2022. The remaining works of this project, including final layers of paving, culvert works, and carpool lots were completed on October 19, 2023, thus completing a 14-year project that expands the highway from Highway 410 to Regional Road 25 that started on August 19, 2009.

=== COMPASS cameras ===
In early 1991, Highway 401 was equipped with a traffic camera system called COMPASS. Using closed-circuit television cameras, vehicle detection loops and LED changeable-message signs, COMPASS enables the MTO Traffic Operations Centre to obtain a real-time assessment of traffic conditions and alert drivers of collisions, congestion and construction. The system stretches from the Highway 403 / 410 interchange in Mississauga to Harwood Avenue in Ajax.

=== Advantage I-75 ===
Between June 1990 and 1998, Highway 401 and Interstate 75 were used for a pilot project named Advantage I-75 to test the reliability and versatility of an automated tracking system for transport trucks. Termed "MACS" (Mainline Automated Clearance System), it allows a truck to travel from Florida to Ontario without a second inspection. MACS was initially tested at two truck inspection stations in Kentucky, with transponders installed in 220 trucks. Exact time, date, location, weight and axle data were logged as a truck approached an equipped station. Following initial tests, MACS was deployed at every inspection station along I-75 from Miami to Detroit, and along Highway 401 from Windsor to Belleville in 1994. The project demonstrated the effectiveness of electronic systems in enforcing freight restrictions without delaying vehicles, while alleviating security fears such systems could be compromised. The concept has since been applied to many parts of Canada, including Highway 407's electronic tolling system.

=== "Carnage Alley" ===
The 87-vehicle pile up on September 3, 1999

The section of Highway 401 between Windsor and London has often been referred to as Carnage Alley, in reference to the numerous crashes that have occurred throughout its history. The term became more commonplace following several deadly pileups during the 1990s. The narrow and open grass median was an ineffective obstacle in preventing cross-median collisions. The soft shoulders consisted of gravel, with sharp slopes which were blamed for facilitating vehicle rollovers. The nature of that section of highway, described as a mainly straight road with a featureless agricultural landscape, was said to make drivers feel less involved and lose focus on the road. In winter, the area between Woodstock and Chatham is also subject to sudden snow squalls from lake-effect snow. Several collisions have resulted from motorists deviating from their lane and losing control of their vehicles.

Various other names, including The Killer Highway circulated for a time, but Carnage Alley became predominant following an 87-vehicle pile-up on September 3, 1999 (the start of Labour Day weekend), the worst in Canadian history, that resulted in eight deaths and 45 injured individuals. On that morning, the local weather station reported clear conditions due to a malfunction, while a thick layer of fog rolled onto the highway. Dozens of vehicles, including several semi-trailers, quickly crashed into each other shortly after 8 a.m., one following another in the dense fog, with collisions in both directions at that segment of Highway 401, although no vehicles crossed the highway's median. Only a few days prior, then-Transportation Minister David Turnbull had deemed the highway "pleasant" to drive. Immediately following the crash, the MTO installed paved shoulders with rumble strips and funded additional police to patrol the highway, a move criticized as being insufficient.

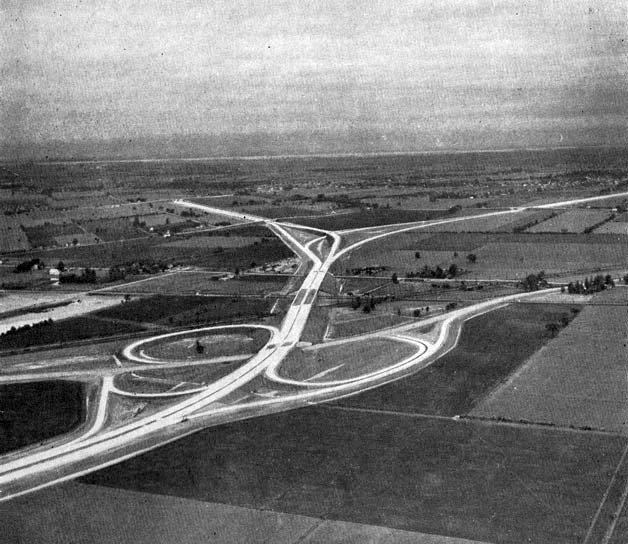
Highway 401 facing southwest in 1958, at the interchange with then-Highway 98 (now Provincial Road) in the foreground, and the split at Dougall Parkway in the background. This segment would be reconstructed in 2008–10.

Beginning in 2004, 46 km (29 mi) of the highway was widened from four asphalt lanes to six concrete lanes, paved shoulders were added, and a concrete Ontario Tall Wall barrier was installed in the median, a solution that the Canadian Automobile Association had been promoting since the 1999 Labour Day pileup. Interchanges were improved and signage was upgraded as part of a five-phase project to improve Highway 401 from Highway 3 in Windsor to Essex County Road 42 (formerly Highway 2) on the western edge of Tilbury.

From 2008 to 2010, with joint funding from the provincial and federal governments, the section of Highway 401 from Dougall Parkway (the former Highway 3B) to Provincial Road (the former Highway 98) was widened to six lanes, necessitating the replacement of several underpasses including those of Walker Road and Provincial Road. The loop ramp from Provincial Road southbound to Highway 401 eastbound was removed, although the rest of the interchange remained unchanged. As part of that project, the Dougall Parkway split with Highway 401 was reconfigured, replacing a one-lane 1950s-era underpass tunnel with a modern high-speed flyover ramp from Dougall Parkway that joins the eastbound freeway lanes on the right-hand side. The old interchange had reduced Highway 401 eastbound traffic to one lane as it merged with the left-hand on-ramp from Dougall Parkway, whereas the new interchange allows three lanes per direction of Highway 401 to pass through. West of the reconstructed Dougall Parkway onramp, Highway 401's grass median was replaced with a concrete barrier but continued to be striped for two lanes per direction until the North Talbot Road overpass was replaced and Phase One of the Highway 401 extension (Rt. Hon. Herb Gray Parkway, formerly Windsor-Essex Parkway) (see below) opened in 2015, allowing for a continuous six lane freeway cross-section.

=== Highway of Heroes ===
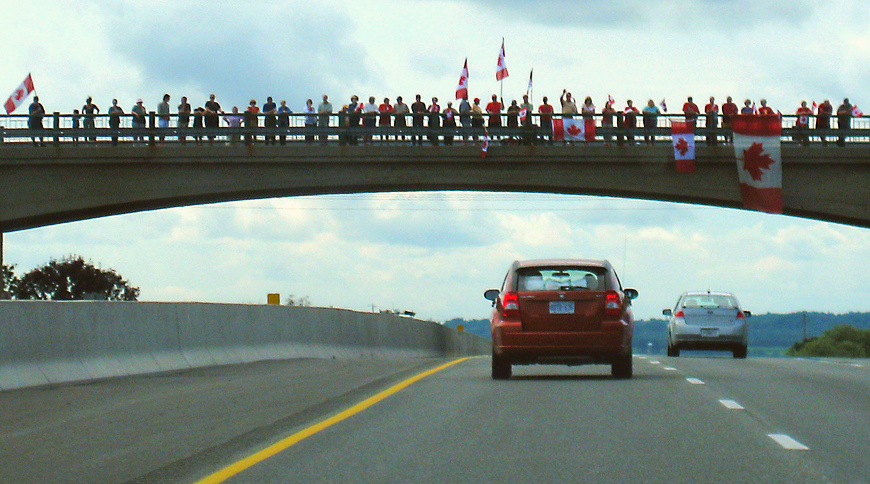
Canadians line overpasses along the Highway of Heroes to pay their respects to fallen soldiers.

On August 24, 2007, the MTO announced that the stretch of Highway 401 between Glen Miller Road in Trenton and the intersection of Highway 404 and the Don Valley Parkway in Toronto would bear its additional name, Highway of Heroes (French: Autoroute des héros), in honour of Canadian soldiers who have died, though Highway 401 in its entirety remains designated as the Macdonald–Cartier Freeway. This length of the highway is often travelled by a convoy of vehicles carrying a fallen soldier's body, with his or her family, from the military airport at CFB Trenton to the coroner's office at the Centre of Forensic Sciences in Toronto. Since 2002, when the first fallen Canadian soldiers were repatriated from Afghanistan, crowds have lined the overpasses to pay their respects as convoys pass.

The reassurance marker for the Highway of Heroes

The origin of the name can be traced to an article in the Toronto Sun on June 23, 2007, by columnist Joe Warmington, in which he interviewed Northumberland photographer Pete Fisher. Cobourg resident Ron Flindall was responsible for organizing the first bridge salutes following the loss of four soldiers on April 18, 2002.

Warmington described the gathering of crowds on overpasses to welcome fallen soldiers as a "highway of heroes phenomena". This led a Cramahe Township volunteer firefighter to contact Fisher on July 10 about starting a petition, leading Fisher to publish an article which was posted to the Northumberland Today website. The online article eventually caught the attention of London resident Jay Forbes. Forbes began a petition, which received over 20,000 signatures before being brought to the Minister of Transportation on August 22. Following the announcement on August 24, the provincial government and MTO set out to design new signs. The signs were erected and unveiled on September 7, and include a smaller reassurance marker (shield), as well as a larger billboard version.

On September 27, 2013, the Highway of Heroes designation was extended west to Keele Street in Toronto, to coincide with the move of the coroner's office to the new Forensic Services and Coroner's Complex located at Highway 401 and Keele Street.

=== Highway improvements and safety concerns ===
==== London and Kitchener ====
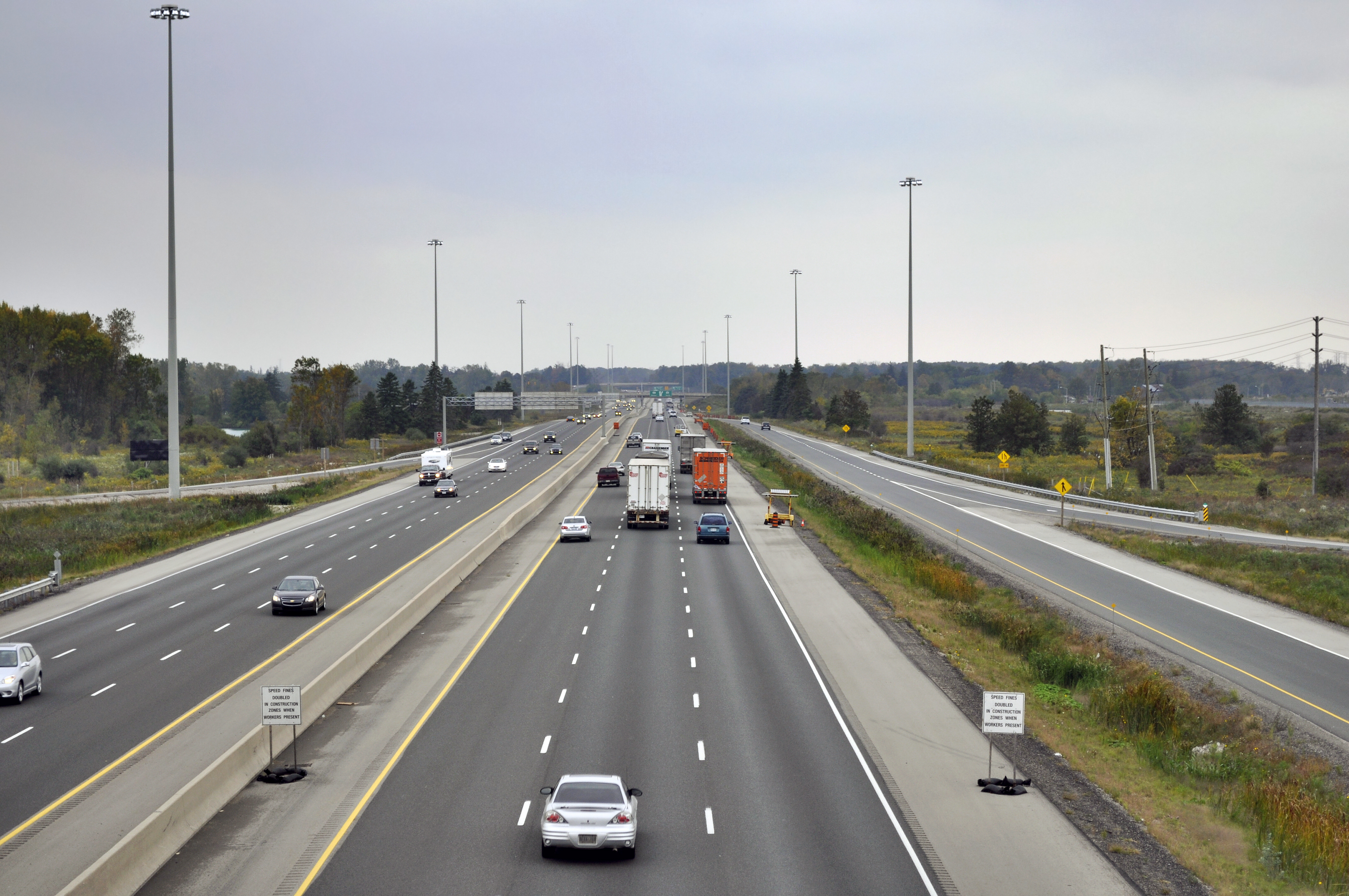
Highway 401 was widened in 2008 between Highway 402 and Wellington Road in London. Additional widening west of Highway 402 is planned.

Between 2006 and 2008, Highway 401 was widened from four to six lanes between Highway 402 and Wellington Road in London. This included reconfiguring the Wellington Road interchange from a cloverleaf to a Parclo A4 while replacing the original 1956 overpass with a longer and wider structure.

In November 2010, the widening of Highway 401 from four to six lanes between Woodstock and Kitchener was completed after many years of planning and construction. The project included the installation of a tall-wall median barrier, straightening curves and adding additional interchanges on the freeway, allowing it to be easily vacated in an emergency event. The interchange with Oxford Road 2 (former Highway 2) was reconfigured from a cloverleaf to a five-ramp parclo in the late 2000s, around the time that the Toyota West Plant was constructed.

==== Greater Toronto Area ====
Beginning in 1998, several projects were initiated on Highway 401 within Toronto. In 2000, near the Allen Road interchange, the westbound express-to-collector transfer (meant to serve motorists on the express lanes wishing to get off at Keele Street, but turned out to be lightly used) was closed off and replaced by a new collector-to-express transfer. From 2005 to 2007, the Hogg's Hollow bridges were rehabilitated and the Yonge Street underpasses were replaced, with the structure carrying the eastbound collectors being widened from two to three lanes through the interchange with Yonge Street.The most significant construction work was widening the route from six to eight lanes though the Highway 427 interchange in 2005, which necessitated the replacement of the Highway 27 underpass, although the rest of the junction's flyovers could accommodate the expansion. Some projects have been completed during overnight construction projects, including the replacement of the original gantries throughout the collector-express system, resurfacing of the freeway's pavement, and rehabilitating the flyover ramps of the Highway 401 / 400 interchange.

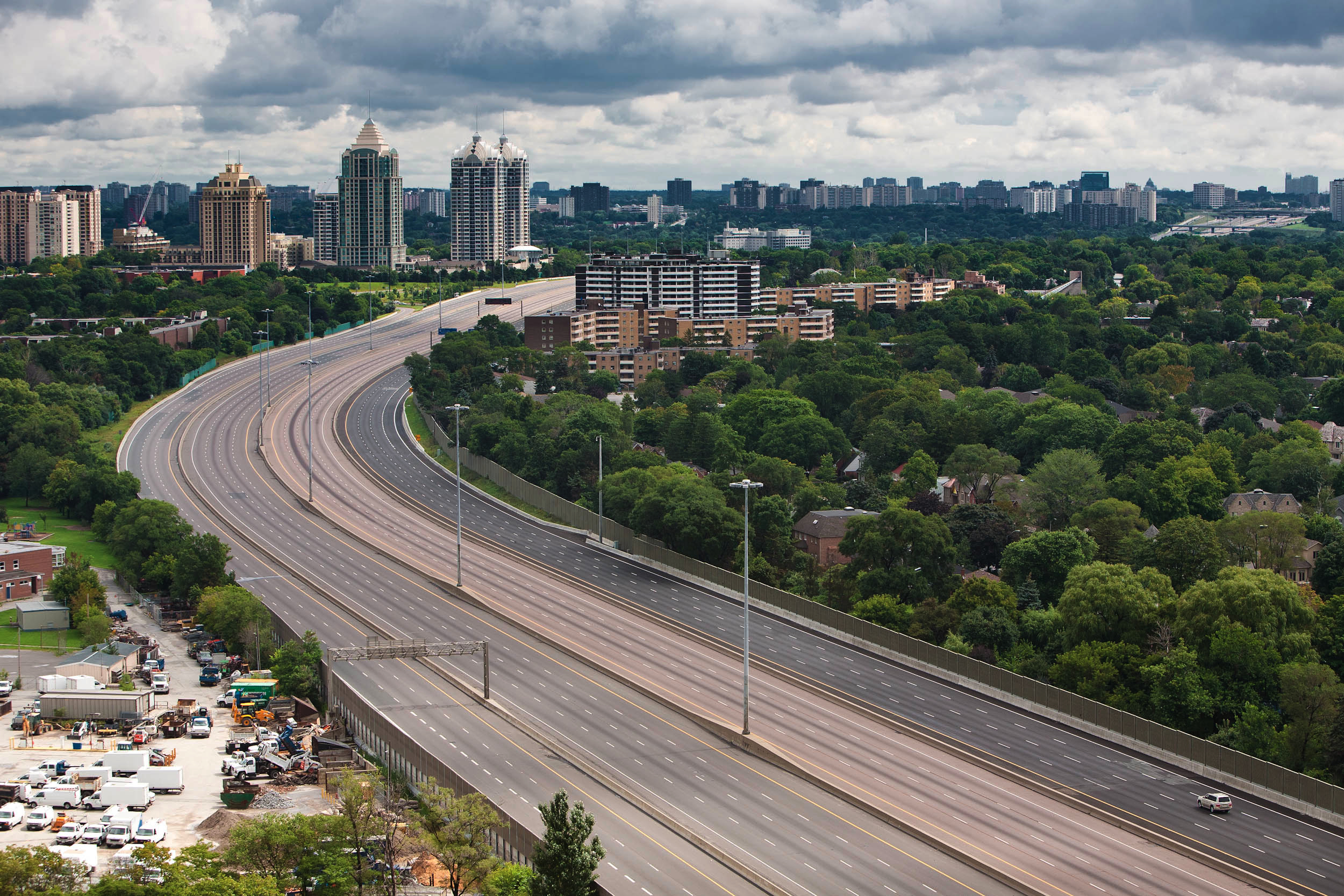
An empty Highway 401 through Toronto following a series of propane explosions in 2008.

On August 10, 2008, following a series of explosions at a propane facility in Toronto, Highway 401 was closed between Highway 400 and Highway 404 as a precautionary measure, the largest closure of the highway in its history. The highway remained closed until 8 p.m., though several exits near the blast remained closed thereafter.

In Oshawa, exit 416 (Park Road) was replaced by a new interchange at exit 415 (Stevenson Road). The contract, which began September 7, 2005, included the interchange and the resurfacing of 23.4 km (14.5 mi) of the highway between Oshawa and Highway 35 / Highway 115. The westbound ramps were opened in mid-September 2007 and the eastbound ramps in mid-2009. The resurfacing was completed mid-2010.

Completed (but not yet open) interchange with Highway 418, facing north, in 2019

In 2013, as a prerequisite to construction of the West Durham Link which was eventually numbered as Highway 412, the section of Highway 401 near the Lake Ridge Road overpass was shifted northward on a new alignment away from the parallel railway lines to allow sufficient right-of-way for the interchange to the new route. The existing Lake Ridge Road overpass was also replaced by a new longer structure that would span both the existing and new alignments of the 401 as well as the railways. Once the new alignment of the 401 was opened for both directions, the old 401 right-of-way was used for the semi-directional onramp from the 401 eastbound to Highway 412 as well as an offramp to Lake Ridge Road. The interchange to 412 opened on June 20, 2016.

Highway 401's interchange with Highway 418 (East Durham Link) opened on December 9, 2019, alongside the opening of an eastern extension of Highway 407.

=== Rt. Hon. Herb Gray Parkway ===
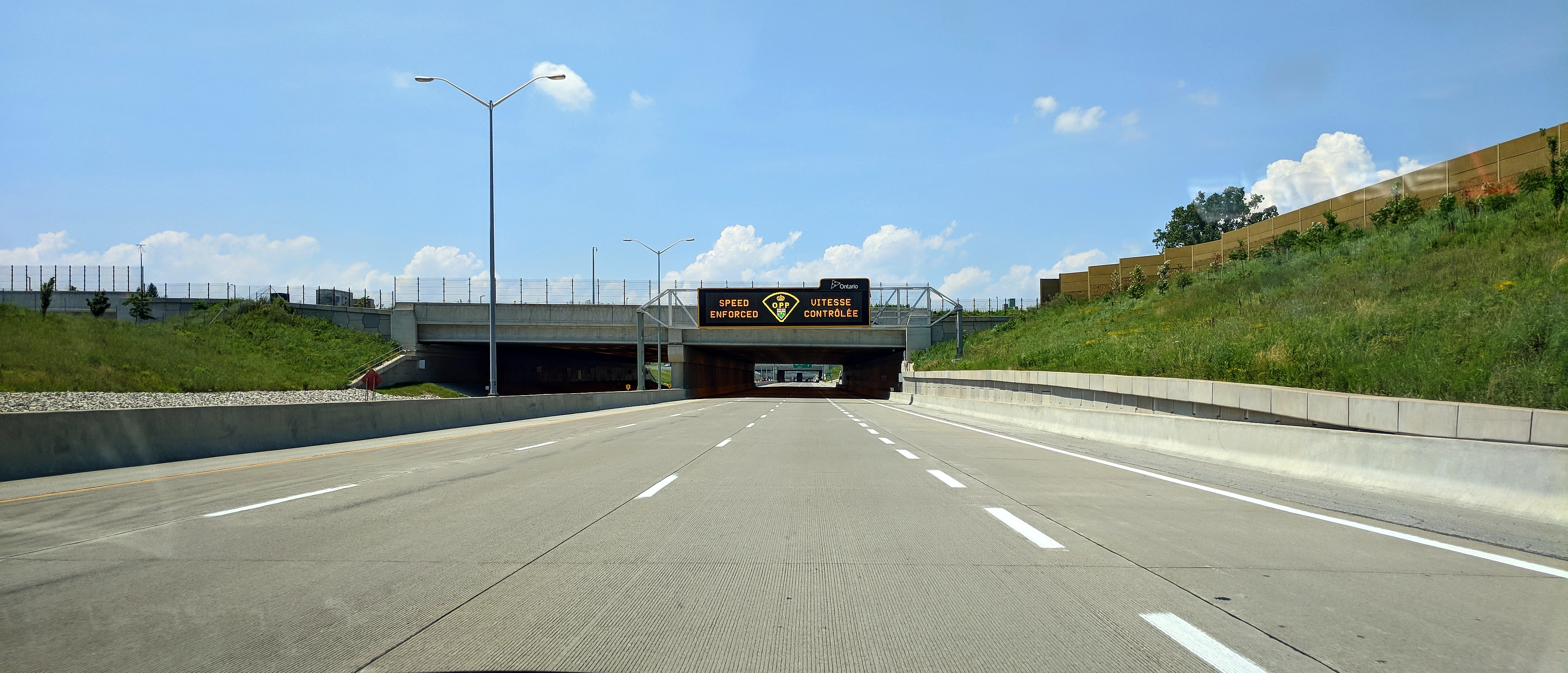
The Highway 401 extension in Windsor, opened in 2015, showing the below-grade portion with tunnels and greenspace. It connects to the Gordie Howe International Bridge.

Highway 401, as originally completed, did not have direct access to the Canada–United States border, as upon entering the Windsor city limits, the route terminated at a semi-directional Y interchange where the freeway defaulted into Highway 3. Traffic continuing to the border had to follow the non-express Highway 3 routing along Talbot Road and Huron Church Road which had a dozen traffic lights. The approach to the Ambassador Bridge was heavily built up making it impractical to twin the existing crossing and reconstruct the approach as a freeway to meet growing demand for cross-border traffic, even though Ambassador Bridge owner Matty Moroun had long lobbied for this.

In 2004, a joint announcement by the federal government of the United States and Government of Canada confirmed that a new border crossing (later named the Gordie Howe International Bridge) would be constructed between Detroit and Windsor. The Detroit River International Crossing (DRIC) was formed as a bi-national committee to manage the project. The MTO took advantage of this opportunity to extend Highway 401 to the Canada–US border and began an environmental impact assessment on the entire project in late 2005. The City of Windsor also hired New York traffic consultant Sam Schwartz to design a parkway to the border. Schwartz's proposal would eventually inspire the DRIC's own design, but his route was not chosen, with the DRIC opting instead to take a northern route. On February 8, 2008, the MTO announced it had begun purchasing property south of the E. C. Row Expressway, upsetting many area residents who had purchased properties in the years prior.

On March 3, 2008, the Michigan Department of Transportation and the MTO (in partnership with Transport Canada, the Federal Highway Administration of the United States and the Detroit River International Crossing group) completed a joint assessment on the soils along the Detroit River and determined they could indeed support the weight of a new bridge; the stability of the underlying soil and clay and the impact of the nearby Windsor Salt Mine had caused concern for all parties involved in the project.

Despite protest from area residents, as well as a dismissed lawsuit from Ambassador Bridge owner Matty Moroun, it was announced on May 1, 2008, that a preferred route had been selected for the Highway 401 extension which would be named the Windsor–Essex Parkway. On November 28, 2012, the Ministry of Transportation announced that a Federal Order in Council was passed to change the name of the parkway to the Rt. Hon. Herb Gray Parkway, in honour of the Right Honourable Herb Gray, a Member of Parliament from Windsor.

The Highway 401 extension (Rt. Hon. Herb Gray Parkway, formerly Windsor-Essex Parkway, MTO internal designation of Highway 7901) would first run parallel to the realigned Highway 3 (Talbot Road and Huron Church Road) from a new interchange at the former end of Highway 401 to the E. C. Row Expressway. The Highway 401 extension would then turn westward and continue between the opposing carriageways of the E. C. Row Expressway for 2 km (1.2 mi) (requiring that the E. C. Row's eastbound carriageway between Matchette Road and Huron Church Road be shifted so the median can accommodate the Highway 401 extension), with slip ramps linking the E. C. Row to the bridge-bound Highway 401. At the Ojibway Parkway, the Highway 401 extension would turn northwest and follows a new alignment to the border. The Highway 401 extension would have six through-lanes, and the section parallel to Highway 3 is below-grade with 11 covered tunnels ranging from 120 to 240 metres (390 to 790 ft) in length. The Highway 401 extension features 120 hectares (300 acres) of green space and over 20 kilometres (12 mi) of recreational trails, with seven bridges and two tunnels separating the trails from roads. Interpretive signage includes information about First Nations in Canada, Tallgrass prairie and the Carolinian landscape.

Initial construction of a noise barrier from North Talbot Road to Howard Avenue began in March 2010; full construction began on August 19, 2011. The original North Talbot Road overpass was demolished on August 20, 2011, to make way for the widening of the existing freeway from four through-lanes, however the replacement bridge was closed in December 2013 due to faulty concrete girders and rebuilt by May 2014. Progress on the freeway extension was delayed as the construction consortium disposed of over 500 concrete girders (including the 320 girders already installed), after a Ministry of Transport investigation found that these girders manufactured from a partnership of Freyssinet and Tierra Armada did not meet standard, and replaced by those from Prestressed Systems Inc. at no cost to the public.

The Highway 401 extension was built on a new alignment while Highway 3 (Talbot Road) was also rerouted, so the old interchange of Highway 401 at Highway 3 remained in service until it was bypassed once the extension and replacement interchange opened. The old interchange as well as the signalized intersection at Outer Drive has since been removed. In early 2015, it was announced the first phase of the Highway 401 extension would open to traffic between Highway 3 and Labelle Street (near the E. C. Row Expressway) in the spring; an 8-kilometre (5 mi) section was opened to traffic on June 28, 2015, extending Highway 401 as far west as the E. C. Row Expressway, the first new segment of Highway 401 to be opened since the Thousand Islands Parkway bypass in 1968. The first phase of the Highway 401 extension provides an express bypass to much of (but not all of) Highway 3 en route to the Ambassador Bridge. The E. C. Row still lacked direct access to the London-bound portion of Highway 401, however, the indirect connection using Huron Church Road was reduced to a short distance (with one traffic light) between the Parclo A4 interchange with the E. C. Row and the slip ramps to the first phase of the Highway 401 extension. The second phase of the Highway 401 extension to Ojibway Parkway was opened on November 21, 2015 completing the Highway 401 extension as far as the future bridge approach and border plaza.

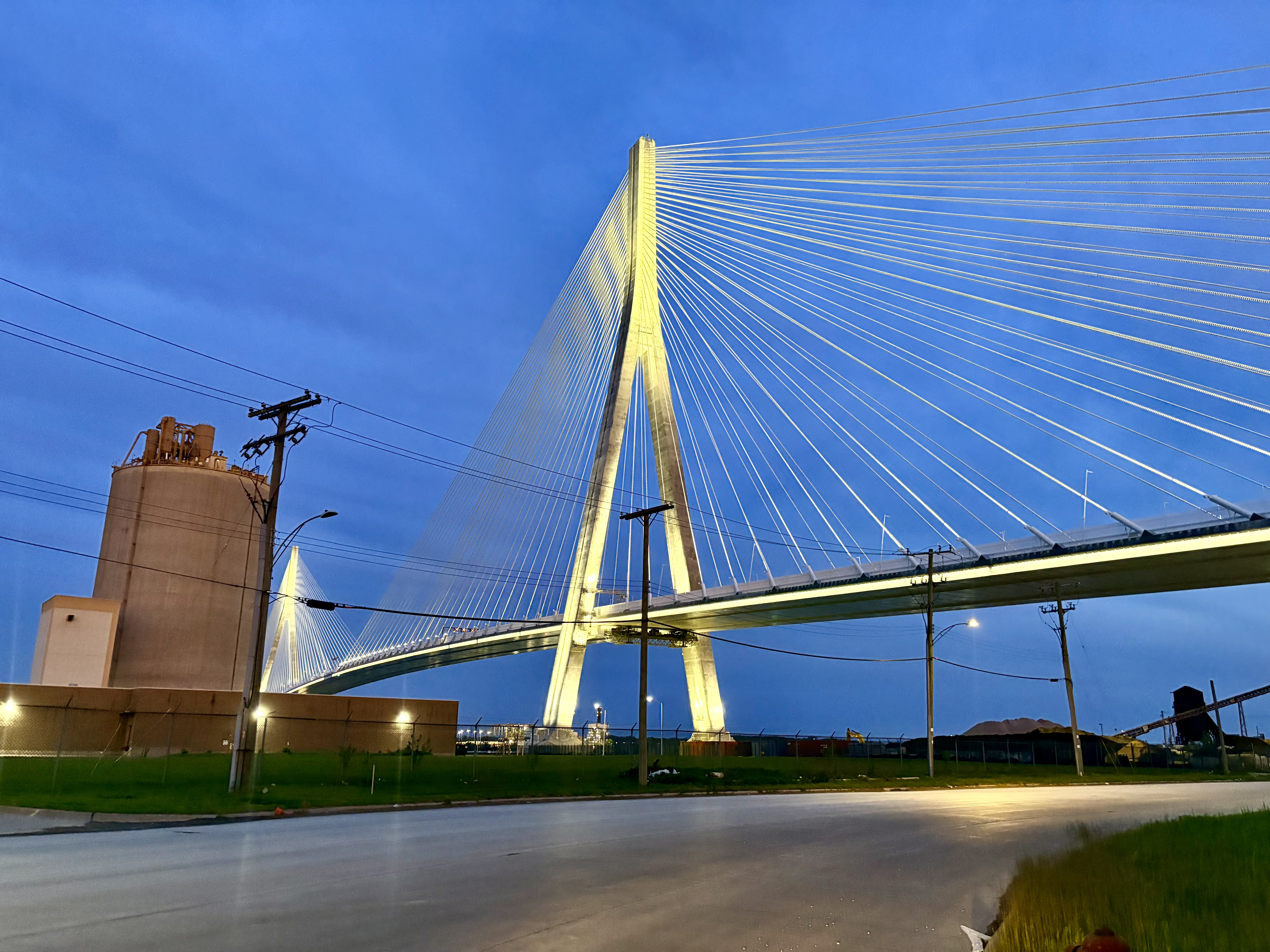
Gordie Howe International Bridge

==== Gordie Howe International Bridge ====
The Gordie Howe International Bridge provides uninterrupted freeway traffic flow between Highway 401 in Ontario and Interstate 75 in Michigan. Construction began in 2018. The CA$3.8 billion cost of construction was funded by the Canadian federal government and will be paid for by bridge tolls. Construction of the bridge was completed in June 2026, inaugurated on July 24, 2026, and opened to traffic on July 27, 2026. The bridge is named after Canadian ice hockey player Gordie Howe, whose celebrated career included 25 years with the Detroit Red Wings, and who died two years before construction began.

=== Major projects 2006–2024 ===
==== Southwestern Ontario ====
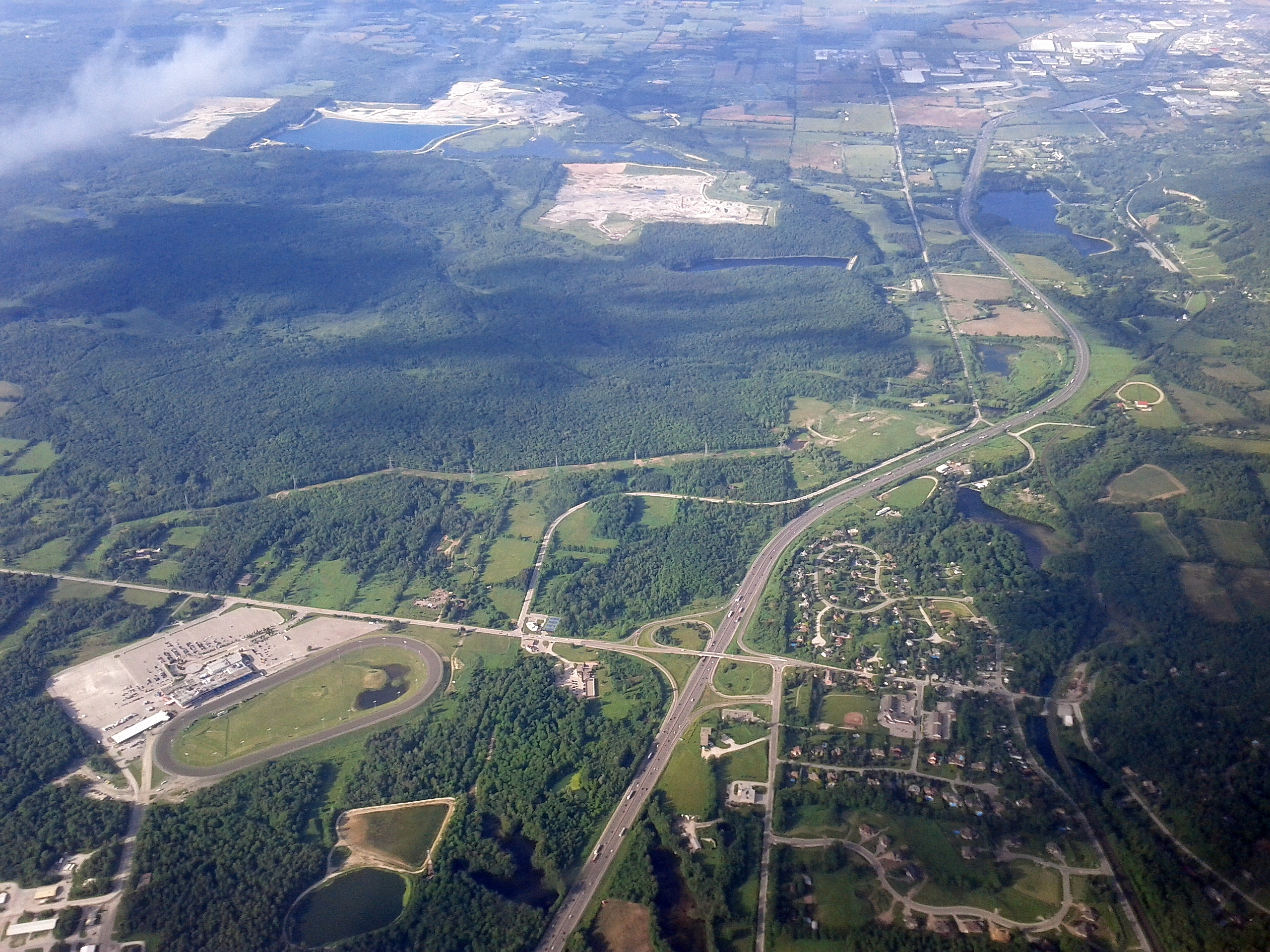
Highway 401 in the Greenbelt, at the interchange with Guelph Line (Halton Regional Road 1). The section of Highway 401 between Highway 8 and Highway 407 ETR is slated to be widened from six to ten lanes, including two HOV lanes.

In Southwestern Ontario, several improvements are under way to provide six lanes on Highway 401 from Windsor to Toronto, in response to the higher-than-average accidents occurring on the "Carnage Alley" stretch including the 1999 Labour Day weekend pileup. West of Essex County Road 42 on the west of Tilbury, the highway has been widened to six lanes with a concrete divider in anticipation of the Rt. Hon. Herb Gray Parkway. As of 2022 the MTO has initiated studies on widening 118 km of the freeway from four to six lanes between Tilbury and London through four contracts.

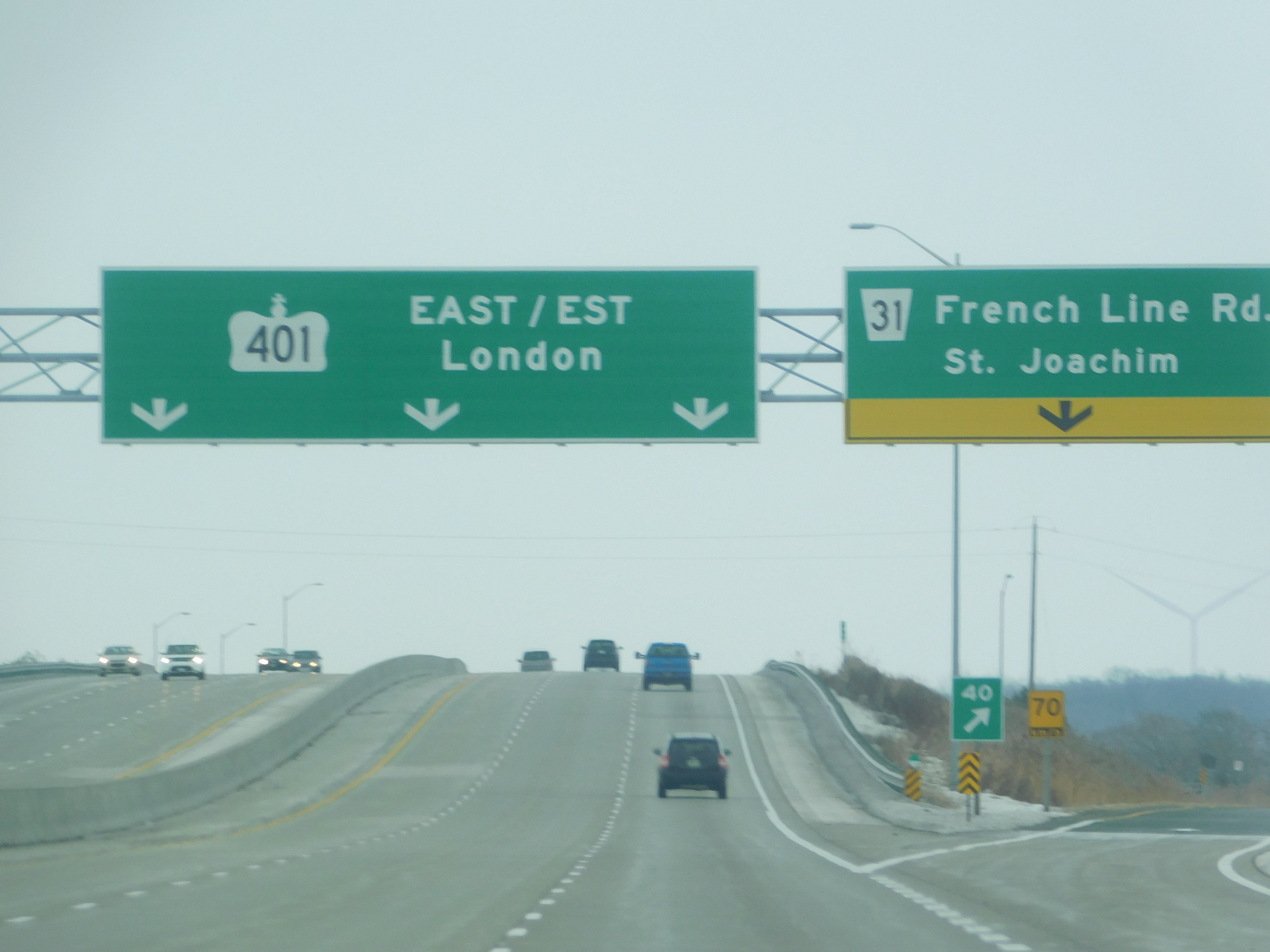
Highway 401 eastbound at the French Line Road interchange

Around London the traffic volumes are expected to increase considerably, so the province established an extensive plan to widen and reconstruct the London corridor between 2006 and 2021. This included building a new interchange with Wonderland Road which opened in November 2015 to help improve access to Highway 401 westbound from the city's southwest end and involved replacing the Westminster Drive overpass to allow the highway to be widened. A reconstruction of the outdated cloverleaf interchange at Colonel Talbot Road and widening Highway 401 from four to six lanes between Highway 4 and Highway 402 is also proposed. The MTO is also planning on widening Highway 401 from six to eight lanes through part of the London corridor. Alongside the City of London's extension of the Veterans Memorial Parkway (formerly Highway 100 (Airport Road)) from Highway 401 to Wilton Grove Road in 2017, the Parkway's trumpet interchange was reconfigured to a Parclo with the replacement overpass able to accommodate future expansion of Highway 401.

The interchange with Hespeler Road (formerly Highway 24), prior to the widening of Highway 401 from 2019 to 2021. The twin overpasses would be replaced with a longer single bridge to accommodate the freeway's expanded cross-section.

In the Kitchener/Cambridge area, the widening of Highway 401 from six to twelve lanes from Highway 8 (King Street) to Highway/Regional Road 24 (Hespeler Road) commenced on June 8, 2015, and concluded in summer 2019. The second phase of expansion scheduled for 2019–21 saw Highway 401 widened from six to ten lanes between Highway/Regional Road 24 and Townline Road. At the interchange with Hespeler Road (formerly Highway 24), the span carrying northbound traffic which opened in 1989 was torn down on May 1, 2021, with both directions of Hespeler Road traffic temporarily relocated to the overpass originally built in 1960 and designated for southbound drivers since 1989, as a new longer bridge was constructed to accommodate Highway 401's expanded cross-section. The new HOV lanes from Highway 8 to Townline Road opened on December 22, 2023. Just west of the Highway 8 interchange, the freeway's existing six-span Grand River Bridges (opened in 1960, restriped in the early 1990s from two to three lanes per direction) were replaced with two new four-span structures. Ontario completed major construction on the bridges in December 2025. The new Grand River bridges are a prerequisite to the planned expansion of the Y-junction between Highway 401 and Highway 8 Expressway from a partial to an all-directional interchange, with proposed flyover ramps linking eastbound Highway 401 to Waterloo-bound Highway 8 and the opposite movement to bypass the existing non-express connection using King Street.

South of Guelph, between the Hanlon Expressway (signed as Highway 6 North) and the Brock Road (signed as Highway 6 South), the section of Highway 401 between these segments is scheduled to be widened to ten lanes. This is part of a long-term plan for Highway 6 to be rerouted along a potential extension of the Hanlon south of Highway 401 to meet the four lane segment of Highway 6 south of Freelton, bypassing the congested two-lane section of Brock Road in Wellington County from Puslinch to Morriston which runs through several small towns where it lacks sufficient right-of-way for widening.

==== Greater Toronto Area ====
Highway 401 is being widened from six to ten lanes (including HOV lanes) from the Steeles Avenue overpass westerly to 1.5 km west of the Halton-Wellington boundary. As part of this project, the crossing for Tremaine Road (Halton Regional Road 22) has been realigned to a new interchange while the original overpass has been demolished. The existing Guelph Line interchange will also be rebuilt as part of the freeway expansion.

Expansion in Durham includes widening the highway to 12 lanes, and extending the collector-express system from its end at Brock Road in Pickering to Lake Ridge Road in Whitby. A Transportation Environmental Study Report was completed on widening the 401, extending the collector-express system easterly through to the Highway 412 interchange in Whitby, then ten lanes easterly to Liberty Street in the Municipality of Clarington. The assessment was completed in March 2015. To support this widening, all of the original overpasses dating back in the 1940s and 1950s built through Whitby and Oshawa were replaced with new overpasses as part of contemporary highway safety standards and to allow for a future highway widening.

==== Eastern Ontario ====
East of Durham, the MTO widened parts of Highway 401 to six lanes. Two bridges have been widened in advance of an eventual widening to six lanes of the highway including the bridges over the Trent River in Trenton, as well as the Salmon River bridge between Belleville and Napanee. By 2020, the highway was widened to six lanes for 9 km (5.6 mi) through Kingston between exits 611 and 623, 16 years after it started back in 2004. Construction began in 2014 to expand the highway to six lanes approximately five kilometres (3.1 mi) east of exit 474 in Cobourg.

=== Proposed tunnel ===
On September 25, 2024, Premier Doug Ford announced that the Ontario government has launched the technical evaluation for the proposed construction of a new driver and transit tunnel expressway under Highway 401.

== Services ==
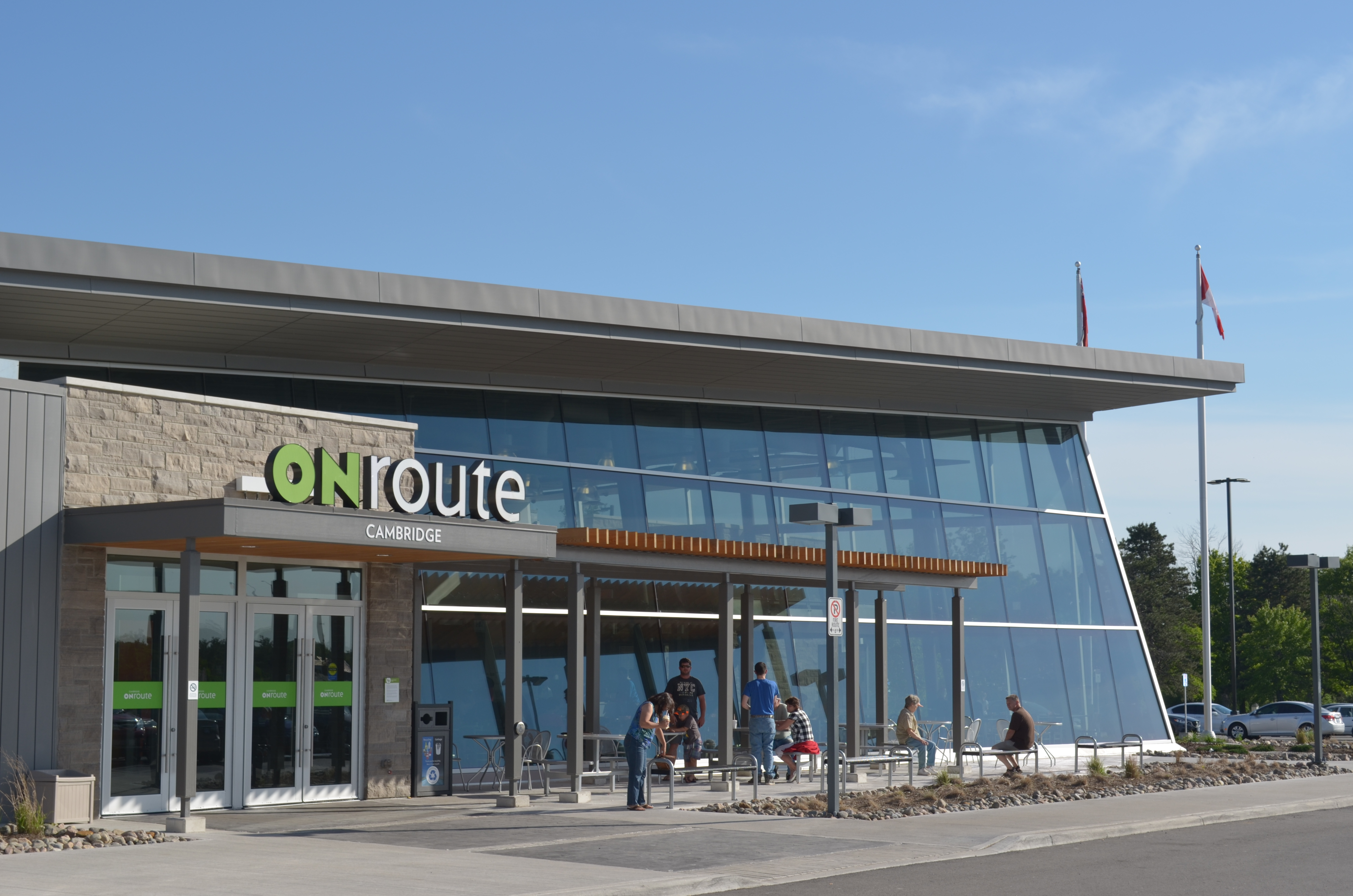
ONroute Cambridge South service station

Highway 401 features 19 ONroute service centres operated under contract from the Ministry of Transportation. They provide a place to park, rest, eat and refuel 24 hours a day.

Service centres along Highway 401 were first announced in 1961 following public outcry over the lack of rest stops. The centres were originally leased to and operated by several major gasoline distributors; however, those companies chose not to renew their leases as the terms ended. The centres were also of an outdated design that could not keep up with growing traffic, despite limited renovations in the early 1990s such as at the Woodstock and Cambridge North/South sites. In response, the MTO put the operation of the full network of service centres out for tender, resulting in a 50-year lease agreement in 2010 with Host Kilmer Service Centres, a joint venture between hospitality company HMSHost (a subsidiary of Autogrill) and investment company Kilmer van Nostrand.

Seventeen of the centres along Highway 401 have been entirely redeveloped. Prior to the deal with Host Kilmer Service Centres, the centres at Newcastle and Ingersoll were rebuilt in the late 1990s and did not require further reconstruction since their design is modern enough. In Mississauga (just east of Winston Churchill Boulevard), a centre with a unique layout opened in 1991 but closed in 2006, being demolished in 2010 to accommodate the freeway's widening to a collector-express system as well as making way for an OPP station. Work on rebuilding 15 of the 17 service centres began in late 2009 or early 2010. The new service centres, opened in phases beginning in July 2010, feature a Canadian Tire gas station, an HMSHost-operated convenience store known as "The Market", as well as fast food brands such as Tim Hortons, A&W, Pizza Pizza, Extreme Pita, KFC, Taco Bell, Big Smoke Burger and Burger King.

Service centres along Highway 401
Location	Direction(s)	Nearby exits	Status
Tilbury North	Westbound	56, 63	Reopened as of October 1, 2010
Tilbury South	Eastbound	56, 63	Reopened as of October 1, 2010
West Lorne	Westbound	137, 149	Reopened as of October 1, 2010
Dutton	Eastbound	137, 149	Reopened as of October 1, 2010
Ingersoll	Westbound	222, 230	
Woodstock	Eastbound	222, 230	Closed for reconstruction on March 31, 2010; reopened July 2011
Cambridge North	Westbound	286, 295	Closed for reconstruction on September 7, 2011; Cambridge North reopened June 25, 2013; Cambridge South reopened July 23, 2013.
Cambridge South	Eastbound	286, 295	Closed for reconstruction on September 7, 2011; Cambridge North reopened June 25, 2013; Cambridge South reopened July 23, 2013.
Mississauga	Eastbound	333, 336	Opened in 1991 as the Mississauga Info Centre serving only passenger vehicle traffic; included tourism info terminals and a business centre. Was leased to Shell. Permanently closed as of September 30, 2006, with building demolished in December 2010. Site redeveloped as the OPP Mississauga Detachment.
Newcastle	Westbound	440, 448	
Port Hope	Eastbound	448, 456	
Trenton North	Westbound	509, 522	Reopened as of October 1, 2010
Trenton South	Eastbound	509, 522	
Napanee	Westbound	582, 593	Temporarily closed for reconstruction in 2010
Odessa	Eastbound	599, 611	
Mallorytown North	Westbound	675	Reopened February 1, 2011
Mallorytown South	Eastbound	685	Reopened June 28, 2012.
Morrisburg	Eastbound	750, 758	Reopened as of October 1, 2010
Ingleside	Westbound	758, 770	Reopened April 2011
Bainsville	Westbound	825	Reopened as of October 1, 2010
Closed/former

== Exit list ==
The following table lists the major junctions along Highway 401, as noted by the Ministry of Transportation of Ontario.

Division	Location	km	mi	Exit	Destinations	Notes
Detroit River; Canada–United States border		0.0	0.0	–	To I-75	Continuation into Detroit, Michigan
Detroit River; Canada–United States border		0.0	0.0	Gordie Howe International Bridge (tolled)		
Detroit River; Canada–United States border		0.0	0.0	Detroit–Windsor Border Crossing		
Windsor		2.0	1.2	1	Ojibway Parkway; E. C. Row Expressway	Former western terminus from November 21, 2015, until the opening of bridge on July 27, 2026
Windsor		3.4	2.1	2	E. C. Row Expressway	Eastbound exit and westbound entrance
Windsor		4.7	2.9	5	Highway 3 (Huron Church Road) – Windsor, Ambassador Bridge, Detroit	Westbound exit and eastbound entrance; former western terminus from June 28 to November 21, 2015
Windsor–Essex boundary	Windsor–LaSalle boundary	5.8	3.6	6	Cabana Road West; County Road 6 (Todd Lane) – LaSalle	Eastbound exit and eastbound entrance, westbound entrance from Highway 3 West
Windsor–Essex boundary	Windsor–LaSalle boundary	7.1	4.4	7	Highway 3 (Talbot Road) – LaSalle, Leamington	Westbound exit to Highway 3 West, eastbound exit to Highway 3 East, eastbound entrance from Highway 3 East
Windsor–Essex boundary	Windsor–LaSalle–Tecumseh boundary	10.1	6.3	10	Highway 3 – Leamington, Windsor; County Road 9 (Howard Avenue) – Amherstburg	Former western terminus from 1957 to June 28, 2015
Windsor–Essex boundary	Windsor–Tecumseh boundary	12.6	7.8	13	Dougall Parkway – Detroit–Windsor tunnel, Detroit	Westbound exit and eastbound entrance; formerly Highway 3B / Highway 401A
Windsor–Essex boundary	Windsor–Tecumseh boundary	13.4	8.3	14	County Road 46 (Provincial Road) to Walker Road (County Road 11)	Formerly Highway 98; to Windsor International Airport
Essex	Tecumseh–Lakeshore boundary	20.4	12.7	21	County Road 19 (Manning Road) – Tecumseh	
Essex	Lakeshore					
Essex	Lakeshore	27.5	17.1	28	County Road 25 (Puce Road) – Puce	
Essex	Lakeshore	33.7	20.9	34	County Road 27 (Belle River Road) – Woodslee, Belle River	
Essex	Lakeshore	40.0	24.9	40	County Road 31 (French Line Road) – St. Joachim	Formerly known as St. Joachim Road
Essex	Lakeshore	47.3	29.4	48	Highway 77 south – Leamington; County Road 35 north (Comber Road) – Stoney Point	Highway 77 northern terminus
Essex	Lakeshore	55.7	34.6	56	County Road 42 – Tilbury	Formerly Highway 2
Chatham-Kent		60.2	37.4	Tilbury ONroute service centres (Eastbound with Ontario Travel Information Centre)		
Chatham-Kent		62.8	39.0	63	Municipal Road 2 (Queen's Line) – Tilbury	Formerly Highway 2
Chatham-Kent		80.9	50.3	81	Municipal Road 27 (Bloomfield Road) – Chatham	
Chatham-Kent		89.3	55.5	90	Highway 40 north / Municipal Road 11 south (Communication Road) – Chatham, Blenheim	Highway 40 southern terminus
Chatham-Kent		101.0	62.8	101	Municipal Road 15 (Kent Bridge Road) – Dresden, Ridgetown	
Chatham-Kent		108.3	67.3	109	Municipal Road 17 north / Municipal Road 21 south (Victoria Road) – Thamesville, Ridgetown	Formerly Highway 21
Chatham-Kent		116.2	72.2	117	Municipal Road 20 (Orford Road) – Highgate	
Elgin	West Elgin	129.2	80.3	129	County Road 103 (Furnival Road) – Wardsville, Rodney	
Elgin	West Elgin	137.3	85.3	137	County Road 76 (Graham Road) – West Lorne	Formerly Highway 76
Elgin	Dutton/Dunwich	143.8	89.4	Dutton (eastbound) and West Lorne (westbound); ONroute service centres		
Elgin	Dutton/Dunwich	148.5	92.3	149	County Road 8 (Currie Road) – Dutton	
Elgin	Dutton/Dunwich–Southwold boundary	157.4	97.8	157	County Road 14 (Iona Road) – Melbourne, Iona	
Elgin	Southwold	164.1	102.0	164	County Road 20 (Union Road) – Port Stanley, Shedden	
London		176.7	109.8	177	Highway 4 south (Colonel Talbot Road) – St. Thomas	Western end of Highway 4 concurrency. Signed as exits 177A (south) and 177B (north); reconstruction planned, turning the cloverleaf interchange into a parclo
London		179.4	111.5	180	Highway 4 north (Wonderland Road)	Eastern end of Highway 4 concurrency. Construction began in early 2014, opened November 2015. Highway 4 north of Highway 401 rerouted along Wonderland Road in 2018 from Colonel Talbot Road.
London		183.2	113.8	183	Highway 402 west – Sarnia	Westbound exit and eastbound entrance; Highway 402 exit 103
London		185.9	115.5	186	Wellington Road – Downtown	reconfigured from cloverleaf interchange into a parclo A4 from 2006 to 2008, westbound exit previously combined with the offramp for Exeter Road (Exit 187); to London Health Sciences Centre
London		186.8	116.1	187	Exeter Road	Westbound exit, formerly Highway 135 west
London		189.1	117.5	189	Highbury Avenue–St. Thomas	Formerly Highway 126
London		193.6	120.3	194	Veterans Memorial Parkway	Formerly Highway 100 and Airport Road; reconstruction and expansion from a three-way trumpet to four-way Parlo interchange begun in 2015; to London International Airport
Middlesex	Thames Centre	195.5	121.5	195	County Road 74 (Westchester Bourne) – Nilestown, Belmont	Formerly Highway 74
Middlesex	Thames Centre	199.3	123.8	199	County Road 32 north (Dorchester Road) – Dorchester	
Middlesex	Thames Centre	203.0	126.1	203	County Road 73 (Elgin Road) – Aylmer	Formerly Highway 73
Middlesex	Thames Centre	208.5	129.6	208	County Road 30 (Putnam Road) – Putnam, Avon	
Oxford	South-West Oxford–Ingersoll boundary	216.0	134.2	216	County Road 10 (Culloden Road)	
Oxford	South-West Oxford–Ingersoll boundary	218.5	135.8	218	Highway 19 south / County Road 119 north (Harris Street) – Tillsonburg	Highway 19 northern terminus
Oxford	South-West Oxford	222.2	138.1	222	County Road 6 – Embro, Stratford	
Oxford	South-West Oxford	223.2– 224.8	138.7– 139.7	Ingersoll (westbound) and Woodstock (eastbound); ONroute service centres		
Oxford	Woodstock	229.8	142.8	230	County Road 12 (Sweaburg Road / Mill Street) – Sweaburg	
Oxford	Woodstock	231.9	144.1	232	County Road 59 – Delhi	Formerly Highway 59
Oxford	Woodstock	235.3	146.2	235	Highway 403 east – Brantford, Hamilton, Niagara Falls	Eastbound exit and westbound entrance
Oxford	Woodstock	236.3	146.8	236	County Road 15 (Towerline Road) – Woodstock	
Oxford	Woodstock	237.9	147.8	238	County Road 2 – Paris, Woodstock	Formerly Highway 2
Oxford	Blandford-Blenheim	250.1	155.4	250	County Road 29 (Drumbo Road) – Innerkip, Drumbo	
Waterloo	North Dumfries	267.9	166.5	268	Regional Road 97 (Cedar Creek Road) – Cambridge, Plattsville, Ayr	Signed as exits 268A (east) and 268B (west) eastbound; formerly Highway 97
Waterloo	Kitchener–Cambridge boundary	275.0	170.9	275	Regional Road 28 (Homer Watson Boulevard / Fountain Street)	
Waterloo	Kitchener–Cambridge boundary	277.9	172.7	278	Regional Road 8 (Shantz Hill Road, King Street) – Cambridge, Kitchener, Waterloo	Signed as exit 278A (east) and 278B (west) eastbound; formerly Highway 8 south; to Cambridge Memorial Hospital
Waterloo	Kitchener–Cambridge boundary	277.9	172.7	278	Highway 8 north – Kitchener, Waterloo	Westbound exit and eastbound entrance
Waterloo	Cambridge	282.5	175.5	282	Regional Road 24 (Hespeler Road) to Highway 24 south – Brantford	Formerly Highway 24
Waterloo	Cambridge	283.8	176.3	284	Regional Road 36 south (Franklin Boulevard)	Eastbound to southbound exit and northbound to westbound entrance
Waterloo–Wellington boundary	Cambridge–Puslinch boundary	286.5	178.0	286	Waterloo Regional Road 33 / Wellington County Road 33 (Townline Road)	
Wellington	Puslinch					
Wellington	Puslinch	289.8	180.1	Cambridge ONroute service centres		
Wellington	Puslinch	295.7	183.7	295	Highway 6 north (Hanlon Expressway) – Guelph	Western end of Highway 6 concurrency
Wellington	Puslinch	300.1	186.5	299	Highway 6 south – Hamilton; County Road 46 north (Brock Road) – Guelph	Eastern end of Highway 6 concurrency
Halton	Milton	311.9	193.8	312	Regional Road 1 (Guelph Line) – Campbellville, Burlington	
Halton	Milton	318.2	197.7	318	Regional Road 22 (Tremaine Road)	Future interchange with realignment of existing road; currently under construction
Halton	Milton	320.1	198.9	320	Regional Road 25 (Martin Street) – Acton, Milton	Formerly Highway 25; signed only as Regional Road 25
Halton	Milton	323.8	201.2	324	Regional Road 4 (James Snow Parkway)	
Halton	Milton–Halton Hills boundary	324.2	201.4	Western end of collector–express system		
Halton	Milton–Halton Hills boundary	328.0	203.8	328	Regional Road 3 (Trafalgar Road) – Halton Hills, Georgetown, Oakville	
Halton	Milton–Halton Hills boundary	329.9	205.0	Eastern end of collector–express system		
Halton–Peel boundary	Milton–Halton Hills–Mississauga boundary	330.4	205.3	330	407 ETR	Tolled; signed as exits 330A (west) and 330B (east) eastbound; no access from westbound Highway 407 to eastbound Highway 401 or westbound Highway 401 to eastbound Highway 407; Highway 407 exit 34
Halton–Peel boundary	Milton–Halton Hills–Mississauga boundary	330.4	205.3	—	Highway 413	Proposed freeway bypass of western Greater Toronto to connect with Highway 400 in Vaughan; connection to be incorporated into the Highway 407 interchange complex
Halton–Peel boundary	Halton Hills–Mississauga boundary	332.7	206.7	333	Regional Road 19 (Winston Churchill Boulevard)	Southern terminus of Regional Road 19 designation
Peel	Mississauga	333.3	207.1	Western end of collector–express system		
Peel	Mississauga	334.2	207.7	Former Mississauga Info Centre (Eastbound); operated from 1991 to 2006 and demolished in 2010		
Peel	Mississauga	336.1	208.8	336	Regional Road 1 (Mississauga Road / Erin Mills Parkway)	Although signed as both the exit for Mississauga Road and Erin Mills Parkway, Erin Mills Parkway merges with Mississauga Road 1.7 km (1.1 mi) to the south and does not officially reach Highway 401
Peel	Mississauga	339.6	211.0	340	Mavis Road	Exit opened in 1999.
Peel	Mississauga	341.7	212.3	342	Hurontario Street	Formerly Highway 10; westbound exit from both collectors and express
Peel	Mississauga	341.7	212.3	342	Whittle Road	Eastbound exit
Peel	Mississauga	344.5– 345.4	214.1– 214.6	344	Via Queen Elizabeth Way via Highway 403 west – Hamilton; Highway 410 north – Brampton	Highway 403 was formerly a partial interchange; full access to and from Highway 403 after new ramps from eastbound Highway 401 to westbound Highway 403 and from eastbound 403 to westbound 401 were opened in 2018
Peel	Mississauga	347.6	216.0	346	Regional Road 4 (Dixie Road)	
Peel–Toronto boundary	Mississauga–Toronto boundary	350.3	217.7	Eastern end of collector–express system		
Peel–Toronto boundary	Mississauga–Toronto boundary	350.3	217.7	348	Renforth Drive	Eastbound exit and westbound entrance
Toronto		350.3– 351.1	217.7– 218.2	348	Highway 427 north – Toronto Pearson International Airport, Vaughan	No access from southbound Highway 427 to eastbound Highway 401 or westbound Highway 401 to northbound Highway 427
Toronto		350.3– 351.1	217.7– 218.2	350	Eglinton Avenue	Eastbound exit and westbound entrance
Toronto		350.3– 351.1	217.7– 218.2	351	Carlingview Drive	Westbound exit and eastbound entrance
Toronto		350.3– 351.1	217.7– 218.2	352	Highway 427 south – Downtown Toronto	Eastbound exit is via exit 348
Toronto		353.5	219.7	354	Dixon Road / Martin Grove Road	No access from southbound Martin Grove to westbound Highway 401; eastbound access to/from Martin Grove via Dixon Road
Toronto		355.4	220.8	355	Highway 409 west to Highway 427 north – Toronto Pearson International Airport; Belfield Road / Kipling Avenue	Westbound exit and eastbound entrance; westbound access to Highway 427 north
Toronto		355.4	220.8	Western end of collector–express system		
Toronto		356.0	221.2	356	Islington Avenue	
Toronto		357.4	222.1	357	Weston Road	
Toronto		358.9	223.0	359	Highway 400 north / Black Creek Drive – Barrie	Eastbound express access to Highway 400; Highway 400 exit 21
Toronto		360.5	224.0	361	Jane Street	Interchange removed; present access to Jane Street via Highway 400
Toronto		362.0	224.9	362	Keele Street	To Humber River Hospital
Toronto		364.0	226.2	364	Dufferin Street, Yorkdale Road	Eastbound exit and westbound entrance
Toronto		364.8	226.7	365	Allen Road, Yorkdale Road	Westbound exit is a left-hand exit from collector lanes, and right-hand exit from express lanes; westbound access to Dufferin Street via Yorkdale Road
Toronto		366.2	227.5	366	Bathurst Street	Westbound exit and eastbound entrance (access only from northbound Bathurst Street); westbound entrance and eastbound exit ramps removed; westbound exits to Wilson Avenue, about 200m west of Bathurst Street
Toronto		367.3	228.2	367	Avenue Road	Formerly Highway 11A
Toronto		368	229	—	Yonge Boulevard	Access to Yonge Boulevard has been removed.
Toronto		369.0	229.3	369	Yonge Street	Formerly Highway 11
Toronto		371.0	230.5	371	Bayview Avenue	
Toronto		372.9	231.7	373	Leslie Street	To North York General Hospital
Toronto		374.9	233.0	375	Highway 404 north – Newmarket; Don Valley Parkway south – Downtown Toronto	Former Woodbine Avenue prior to its reconstruction into the DVP and Highway 404; from eastbound Highway 401, access to Sheppard Avenue via northbound Highway 404 from 401 collector lanes only; Highway 404 exit 17
Toronto		376.3	233.8	376	Victoria Park Avenue	
Toronto		377.6	234.6	378	Warden Avenue	
Toronto		379.2	235.6	379	Kennedy Road	
Toronto		380.4	236.4	—	Midland Avenve	Overpass; no access
Toronto		380.8	236.6	380	Brimley Road south, Progress Avenue	Eastbound exit and westbound entrance from northbound Brimley Road; exit opened on February 18, 1988
Toronto		381.6	237.1	381	McCowan Road	
Toronto		381.6	237.1	381	Corporate Drive	Eastbound entrance
Toronto		383.2	238.1	383	Markham Road	Formerly Highway 48 north
Toronto		383.2	238.1	383	Progress Avenue	Eastbound entrance
Toronto		385.0	239.2	385	Neilson Road	Exit opened in 1983; to Centenary Hospital
Toronto		386.5	240.2	387	Morningside Avenue	
Toronto		389.0	241.7	389	Meadowvale Road	
Toronto		390.3	242.5	390; 392	Kingston Road, Highway 2A, Sheppard Avenue (westbound), Port Union Road (eastbound)	Kingston Road was formerly Highway 2 and is incorrectly signed as 2; Highway 2A was downloaded to the City of Toronto. Signed as exit 390 (eastbound) and exit 392 (westbound)
Durham	Pickering	394.0	244.8	394	Regional Road 38 (Whites Road)	Exit opened in 1983.
Durham	Pickering	396.6	246.4	397	Regional Road 29 (Liverpool Road)	Westbound exit and entrance
Durham	Pickering	398.3	247.5	399	Regional Road 1 (Brock Road)	Exit opened on September 11, 1974, replacing the full-access interchange at Liverpool Road
Durham	Pickering	398.3	247.5	Eastern end of collector–express system		
Durham	Ajax	400.3	248.7	400	Church Street	Removed, exit replaced with Westney Road interchange (exit 401) in 1986
Durham	Ajax	401.3	249.4	401	Regional Road 31 (Westney Road)	Replaced exit 400 (Church Street) in 1986 as part of Go Transit expansion east of Pickering
Durham	Ajax	402.5	250.1	403	Regional Road 44 (Harwood Avenue)	Removed, exit replaced with Salem Road interchange (exit 404) in 2003
Durham	Ajax	404.3	251.2	404	Regional Road 41 (Salem Road)	Replaced exit 403 (Harwood Avenue) in December 2003; to Lakeridge Health Ajax and Pickering
Durham	Ajax–Whitby boundary	406.9	252.8	406	Regional Road 23 (Lake Ridge Road)	Westbound entrance and eastbound exit; construction began in 2013, completed Spring 2016
Durham	Whitby	407.7	253.3	408	Via Highway 407 via Highway 412 north	Former tolled highway; construction began in 2013, completed June 20, 2016
Durham	Whitby	409.6	254.5	410	Brock Street (Regional Road 46) to Regional Highway 12	Formerly Highway 12; Regional Highway 12 begins at Regional Road 28 (Rossland Road) to the north of the interchange, and it runs northward to just south of Highway 407 at the southern end of Highway 12
Durham	Whitby	412.1	256.1	412	Regional Road 26 (Thickson Road)	
Durham	Oshawa	415.2	258.0	415	Regional Road 53 (Stevenson Road)	Replaced exit 416 (Park Road) in 2009
Durham	Oshawa	415.8	258.4	416	Regional Road 54 (Park Road)	Removed, exit replaced with nearby Stevenson Road interchange (exit 415) in 2009
Durham	Oshawa	417.6	259.5	417	Regional Road 2 (Simcoe Street)	Westbound exit via exit 418; to Lakeridge Health Oshawa
Durham	Oshawa	418.5	260.0	418	Regional Road 16 (Ritson Road)	
Durham	Oshawa	419.4	260.6	419	Regional Road 33 (Harmony Road); Regional Road 22 (Bloor Street)	To Regional Road 56 (Farewell Street)
Durham	Clarington	425.4	264.3	425	Regional Road 34 (Courtice Road) – Courtice	
Durham	Clarington	426.5	265.0	426	Via Highway 407 via Highway 418 north	Former tolled highway; construction began in 2016, Opened December 9, 2019
Durham	Clarington	428.4	266.2	428	Holt Road (Darlington Nuclear Generating Station)	Former partial interchange; converted into a full interchange in June 2016.
Durham	Clarington	431.3	268.0	431	Regional Road 57 (Bowmanville Avenue) – Bowmanville	Formerly Waverley Road
Durham	Clarington	432.4	268.7	432	Regional Road 14 (Liberty Street) – Bowmanville, Port Darlington	To Lakeridge Health Bowmanville
Durham	Clarington	435.2	270.4	435	Bennett Road	
Durham	Clarington	436.3	271.1	436	Highway 35 / Highway 115 north – Lindsay, Peterborough	
Durham	Clarington	440.1	273.5	440	Regional Road 17 (Mill Street) – Newcastle, Bond Head	
Durham	Clarington	443.8	275.8	Newcastle ONroute service centre (Westbound)		
Durham	Clarington	448.1	278.4	448	Regional Road 18 (Newtonville Road) – Newtonville	
Northumberland	Port Hope	452.9	281.4	Port Hope ONroute service centre (Eastbound)		
Northumberland	Port Hope	456.6	283.7	456	Wesleyville Road	
Northumberland	Port Hope	461.4	286.7	461	County Road 2 (Toronto Road) – Welcome	Formerly Highway 2
Northumberland	Port Hope	464.8	288.8	464	County Road 28 (Ontario Street) – Bewdley, Peterborough	Formerly Highway 28
Northumberland	Hamilton Township–Cobourg boundary	472.6	293.7	472	County Road 18 (Burnham Street) – Gores Landing	
Northumberland	Hamilton Township–Cobourg boundary	474.5	294.8	474	County Road 45 (Baltimore Road) – Norwood, Baltimore	Formerly Highway 45; signed as exits 474A and 474B eastbound
Northumberland	Alnwick/Haldimand	487.0	302.6	487	County Road 23 (Lyle Street) – Centreton, Grafton	Formerly Aird Street
Northumberland	Cramahe	497.2	308.9	497	County Road 25 (Percy Street / Big Apple Drive) – Colborne, Castleton	
Northumberland	Brighton	509.7	316.7	509	County Road 30 – Brighton	Formerly Highway 30
Quinte West		519.5	322.8	Trenton ONroute service centres		
Quinte West		522.2	324.5	522	Municipal Road 40 (Wooler Road) – Trenton	
Quinte West		525.4	326.5	525	Municipal Road 33 – Trenton, Batawa	Formerly Highway 33
Quinte West		525.4	326.5	Crosses Trent River / Trent–Severn Waterway		
Quinte West		526.5	327.2	526	Municipal Road 4 (Glen Miller Road) – Trenton, CFB Trenton	
Quinte West–Belleville boundary		538.5	334.6	538	Municipal Road 1 (Wallbridge-Loyalist Road) – Stirling	
Belleville		542.7	337.2	543	Highway 62 (North Front Street) – Bloomfield, Madoc	Signed as exits 543A (south) and 543B (north); formerly Highway 14
Belleville		543.2	337.5	544	Highway 37 north (Cannifton Road) – Tweed	
Hastings	Tyendinaga	555.7	345.3	556	Township Road 7 (Shannonville Road) – Shannonville, Tyendinaga Mohawk Territory	
Hastings	Tyendinaga	566.4	351.9	566	Township Road 15 (Marysville Road) to Highway 49 south – Deseronto, Picton, Tyendinaga Mohawk Territory	Formerly Highway 49
Hastings–Lennox and Addington boundary	Tyendinaga–Greater Napanee boundary	570.5	354.5	570	County Road 10 (Deseronto Road) – Deseronto	
Lennox and Addington	Greater Napanee	578.8	359.6	579	County Road 41 (Centre Street) – Napanee, Kaladar	Formerly Highway 41; signed as exits 579A and 579B westbound
Lennox and Addington	Greater Napanee	582.1	361.7	582	County Road 5 (Palace Road) – Newburgh, Napanee	
Lennox and Addington	Loyalist	591.9	367.8	Greater Napanee ONroute service centre (Westbound)		
Lennox and Addington	Loyalist	593.4	368.7	593	County Road 4 (Camden East Road) – Millhaven, Camden East	Formerly Highway 133
Lennox and Addington	Loyalist	598.8	372.1	599	County Road 6 (Wilton Road) – Yarker, Odessa	
Kingston		603.5	375.0	Odessa ONroute service centre (Eastbound)		
Kingston		610.8	379.5	611	Road 38 (Gardiners Road) – Harrowsmith, Sharbot Lake	Formerly Highway 38
Kingston		613.0	380.9	613	Road 9 (Sydenham Road) – Sydenham	
Kingston		615.3	382.3	615	Sir John A. Macdonald Boulevard	To Kingston General Hospital
Kingston		617.0	383.4	617	Road 10 (Division Street / Perth Road) – Westport	interchange configuration on north side was realigned from Parclo B2 to Parclo A4 in 2009–10
Kingston		619.0	384.6	619	Road 11 (Montreal Street) – Battersea	
Kingston		623.0	387.1	623	Highway 15 north / Road 15 south – CFB Kingston, Smiths Falls, Ottawa	Highway 15 southern terminus
Kingston		631.9	392.6	632	Road 16 (Joyceville Road) – Joyceville	
Leeds and Grenville	Leeds and the Thousand Islands–Gananoque boundary	645.1	400.8	645	County Road 32 – Crosby, Gananoque	Formerly Highway 32
Leeds and Grenville	Leeds and the Thousand Islands–Gananoque boundary	646.7	401.8	647	Thousand Islands Parkway – Ivy Lea, Rockport	Eastbound exit and westbound entrance
Leeds and Grenville	Leeds and the Thousand Islands	647.9	402.6	648	Highway 2 west / County Road 2 east – Gananoque	Eastbound via exit 647
Leeds and Grenville	Leeds and the Thousand Islands	658.8	409.4	659	County Road 3 (Reynolds Road) – Lansdowne, Rockport	
Leeds and Grenville	Leeds and the Thousand Islands	661.0	410.7	661	Highway 137 to I-81 south – Hill Island, Thousand Islands Bridge, Watertown	
Leeds and Grenville	Front of Yonge	675.5	419.7	675	County Road 5 (Mallorytown Road) – Mallorytown, Rockport	
Leeds and Grenville	Front of Yonge	667.3– 671.8	414.6– 417.4	Mallorytown ONroute service centres		
Leeds and Grenville	Front of Yonge–Gananoque boundary	684.7	425.5	685	Thousand Islands Parkway	Westbound exit and eastbound entrance
Leeds and Grenville	Elizabethtown-Kitley	686.7	426.7	687	County Road 2 – Brockville	Formerly Highway 2
Brockville		696.2	432.6	696	County Road 29 (Stewart Boulevard) – Smiths Falls	Formerly Highway 29
Brockville		698.0	433.7	698	North Augusta Road – North Augusta	To County Road 6
Leeds and Grenville	Augusta	704.8	437.9	705	County Road 15 (Maitland Road) – Merrickville, Maitland	
Leeds and Grenville	Prescott	716.2	445.0	716	County Road 18 (Edward Street) – Prescott, Domville	
Leeds and Grenville	Edwardsburgh/Cardinal					
Leeds and Grenville	Edwardsburgh/Cardinal	720.1	447.4	721A	Highway 416 north – Kemptville, Ottawa	Eastbound exit and westbound entrance
Leeds and Grenville	Edwardsburgh/Cardinal	721.2	448.1	721B	Highway 16 to Highway 416 – Johnstown, Kemptville, Ottawa, Bridge to U.S.A., Ogdensburg	Signed as exit 721 westbound; westbound access to Highway 416; to NY 812 / NY 37
Leeds and Grenville	Edwardsburgh/Cardinal	730.0	453.6	730	County Road 22 (Shanly Road) – Cardinal	
Stormont, Dundas and Glengarry	South Dundas	737.8	458.4	738	County Road 1 (Carman Road) – Iroquois	
Stormont, Dundas and Glengarry	South Dundas	750.2	466.2	750	County Road 31 – Morrisburg, Winchester, Ottawa	Formerly Highway 31
Stormont, Dundas and Glengarry	South Dundas	756.4	470.0	Morrisburg ONroute service centre (Eastbound)		
Stormont, Dundas and Glengarry	South Dundas	758.2	471.1	758	Upper Canada Road	
Stormont, Dundas and Glengarry	South Dundas	761.4	473.1	Ingleside ONroute service centre (Westbound)		
Stormont, Dundas and Glengarry	South Stormont	769.5	478.1	770	County Road 14 (Dickinson Drive) – Ingleside	
Stormont, Dundas and Glengarry	South Stormont	777.8	483.3	778	County Road 35 (Moulinette Road) – Long Sault	
Stormont, Dundas and Glengarry	South Stormont	786.4	488.6	786	County Road 33 (Power Dam Drive)	Eastbound exit and westbound entrance
Stormont, Dundas and Glengarry	Cornwall	789.5	490.6	789	Highway 138 (Brookdale Avenue) – Ottawa, Hawkesbury	To Seaway International Bridge and Three Nations Crossing to U.S.A.
Stormont, Dundas and Glengarry	Cornwall	791.8	492.0	792	McConnell Avenue	
Stormont, Dundas and Glengarry	Cornwall–South Glengarry boundary	796.1	494.7	796	County Road 44 (Boundary Road)	
Stormont, Dundas and Glengarry	South Glengarry	804.6	500.0	804	County Road 27 (Summerstown Road) – Summerstown	
Stormont, Dundas and Glengarry	South Glengarry	813.8	505.7	814	County Road 2 / County Road 34 north – Lancaster, Alexandria	Formerly Highway 2 / Highway 34 north
Stormont, Dundas and Glengarry	South Glengarry	825.4	512.9	825	County Road 23 (4th Line Road, Curry Hill Road)	
Stormont, Dundas and Glengarry	South Glengarry	827.2	514.0	Bainsville ONroute service centre (Westbound; with Ontario Travel Information Centre)		
Stormont, Dundas and Glengarry	South Glengarry	828.0	514.5		A-20 east – Montreal	Continuation into Quebec
1.000 mi = 1.609 km; 1.000 km = 0.621 mi: Closed/former; Incomplete access; Tolled; Route transition; Unopened

== See also ==
- Heavy Rescue: 401—a documentary/reality series on Discovery Channel in Canada and The Weather Channel in the United States highlighting the operations of heavy rescue and recovery towing businesses along the highway and nearby roads.
- Southern Ontario Transportation

== General bibliography ==
=== Books ===
- Brown, Ron (1997). Toronto's Lost Villages. Toronto: Polar Bear Press. ISBN 978-1-896757-02-5.
- Butorac, Yvonne (June 1, 1995). Great Exits – The 401. Erin, Ontario: Boston Mills Press. ISBN 978-1-55046-137-4.
- Emery, Claire; Ford, Barbara (1967). From Pathway to Skyway. Burlington, Ontario: Confederation Centennial Committee of Burlington. pp. 179–182. Archived from the original on June 14, 2011.
- Filey, Mike (1994). Toronto sketches 3: the way we were. Toronto: Dundurn Press. pp. 61–62. ISBN 978-1-55002-227-8.
- McIlwraith, Thomas F. (1997). Looking for old Ontario: two centuries of landscape change. Toronto: University of Toronto Press. ISBN 978-0-8020-7658-8.
- '401' The Macdonald–Cartier Freeway. Toronto: Ministry of Transportation and Communications. 1972.
- Shragge, John; Bagnato, Sharon (1984). From Footpaths to Freeways. Toronto: Ontario Ministry of Transportation and Communications, Historical Committee. ISBN 978-0-7743-9388-1.
- Stamp, Robert M. (1987). QEW: Canada's First Superhighway. Erin, Ontario: Boston Mills Press. ISBN 978-0-919783-84-3.

=== Maps ===
- Geomatics Office (2003). Southern Ontario Road Maps (Map). Cartography by Bryan Simmons, Lori-Anne Martin. Ministry of Transportation. Archived from the original on January 7, 2012.
- MapArt (2009). Eastern Ontario (Map). Peter Heiler Ltd. § C59. ISBN 978-1-55368-222-6.
- MapArt (2010). Ontario Back Road Atlas (Map). Peter Heiler Ltd. ISBN 978-1-55198-226-7.
- Perly's (2007). Toronto & area map book (Map). Rand McNally. p. 4. ISBN 978-0-88640-928-9.
