= List of Ontario Tourist Routes =

Official scenic routes of Ontario

This is a List of Ontario Tourist Routes throughout the province, which are designated to highlight places of cultural, environmental, or social importance.

It is currently unknown if the majority of these trails are still listed since many of the provincial highways of Ontario were decommissioned in 1997 and 1998, as the Tourist Trails followed the provincial highways for the majority of their length, although many sections travel along county roads and municipal/local streets as well. Although many municipalities, cities, and counties still sign these tourist routes, others may have chosen to discontinue them with the highways they followed, rendering them as historical footnotes.

== African-Canadian Heritage Tour ==
African-Canadian Heritage Tour logo

The African-Canadian Heritage Tour (ACHT) is a designated trail along several county and city roads, and provincial highways.

The trail starts on Queen Street in the Sandwich neighbourhood of Windsor, Ontario. It turns west at Prince Road, before turning south along Sandwich Street. It curves along Sandwich Parkway to Ojibway Parkway, formerly Highway 18. The trail follows County Road 20 to Amherstburg to County Road 10, which turns onto. It travels east along Middle Side Road towards the community of McGregor.

The route turns north along County Road 9 (Howard Avenue) back to Windsor, Ontario. The ACHT turns east briefly along Highway 3, before turning onto Highway 401 eastbound to exit 28, County Road 25 (Puce Road). From there it travels to the town of Puce. The trail turns east along County Road 22 through Belle River until it meets County Road 42 southeast of the town. The trail turns and follows it through Tilbury, becoming Chatham–Kent Road 2, formerly Highway 2.

The route turns south onto County Road 7 (Merlin Road) through the small community of Fletcher before turning east onto County Road 14 (8th Line). It follows County Road 14 through North Buxton to Highway 40. Upon reaching Highway 40, the trail follows it for 11 km (6.8 mi) through Chatham. It turns right along County Road 29 (Countryview Line) and heads northeast through Turnerville, turning north at County Road 29 (Lindsay Road). It follows this road to its terminus in Dresden, where the Uncle Tom's Cabin Historic Site can be found.

== Algonquin Route ==
The Algonquin Route was a loop north from Highway 401 through Algonquin Park and back. The route started at the Highway 35 / Highway 115 and Highway 401 interchange (exit 436) in Newcastle. At the split of Highway 35/115, the trail follows Highway 35 north through Lindsay and travels along a brief concurrency with Highway 7. It continues north along Highway 35 through Coboconk, Minden, Carnarvon and Dorset to Highway 60. From here, the trail turned east and crosses Algonquin Provincial Park. East of the park, Highway 60 meets Highway 41. The route turned south, passing through Eganville and following Highway 41 south to Napanee. The Algonquin Route was created as part of the Yours to Discover campaign by the Ontario provincial government, beginning in 1980 and continuing through the 1990s. Signage was no longer posted after 1998.

== Bluewater Route ==
Bluewater Route logo

The Bluewater Route follows Highway 21 along the shore of Lake Huron between Highway 402 and Owen Sound. The route passes through the small towns of Grand Bend, Goderich and Kincardine, as well as passing by the Bruce Nuclear Generating Station.

== Deer Trail Route ==
The Deer Trail Route is a circular route in the Algoma Region of northern Ontario. Though it is circular, it has a "starting" point at the junction of Highway 17 and Highway 108 in Serpent River. It follows Highway 108 for its entire length, travelling through Elliot Lake, until the road becomes Highway 639. At the northern terminus of Highway 639, the road then turns back south along Highway 546 to its intersection with Highway 17 in Iron Bridge. From there it travels back along Highway 17 through Blind River, Algoma Mills and Spragge to Serpent River at a total distance of approximately 184 km (114 mi).

The route serves mainly as an access route to wilderness recreation areas such as Mississagi Provincial Park. It also serves as a venue for an annual Deer Trail Studio Tour, a regional arts festival in which various venues along the route display and sell the work of local artists and craftspeople.

== Frontier Route ==
The Frontier Route travels through Northern Ontario from the Manitoba border to Barrie. The route travels along Highway 17 through Kenora, Dryden, Ignace, and Thunder Bay to the Highway 11 intersection in Nipigon.

From there, the Route follows Highway 11 across northern Ontario and south through Muskoka. It passes through the towns of Geraldton, Longlac, Hearst, Kapuskasing, Smooth Rock Falls, Cochrane, Iroquois Falls, Kirkland Lake, New Liskeard, North Bay, Huntsville, Bracebridge, Gravenhurst, and Orillia, before terminating at Highway 400 in Barrie. Until Highway 11 was decommissioned as a provincial highway south of Barrie, it continued south to the Gardiner Expressway in downtown Toronto.

This trail also follows the Voyageur Route for a portion of its length.

== Georgian Bay Coastal Route ==
The Georgian Bay Coastal Route is a signed route around the Georgian Bay The MS Chi-Cheemaun Ferry connects Manitoulin Island to Tobermory

== Golden Highway ==
The Golden Highway travels through Northern Ontario and the Abitibi-Témiscamingue region of Quebec It begins in Timmins along Highway 101, and progresses east to Highway 11 in Matheson. It heads south on Highway 11 to Kenogami Lake, then turns east towards Kirkland Lake and the Quebec boundary along Highway 66. A branch also travels west along Highway 66 from Kenogami Lake to Matachewan. Thus, the entire length of Highway 66 is part of the Golden Highway.

The Golden Highway continues in Quebec as Route 117 through the city of Rouyn-Noranda before terminating in Val-d'Or.

== Great River Road ==
The Great River Road loops through the northwestern section of the province. It begins in Kenora and travels east along Highway 17 to Highway 71, where it heads south, staying close to Lake of the Woods. It meets Highway 11 in Barwick, branching into two directions: one spur travels west along Highway 11 to Rainy River, while the main route travels east along Highway 11 to Fort Frances.

The eastern branch continues to Highway 502, travelling back up towards Dryden, and looping back west along Highway 17 to Kenora.

== Heritage Highway ==
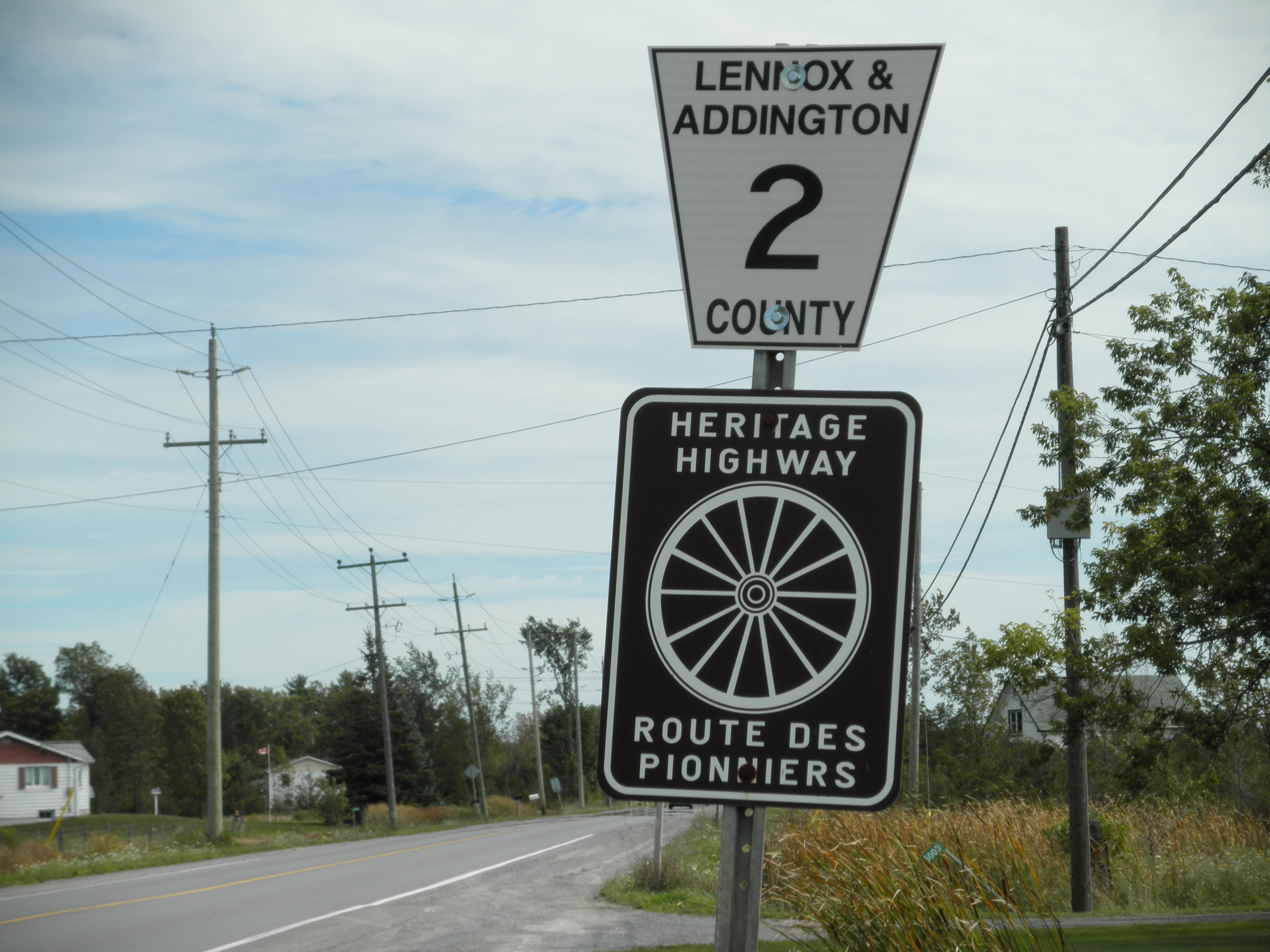
Heritage Highway logo

The Heritage Highway, also known as Historic Highway, travels from Windsor to Gaspé, Quebec along much of what was formerly Highway 2 and Quebec Route 2, now Route 138 (Chemin du Roy) and Route 132. The 1972 designation originally included various spur routes and connections to destinations such as Niagara Falls, Stratford, Sarnia, Ottawa-Hull and Sault Ste. Marie.

One spur continued along the Detroit River on Highway 18, now Essex County Road 20. It followed the northern shore of Lake Erie east to Leamington. It then continued along Highway 3 to Wainfleet, before terminating at Fort Erie. Another spur along Highway 11 met Highway 17, the Voyageur Route east and west to Montreal and Sault Ste. Marie. Much of the original signage is now gone, but a few signs remain on the routes, with one sign in Harrow on County Road 20. Until 1997, there were a few signs along former Highway 3 alignment near the Cottam and Essex areas.

As the route is now mostly county road, signage has been maintained in some areas, removed in some and left to simply fade to illegibility in others. In some areas where the signed route is concurrent with other posted tourist routes, markers for newly designated routes have displaced the "Heritage Highway" wheel. One such example is Trenton where on Highways 2 and 33 the Heritage Highway and Loyalist Parkway run concurrently with other signed tourist routes including a former Apple Route (to Brighton), a segment of the Wine Route (to Picton) and the Hastings County Arts Route (through Belleville).

Recent signage bears a white-on-brown wheel and the words "Heritage Highway - Route des Pionniers", the latter being a version of the French language translation of "Heritage Highways, Sur la Route des Pionniers" used in the original 1972 joint promotional effort with Québec.

== Lake Nipissing Circle Tour ==
The Lake Nipissing Circle Tour is a tourist route that travels around Lake Nipissing. It follows Highway 11 from an intersection with former Highway 11B to the interchange with Highway 654 just south of Callander. It then follows Highway 534 to Carr, where it turns on to the short Highway 524. At the end of that highway, it follows Highway 522 to Highway 69. At Alban, it turns on to Highway 64, before turning on to Highway 17 near Sturgeon Falls and following it to North Bay. Once it meets the former Highway 17B, it turns down that road (Main Street), following it to the southern intersection with former Highway 11B.

== Loyalist Parkway ==
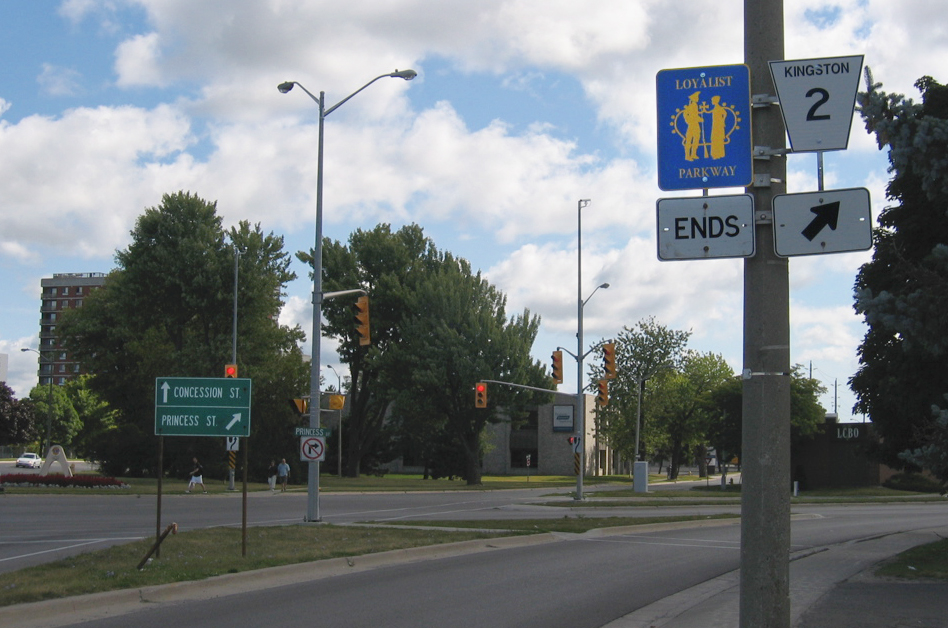
Eastern terminus of Loyalist Parkway and Kingston Road 33 in Kingston

A section of Highway 33 between Amherstview and Trenton was designated the Loyalist Parkway in 1984. This designation was made to honour the United Empire Loyalists, who first settled that area of Ontario. The official designation was presided over by Queen Elizabeth II, when she visited Kingston during Ontario's bicentennial celebrations. Highway 33 now ends at Bloomfield, and the Loyalist Parkway continues as Prince Edward County Road 33 toward Stirling.

== Oil Heritage Route ==
The Oil Heritage Route travels along Lambton County Road 21, formerly Highway 21, from its interchange with Highway 402, through Wyoming, Petrolia, Oil City and Oil Springs. It then curves east then south to Dresden, meeting the African-Canadian Heritage Tour route.

This route is still signed, Lambton CR 21's name north of Rutherford is "Oil Heritage Road".

== Talbot Trail ==
Talbot Trail logo

New sign standards being erected in Elgin County, Ontario bear this logo

The Talbot Trail is an historically significant overland route completed in the 1820s along the north shore of Lake Erie. The building of the route of almost 500 km (310 mi) in length was overseen by Colonel Thomas Talbot. It was originally a corduroy road, eventually becoming Highway 3 and several numbered county roads. Its original intent was to provide a continuous land route for settlers and military personnel between the Niagara region and Detroit, aiding in the development of the Talbot Settlement.

The route begins in Windsor and travels southeast and then east through Leamington, Wheatley, Blenheim and St. Thomas. East of Aylmer, it leaves Highway 3 and follows County Road 38 (Heritage Line) proceeding through the village of Straffordville. It continues to Courtland, where it rejoins Highway 3. The route proceeds east along Highway 3 through Delhi, Simcoe, Jarvis and Cayuga. At Dunnville, the route splits from Highway 3 and follows County Road 3 (Lakeshore Road) through the tiny communities of Stromness, Lowbanks, Long Beach and Camelot Beach, before rejoining Highway 3 near Wainfleet. It proceeds east along Highway 3, terminating at the Niagara River in Fort Erie.

The actual 19th century settlement road began in Amherstburg and ended in Canborough, north of Dunnville, where existing settlement roads provided a route to Fort Erie and Niagara Falls.

== Terry Fox Courage Highway ==
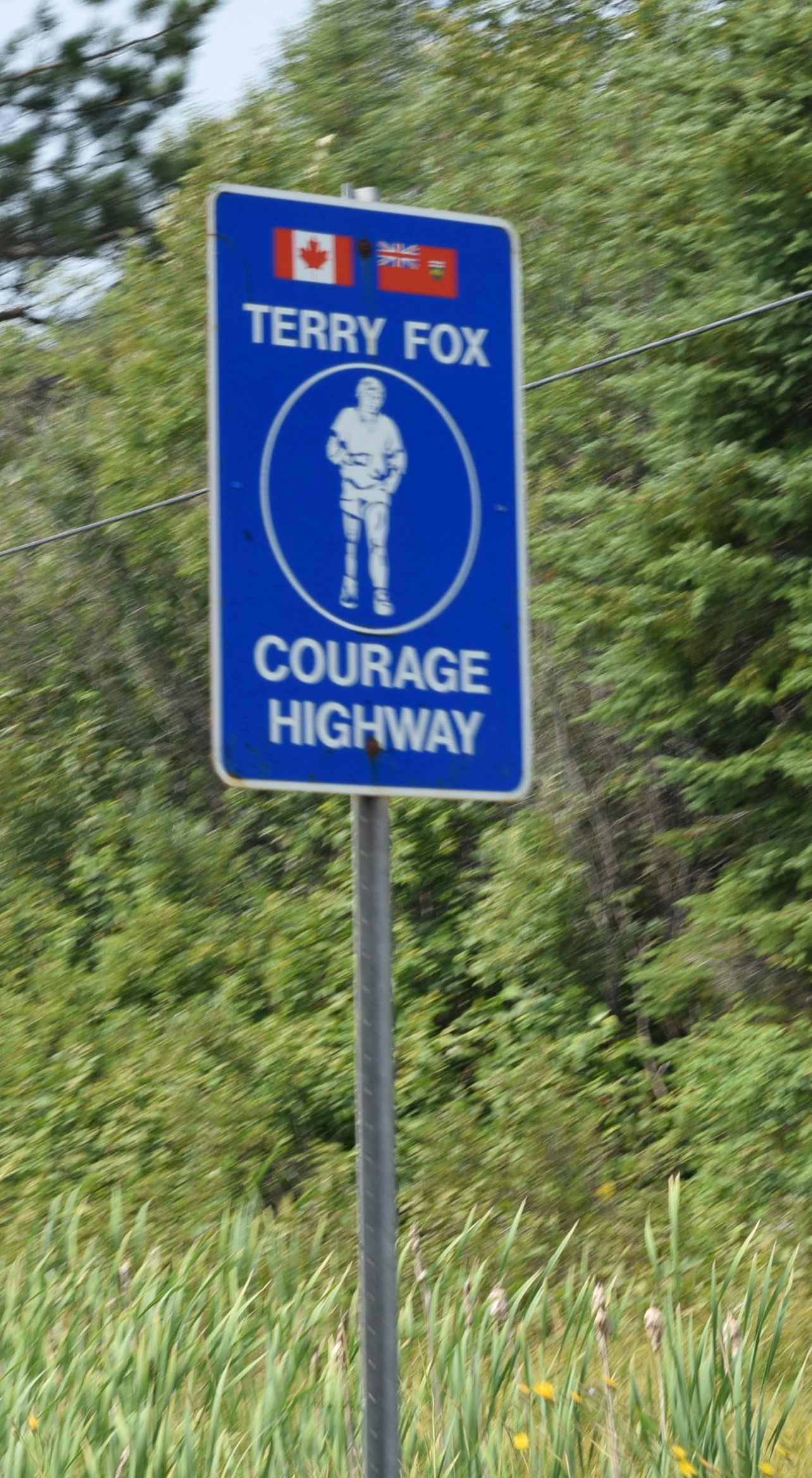
Road sign marking the Terry Fox Courage Highway

The Terry Fox Courage Highway was designated on July 30, 1981 in honour of Terry Fox, whose Marathon of Hope reached as far as Thunder Bay and who died a month prior. The route begins there and follows Highway 11 and Highway 17 for 83 km (52 mi) to Nipigon. It travels northeast along the shore of Lake Superior, and also forms part of the Lake Superior Circle Tour.

The route is well signed throughout its length.

== Voyageur Route ==
The Voyageur Route crosses Ontario, starting at the Manitoba border on Highway 17. It passes through Kenora and continues to Highway 71. It turns south, following Highway 71 for its entire length to Highway 11 between Barwick and Emo. It follows Highway 11 to Shabaqua Corners, Ontario, where it rejoins Highway 17. From there, the route continues east through Thunder Bay, over Lake Superior and Lake Huron to Sudbury and onward to Arnprior. The route ends where Highway 17 transitions to Highway 417. This route may no longer be signed, particularly on parts east of Pembroke, Ontario and in Northwestern Ontario.

The route also shares much of its routing with the Frontier Route, Great River Road, and Heritage Highway. The voyageurs were ordinary workman of the fur trade.

== Welland Canal Route ==
The Welland Canal Route is designated along provincial highways and Regional Roads in Niagara Region along the Welland Canal.

The trail starts at the Queen Elizabeth Way and Highway 406 interchange in St. Catharines, traveling south to Highway 58 in Thorold. The Welland Canal Route travels under the canal, following Highway 58 to the intersection of Highway 20, Niagara Regional Road 82 (Allanport Road), and Niagara Regional Road 20 (Canboro Road). The route turns onto Canboro Road, crossing back over the Canal towards Highway 406. It then turns south along Highway 406 to Main Street in Welland, where it turns east and passes beneath the canal again. It follows Highway 140 south to Highway 58A, which it follows beneath the canal for the final time. The route turns south at Highway 58 and travels south Niagara Regional Road 3, formerly part of nearby Highway 3 in Port Colborne.

== Wine Route ==
Wine Route logo

The Wine Route is signed in several different segments in Southern Ontario, ranging from Essex County, to the Niagara region, and to the northern shore of Lake Ontario. It is still signed to this day, and promoted in newspapers and other media.

The Wine Route starts in Windsor, Ontario, and travels down Essex County Road 20, formerly Highway 18, through LaSalle, Ontario and Amherstburg, Ontario. It continues through Harrow, Ontario, before branching off to the ferry docks in Kingsville, Ontario, serving Pelee Island's Pelee Island Winery via a ferry crossing. The trail continues on Pelee Island, and along County Road 20 on the mainland; both meet in Leamington, Ontario at the intersection of Seacliffe Drive and Erie Street, formerly part of Highway 77.

The wine route designation continues, unsigned, north to and along Highway 77 to Highway 401. From there it travels east to Highway 403 in Woodstock, Ontario, which it continues along to Hamilton, Ontario and the rest of the Niagara Peninsula.

Through the Niagara Region, the route is designated as the Niagara Wine Route, and while well-signed, exists in the form of loops and spurs connecting the various wineries to the communities of the region. The trunk route follows Niagara Regional Road 81, formerly Highway 8 from Grimsby eastward, where in western St. Catharines it diverges into two primary routes.

The first route travels north along Regional Road 34, then turns east, following the shore of Lake Ontario along Regional Road 87 and passing through Port Dalhousie and many of the wineries along the lakeshore. The other route passes along the edge of the Niagara Escarpment and through Niagara-on-the-Lake along Regional Roads 69, 100 and 55. A spur along Fourth Avenue and Ontario Street connects wineries in the west-end of the city and Downtown St. Catharines to the northern route, while another spur crosses through central Niagara-on-the-Lake and the community of Virgil, connecting both routes to the Niagara Parkway. The primary routes reconvene in the Olde Town of Niagara-on-the-Lake where Regional Roads 89 and 55 meet, not far from the mouth of the Niagara River.

A wine route also exists along Highways 33, Highway 62 and Highway 49 in Prince Edward County.

Newer signs are purely dark blue with white grapes, with the text "Wine Route" written below. These new signs are seen throughout Niagara Region and Prince Edward County.

== Rideau Heritage Route ==
The Rideau Heritage Route (français: Circuit patrimonial Rideau) links Ottawa with Kingston via Smiths Falls and Perth. The route is found in Eastern Ontario, along the oldest continuously operated canal in North America. The locks work today much as they did when first opened in 1832. They are a National Historic Site of Canada and a UNESCO world heritage site.

== See also ==
- Great Lakes Circle Tour
