= Ontario Highway 14 =

Former Ontario provincial highway

King's Highway 14
- A map of Highway 14; Highway 14 Portion renumbered as Highway 62; Stirling Connecting Link Bypassed sections of original route

Route information
- Maintained by Hastings County and various towns and townships
- Length: 36.1 km (22.4 mi)
- Existed: May 18, 1921–June 5, 1996

Major junctions
- South end: Highway 62 in Foxboro
- Highway 33 in Stirling
- North end: Highway 7 in Marmora

Location
- Country: Canada
- Province: Ontario
- Counties: Hastings County
- Towns: Foxboro, Stirling, Marmora

Highway system
- Ontario provincial highways; Current; Former; 400-series
← Highway 12	→ Highway 15
Former provincial highways
← Highway 12B	Highway 15A →

King's Highway 14, commonly referred to as Highway 14, was a provincially maintained highway in the Canadian province of Ontario. At its peak length, the route connected Highway 33 in Bloomfield, near Picton, with Highway 7 in Marmora. Portions of this longer route are now designated as Highway 62. Prior to being decommissioned, the route connected Highway 62 in Foxboro with Highway 7 in Marmora, via Stirling.

What became Highway 14 was designated as part of the original Ontario Highway System in 1920. The route, connecting Picton, Belleville and Foxboro, was officially established in May 1921 and numbered in mid-1925. It was extended north to Marmora in 1928, and remained generally unchanged over the next fifty years. In 1982, the Norris Whitney Bridge was opened over the Bay of Quinte. Consequently, the section of Highway 14 south of Foxboro was renumbered as Highway 62. The remainder of the highway was decommissioned on June 5, 1996, the only of the original fifteen 1925 highways to have its number completely removed from the provincial highway system.

== Route description ==
Prior to being decommissioned in the 1990s, Highway 14 connected the towns of Foxboro, Stirling and Marmora, entirely within Hastings County. As the route existed in the early 1990s, it begins in the south at an intersection with Highway 62, the Foxboro Bypass, and proceeds west as the Foxboro–Stirling Road through the municipality of Quinte West. It travels through a highly populated rural region, passing through the community of Chatterton, where it turns north. It meanders north and northeast through a mix of farmland and forests, passing the community of Oak Lake. As it enters the town of Stirling, the road curves west and crosses Rawdon Creek as Front Street East. At the five-way intersection of North Street and Mill Street, former Highway 14 turns north and follows the Stirling–Marmora Road, which carries the route northward into the farmed countryside.

After travelling through the community of Sine, the road runs parallel to Hoards Creek. The creek remains on the west side of the route north to its headwaters as the road passes through Harold, Springbrook and Bonarlaw. From there, the former highway curves northeast until it enters the town of Marmora, where it is known as Forsyth Street. It ends at Highway 7 (Matthew Street); beyond there, the roadway becomes Hastings County Road 48, which continues north to Cordova Mines.

== History ==
Highway 14 was one of the original provincial highways created by the Department of Public Highways (DPHO), predecessor to the modern Ministry of Transportation of Ontario (MTO), in order to qualify for funding under the Canada Highways Act. Two roads in Eastern Ontario, the Belleville–Picton road, and the Foxboro-Belleville Road, were assumed by the DPHO on May 18, 1921. Its routing led from the town of Picton, to the town of Foxboro, via Bloomfield. At first, the road was not given a route number, and was simply referred to as the Foxboro-Picton Highway. It was designated as Highway 14 during the summer of 1925. Most of the road was paved by 1925; the last gravel sections – south of Belleville between Bloomfield and Prince Edward County Road 4, and between Mountainview and Rossmore – were paved in 1926. At this point, the road was 46.7 km (29.0 mi) in length.

The Department of Highways took control of several roads though the townships of Thurlow, Sidney, Rawdon and Marmora on April 18, 1928, extending Highway 14 north to Highway 7 in the village of Marmora. This brought the length of the route to 82.7 km (51.4 mi). The new portion of the highway was entirely unpaved when it was assumed. Paving began in 1937 through and northwards from Stirling, with the first 11.3 km (7 mi) to the hamlet of Harold being completed that year. The remainder, between Harold and Marmora, was paved the following year. The final unpaved section, between Foxboro and Stirling, was completed in 1940.

A bypass was opened around Foxboro in late 1963. The Norris Whitney Bridge over the Bay of Quinte, south of Belleville, was opened in December 1982, replacing the original 1891 swing bridge. Portions of the original causeway can still be seen alongside the current structure. Shortly thereafter, by 1984, the section of Highway 14 south of Foxboro to Highway 33 at Bloomfield was renumbered as part of Highway 62. The length of the highway was now 36.1 km (22.4 mi).

Highway 14 was eliminated, or downloaded, from the provincial highway network to the County of Hastings on June 5, 1996, alongside the downloading of Highway 33 and the portion of Highway 2 within Hastings County. The road became Hastings County Road 14, but the County of Hastings then downloaded the county road (and the responsibilities of its maintenance) to its constituent towns and townships on January 1, 1998. Since 1998 the road has been known as Stirling-Rawdon Road 14, and Marmora & Lake Road 14.

== Major intersections ==
The following table lists the major junctions along Highway 14. The entire route was located in Hastings County.

Location	km	mi	Destinations	Notes
Foxboro	0.0	0.0	Highway 62 – Belleville, Picton	
Quinte West	3.2	2.0	County Road 1 (Wallbridge Loyalist Road)	
Stirling	10.9	6.8		Beginning of former Stirling Connecting Link agreement
Stirling	11.9	7.4	County Road 8 (Front Street / Mill Street)	Former northern terminus of Highway 33
Stirling	12.7	7.9		End of former Stirling Connecting Link agreement
Stirling-Rawdon	19.9	12.4	County Road 19 (Wellmans Road) – Wellman	
Stirling-Rawdon	24.8	15.4	County Road 38 (Spring Brook Road) – Crookston	
Marmora	35.3	21.9		Former Marmora Connecting Link agreement
Marmora	36.1	22.4	Highway 7 (Matthew Street) – Havelock, Madoc	Former Marmora Connecting Link agreement
1.000 mi = 1.609 km; 1.000 km = 0.621 mi
