= Foxboro =

Foxboro or Foxborough may refer to:

- Foxboro, Ontario, a community in Hastings County, Ontario
- Foxborough, Massachusetts, a town in Norfolk County, Massachusetts
  - Foxboro station, in the town
- Foxboro, Wisconsin, an unincorporated community in Douglas County, Wisconsin
- Foxboro Company, a control systems company headquartered in Foxborough, Massachusetts
- Foxboro Stadium, defunct stadium in Foxborough, Massachusetts
