= Ontario Highway 33 =

Ontario provincial highway

Highway 33
- Loyalist Parkway

Route information
- Maintained by the Ministry of Transportation of Ontario
- Length: 60.9 km (37.8 mi)
- Existed: July 9, 1930–present

Major junctions
- West end: Highway 62 in Bloomfield
- East end: Collins Bay Road in Kingston

Location
- Country: Canada
- Province: Ontario

Highway system
- Ontario provincial highways; Current; Former; 400-series
| ← Highway 28 | → Highway 34 |
Former provincial highways
| ← Highway 32 |

King's Highway 33, commonly referred to as Highway 33 or Loyalist Parkway, is a provincially maintained highway in the Canadian province of Ontario. The route begins at Highway 62 in Bloomfield and travels east to the Collins Bay Road junction at Collins Bay in the city of Kingston, a distance of 60.9 kilometres (37.8 mi). The highway continues farther east into Kingston as Bath Road (Kingston Road 33), ending at the former Highway 2, now Princess Street. Highway 33 is divided into two sections by the Bay of Quinte. The Glenora Ferry service crosses between the two sections just east of Picton, transporting vehicles and pedestrians for free throughout the year.

Originally, Highway 33 continued northeast through Trenton to the town of Stirling, ending at a junction with Highway 14. This section was transferred to county governments by the beginning of 1998. In 2009, Highway 33 west of Picton became the site of the first modern roundabout on a provincial highway.

In 1984, Queen Elizabeth commemorated Highway 33 between Trenton and Kingston as the Loyalist Parkway at a ceremony in Amherstview in honour of the settlers that landed there in 1784.

== Route description ==
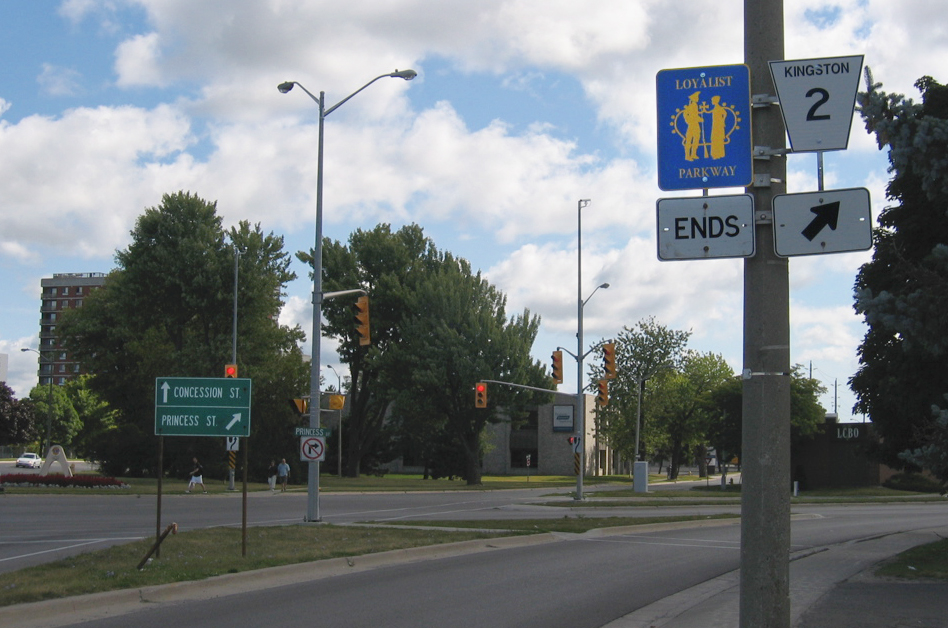
Eastern terminus of Loyalist Parkway and Kingston Road 33 in Kingston

Highway 33, known as the Loyalist Parkway throughout its length, begins in the west at the southern terminus of Highway 62, west of which the parkway continues as Prince Edward County Road 33 to Trenton. The route begins within the community of Bloomfield. To the east it crosses several creeks then intersects Prince Edward County Road 1 at the first modern provincially maintained roundabout. East of this, the highway enters into the city of Picton.

Within Picton, Highway 33 intersects the former Highway 49, now Prince Edward County Road 49. It exits the city and follows the southeastern shoreline of Picton Bay, passing the H.J. McFarland Conservation Area midway between the city and Glenora.

Glenora–Adolphustown Ferry service
mid-May – September
| 6:00 am – 10:00 am 7:30 pm – 1:15 am | 30-minute service |
| 10:15 am – 7:30 pm | 15-minute service |
Winter
| 6:00 am – 1:15 am | 30-minute service |

Highway 33 has two sections, which are joined by the Glenora Ferry, an auto ferry crossing the Bay of Quinte from Glenora to Adolphustown. The Ministry of Transportation of Ontario (MTO), which maintains Highway 33, also provides the ferry service free of charge. The eastern section of the highway begins west of Adolphustown, where it passes by several Loyalist heritage sites. Now in the county of Lennox and Addington, the route remains close to the shores of the Bay of Quinte for the remainder of its journey towards Kingston. It divides the Greater Napanee communities of Conway, South Fredericksburg, Parma, Sandhurst Shores and Sandhurst, then enters the municipality of Loyalist opposite Amherst Island. The highway passes through Bath, after which it follows the Bath Road, one of the oldest roads in Ontario, built circa 1785. At Millhaven, a ferry service provides access to Amherst Island; Highway 33 continues east and passes through Amherstview before crossing the county line into Frontenac County and the City of Kingston.

The short section of Highway 33 within Kingston travels as far east as Collins Bay Road, in the community of Collins Bay. From this point, the road continues east as Bath Road (Kingston City Road 33), ending at Princess Street, formerly Highway 2.

Highway 33 is 60.9 kilometres (37.8 mi) in length, excluding the length of the Glenora Ferry. Traffic volumes vary considerably throughout the length of the route. On an average day, over 5,000 vehicles travel the section between Bloomfield and Picton. Between Picton and the Glenora Ferry, volumes drop to under 2,000. On the opposite shore, traffic volumes grow from over 6,000 near Bath to over 11,000 outside of Kingston.

== History ==
Highway 33, also known since 1984 as the Loyalist Parkway, follows a pioneer colonial route on which the first segments were built two hundred years prior. The route connects several historical settlement sites in Prince Edward County, continuing east through Bath to what is now Kingston.

In 1784, following the American Revolution, the United Empire Loyalists began to arrive in Upper Canada, hoping to settle the frontier near Cataraqui (now Kingston). With the help of the military, the loyalists blazed a trail west from Cataraqui to Bath, a distance of 25 kilometres (16 mi). This trail would become a section of Highway 33 nearly 150 years later.

On June 5, 1799, Asa Danforth Jr. began construction eastward from Toronto on a road which was to extend the Governor's Road through Port Hope and to the Trent River. That road, completed in 1801, would be described by acting surveyor general William Chewett to be "good" for use in the dead of winter but "impassible" during the wet summers, when the path turned to a bottomless mud pit. It would be extended in 1802 to reach the Bay of Quinte at Stone Mills (now Glenora) and a ferry crossing established to Adolphustown. The Bath extension of the Danforth Road (1802) provided access to a key early colonial road, the Bath Road, which had long joined Bath to Kingston.

Sporadic privately operated ferry services between Adolphustown and Stone Mills (Glenora) were initially a primitive affair. In October 1835 a Mr. Clark from Cobourg tipped out of the bark canoe ferrying him to Glenora and was buried without an inquest; a year earlier, a Rev. Mathew Miller from Cobourg had drowned after falling through the February ice. The road itself was no better, barely adequate for horse and rider but unfit to run stagecoach lines.

This road would serve as the initial mail road linking Kingston to Toronto, but was poorly maintained and soon allowed to fall into disrepair. By 1817, the Kingston Road replaced or bypassed much of Danforth's Road, following a similar path to the Trent River (with minor improvements in routing around Scarborough, Port Hope, Cobourg and Grafton) but then blazing a more northerly route through Belleville and Napanee. Like the Danforth Road before it, this 1817 York Road was initially a muddy dirt road; it would, however, suffice to establish reliable scheduled stagecoach runs by which mail and passengers could make the two-day trip from Kingston to Toronto and permit enterprises (such as the branches of the newly established Bank of Montreal) safe and timely delivery of documents and valuables. By 1839, the Napanee-Kingston route was being improved for use as a gravel toll road.

While the area around Bath and the Bay of Quinte would remain a major agricultural region, the pattern of redirecting Kingston-Toronto traffic further inland which started with construction of the Kingston Road (1817) would be repeated with the Grand Trunk Railway (1856) and ultimately Highway 401 (1964).

Due to its historic role in early colonisation and its prime waterfront scenic location, the original route from Kingston westward through Bath and the Quinte Region would be commemorated in 1984 by Queen Elizabeth as the Loyalist Parkway.

Ironically, the first section of Highway 33 to be assumed as provincial highway is not part of the commemorated Loyalist Parkway. On July 9, 1930, the Department of Highways assumed the Trenton–Stirling Road as King's Highway 33, a distance of approximately 25 kilometres (16 mi). In July 1934, as part of a depression-relief effort, the Carrying Place Trail through Prince Edward County and the United Counties of Lennox and Addington was assumed as an extension of Highway 33. (The section between Trenton and Glenora was assumed on July 4, 1934, the section between Adolphustown and Kingston on July 11.) The provincially operated ferries, as the first to operate without a toll on the route, entered service after 1936.

In 1984, Queen Elizabeth toured the Kingston area as part of its two hundredth anniversary, attending several events and ceremonies through her visit. On her final day in the region, she dedicated the Loyalist Parkway in honour of the settlers that landed there in 1784. The ceremony was held in Amherstview on September 27, 1984.

In 1998, all portions of Highway 33 west of Ontario Highway 62, Bloomfield or east of Collins Bay Road, Kingston were decertified as provincial highway and downloaded as county or city roads.

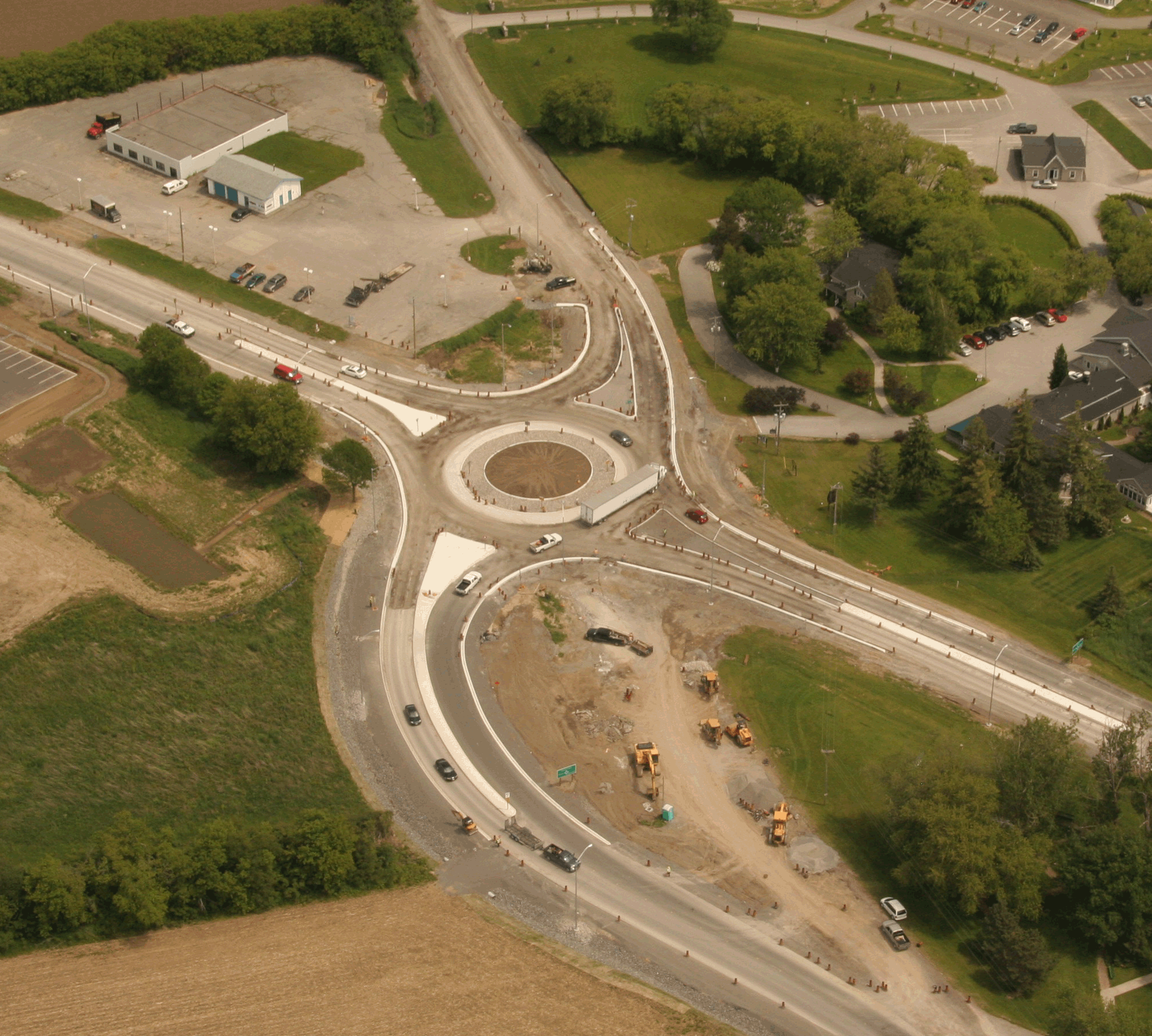
The Highway 33 and Prince Edward County Road 1 roundabout in mid-construction

In 2009, the intersection of Highway 33 and Prince Edward County Road 1 (Scoharie Road) near Picton saw the introduction of a traffic roundabout, the first ever constructed on a provincial highway in the province, to replace the at-grade intersection. The MTO felt that the area had reached its operational threshold due to high tourist and recreational activity, particularly during the busy summer months, and so felt a traffic roundabout was needed.

The engineering and consulting firm Morrison Hershfield was retained to undertake the detail design for the realignment and reconfiguration of the existing intersection at Highway 33 and Country Road 1 into a single lane roundabout with a central island and truck apron. The assignment included highway engineering, drainage and hydrology engineering, electrical engineering, public consultation, and traffic engineering. The roundabout was officially opened on July 17, 2009.

== Major intersections ==
The following table lists the major junctions along Highway 33, as noted by the Ministry of Transportation of Ontario.

| Division | Location | km | mi | Destinations | Notes |
|---|---|---|---|---|---|
| Hastings | Stirling-Rawdon | −69.9 | −43.4 | County Road 8 east (Mill Street); County Road 14 (Front Street / North Street) | Former Highway 33 northern terminus; formerly Highway 14; former Highway 33 follows County Road 8 west |
| Hastings | Stirling-Rawdon | −69.0 | −42.9 | County Road 8 west (Front Street) Hastings County Road 33 begins | Former Highway 33 follows County Road 33 south |
| Quinte West | | −68.2 | −42.4 | Hastings County Road 33 ends Quinte West Municipal Road 33 begins | Quinte West city limits |
| Quinte West | | −48.7 | −30.3 | Highway 401 – Kingston, Toronto | Highway 401 exit 525 |
| Quinte West | | −44.6 | −27.7 | Municipal Road 2 east (Dundas Street) – Belleview | Formerly Highway 2 east; former northern end of Highway 2 concurrency |
| Quinte West | | −44.2 | −27.5 | Municipal Road 2 west (Dundas Street) – Brighton | Formerly Highway 2 west; former southern end of Highway 2 concurrency |
| Prince Edward | Carrying Place | −37.2 | −23.1 | Municipal Road 64 west / Old Portage Road Quinte West Municipal Road 33 ends Prince Edward County Road 33 begins | Quinte West city limits; Quinte West Municipal Road 33 southern terminus; Prince Edward County Road 33 |
| Prince Edward | | −15.7 | −9.8 | County Road 20 west | Orientation changes from north-south to east-west |
| Prince Edward | Bloomfield | 0.0 | 0.0 | Highway 62 north – Belleville Highway 33 begins Prince Edward County Road 33 ends | Highway 33 western terminus; beginning of Bloomfield Connecting Link agreement |
| Prince Edward | Bloomfield | 0.4 | 0.25 | County Road 12 south (Stanley Street) | |
| Prince Edward | Bloomfield | 1.0 | 0.62 | County Road 30 north (Corey Street) | |
| Prince Edward | Bloomfield | 2.1 | 1.3 | | End of Bloomfield Connecting Link agreement |
| Prince Edward | | 2.7 | 1.7 | County Road 32 south | |
| Prince Edward | Warings Corner | 4.8 | 3.0 | County Road 1 (Scoharie Road / Sandy Hook Road) | Roundabout |
| Prince Edward | Picton | 6.8 | 4.2 | Mill Street | Beginning of Connecting Link agreement |
| Prince Edward | Picton | 7.5 | 4.7 | County Road 4 west (Talbot Street); County Road 10 south (Lake Street) | |
| Prince Edward | Picton | 8.6 | 5.3 | County Road 49 north (Main Street) | Formerly Highway 49 north |
| Prince Edward | Picton | 8.9 | 5.5 | County Road 8 east (Union Street) | |
| Prince Edward | Picton | 9.2 | 5.7 | County Road 22 south (Church Street) | |
| Prince Edward | Picton | 9.5 | 5.9 | | End of Connecting Link agreement |
| Prince Edward | Glenora | 16.5 | 10.3 | County Road 7 east | |
| Bay of Quinte | | 17.0 | 10.6 | Glenora Ferry | |
| Lennox and Addington | Greater Napanee | 21.8 | 13.5 | County Road 8 east | |
| Lennox and Addington | Greater Napanee | 36.6 | 22.7 | County Road 21 north | Adolphustown |
| Lennox and Addington | Loyalist | 43.6 | 27.1 | | Beginning of Bath Connecting Link agreement |
| Lennox and Addington | Loyalist | 44.4 | 27.6 | County Road 7 north (Church Street) | |
| Lennox and Addington | Loyalist | 46.4 | 28.8 | | End of Bath Connecting Link agreement |
| Lennox and Addington | Loyalist | 48.1 | 29.9 | County Road 4 north | Millhaven; formerly Highway 133 north |
| Lennox and Addington | Loyalist | 50.7 | 31.5 | County Road 26 north (Jim Snow Drive) | |
| Lennox and Addington | Loyalist | 55.0 | 34.2 | County Road 6 north – Odessa | Amherstview |
| Lennox and Addington–Kingston boundary | Loyalist–Kingston boundary | 58.4 | 36.3 | County Road 24 (Coronation Boulevard) Highway 33 ends Kingston Road 33 begins | Highway 33 eastern terminus |
| Kingston | | 60.9 | 37.8 | Collins Bay Road | Beginning of former Kingston Connecting Link agreement |
| Kingston | | 68.9 | 42.8 | Road 2 (Princess Street) | Formerly Highway 2; former Highway 33 eastern terminus |
1.000 mi = 1.609 km; 1.000 km = 0.621 mi: Closed/former; Route transition

== See also ==
- List of Ontario Tourist Routes
