= Sandbanks Provincial Park =

Provincial park in Ontario, Canada

- IUCN category II (national park)
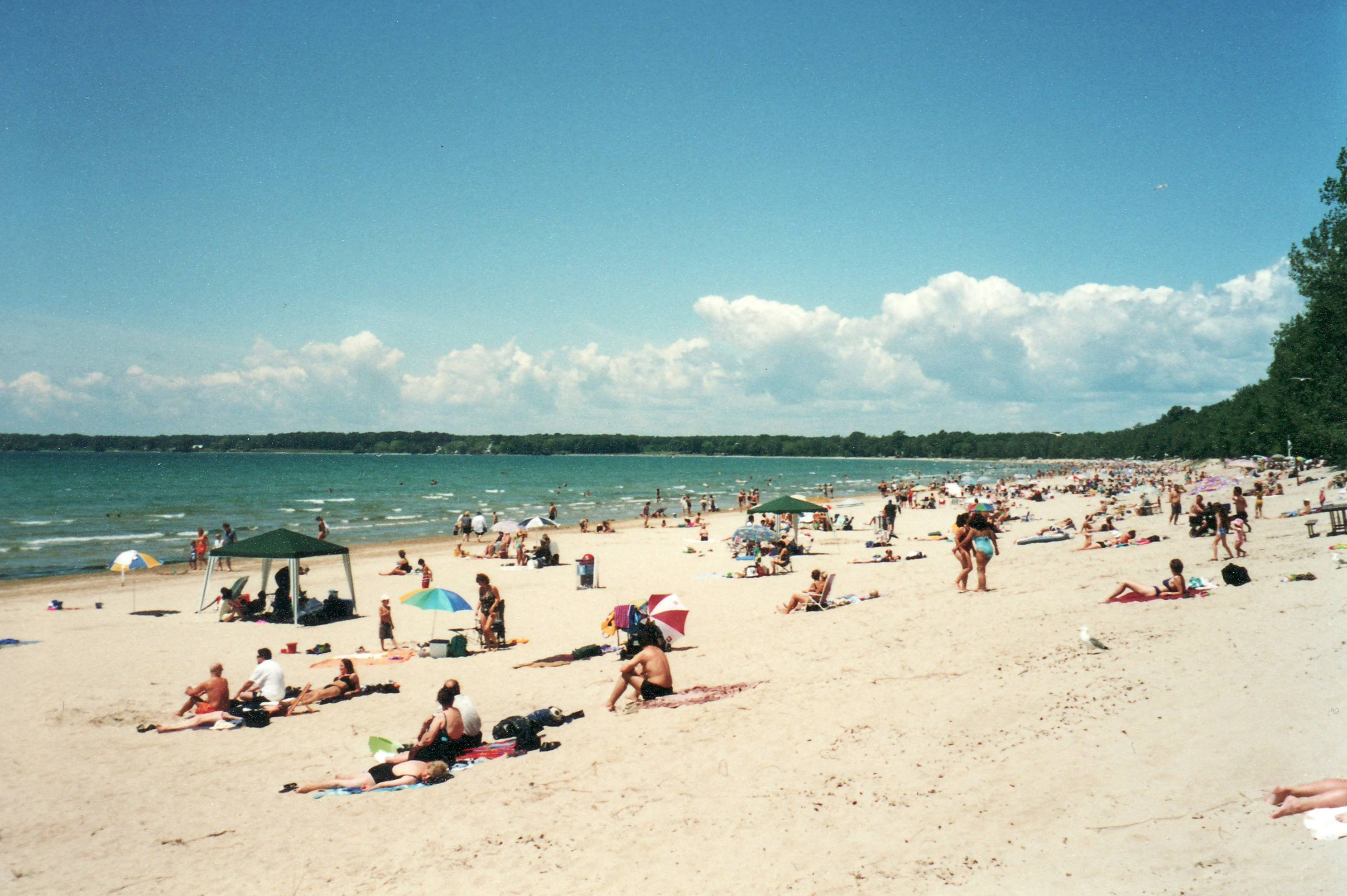
- Beach located along Lake Ontario

- Location within Southern Ontario
- Interactive map of Sandbanks Provincial Park
- Location: Prince Edward County, Ontario, Canada
- Nearest city: Belleville, Ontario
- Coordinates: 43°54′N 77°16′W
- Area: 1,550.87 ha (5.9879 sq mi)
- Established: 1970
- Visitors: 703,205 (in 2022)
- Governing body: Ontario Parks
- Website: www.ontarioparks.ca/park/sandbanks

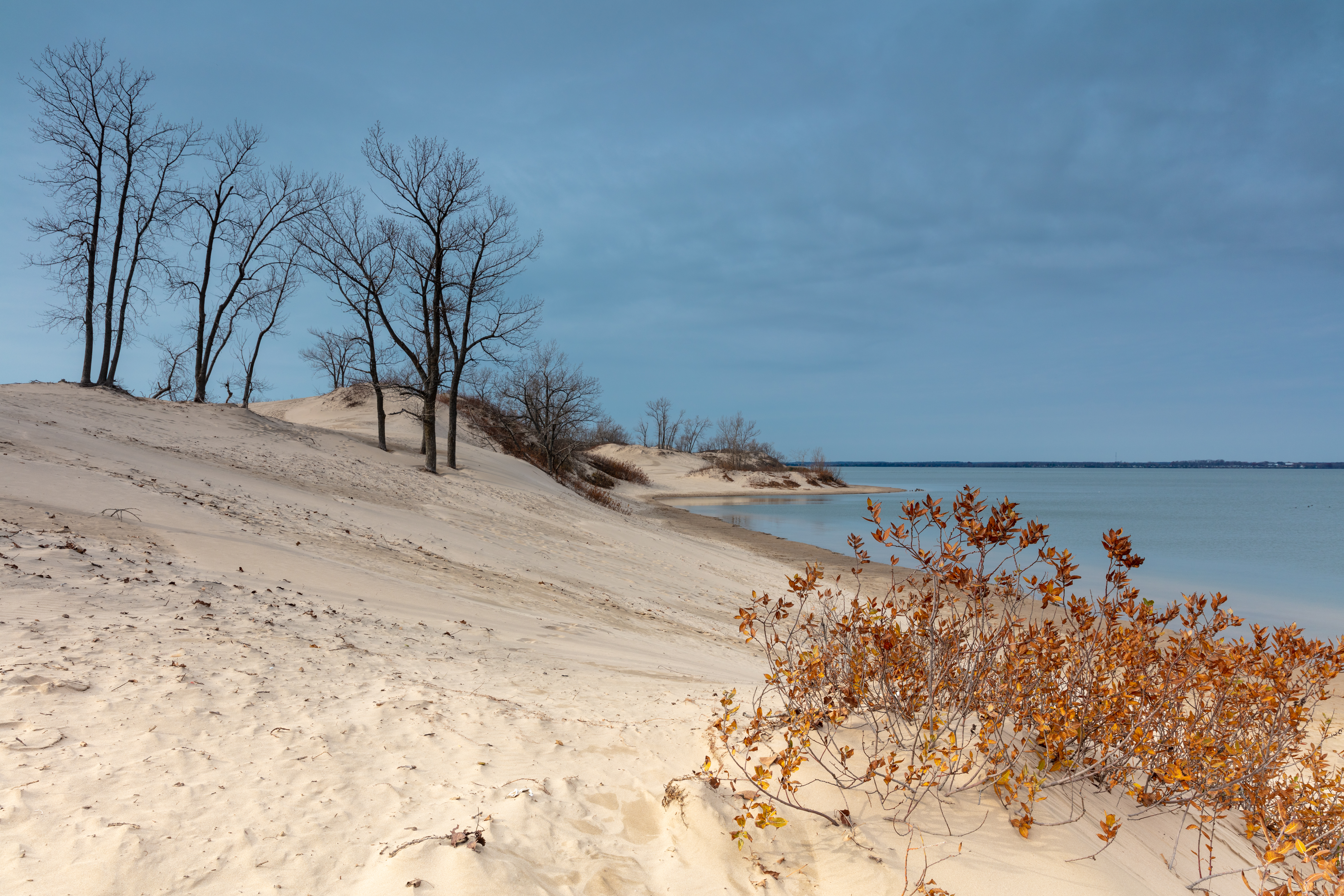
View of the Sandbanks in the Fall showing the dunes and foliage before the snow fall.

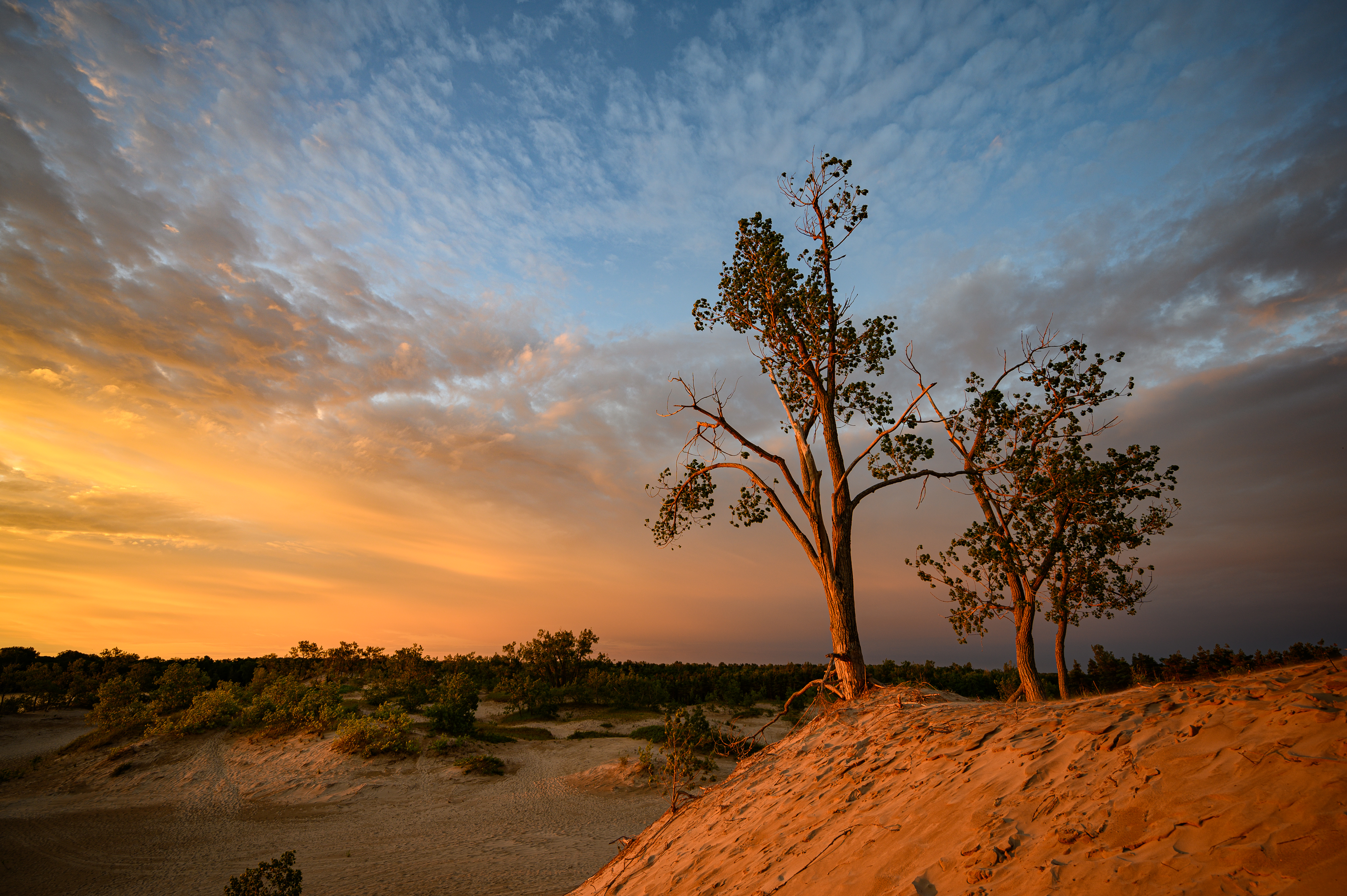
Dune system early morning

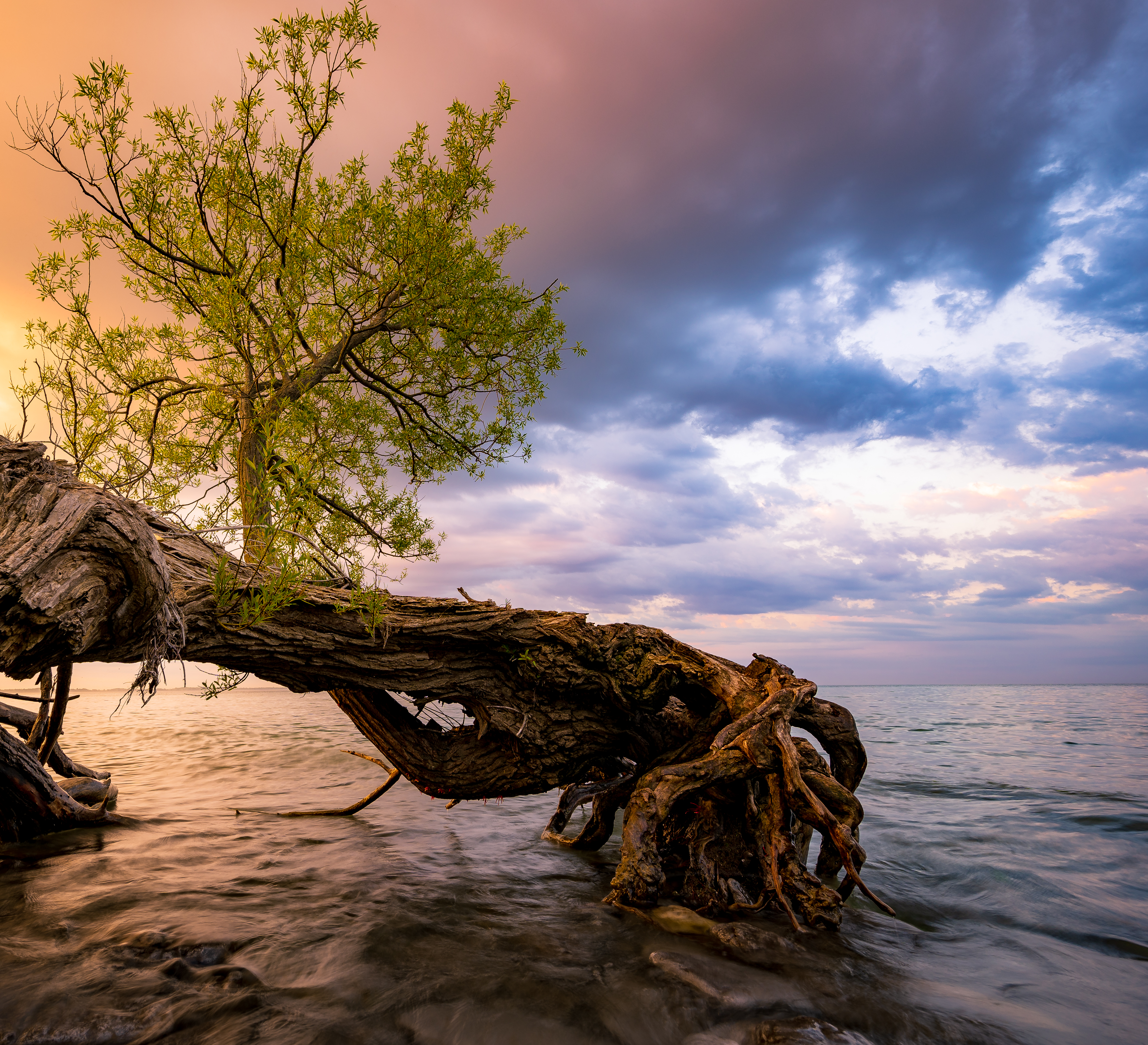
New growth on willow, in the Sandbanks dune system

Sandbanks Provincial Park is a provincial park located on Lake Ontario in Prince Edward County near Picton, Ontario, Canada. The park is considered one of the best sandy beaches in Ontario and contains the largest bay-mouth barrier dune formation in the world. The 1,550.87-hectare (3,832.3-acre) park was established in 1970 and operates year-round. Birdwatching, camping, cycling, fishing, and swimming are among the activities available in the park.

== Description ==
Sandbanks Provincial Park is located on the northern shore of Lake Ontario in Prince Edward County 14 kilometres (8.7 mi) south of Picton, Ontario, Canada. The park measures 1,550.87 hectares (3,832.3 acres) in size. It is noted for its picturesque sand dunes and beaches and contains the largest bay-mouth barrier dune system in the world. This formation is created by longshore currents flowing from west to east along Lake Ontario's northern shore. Some dunes can reach 25 metres (82 ft) high. The dune system stretches roughly eight kilometres (5.0 mi) long from the tip in the northwest less than 100 metres (330 ft) wide to a 1.5 kilometres (0.93 mi) swath in the southeast. The dunes run from Lake Ontario into West Lake. Behind the barrier dunes lies a series of foredunes that is sparsely vegetated and further back, pannes, back dunes, and reforested sand ridges.

County Road 12 in Prince Edward County, stretching from The Outlet, Ontario to Bloomfield, Ontario, runs through the park.

=== Flora and fauna ===
Plants native to the sand dunes include sea rocket, American beachgrass, tall wormwood, Russian thistle, sand cherry. In the pannes, sedge and rushes are the most common, along with orchids, purple gerardia, Kalm's lobelia, silverweed and twayblades. In the forested areas, creeping juniper, white cedar, eastern hemlock, sugar maple, balsam fir, white spruce and three types of pine tree are common. Prairie species are also found within the park, such as hoary puccoon, sand dropseed, and butterflyweed.

Animals found within the park include a number of shorebird and amphibian species, along with largemouth and smallmouth bass, yellow pickerel, northern pike among other fish.

== History ==
The dunes were formed by glaciers 12,500 years ago. In the 1880s, due to a combination of timber cutting and poor farming practices, the soil inland from the sand dunes had become destabilized and the sand dunes were able to drift inland, increasing in size. In 1881, the West Point Road was buried under 30 metres (98 ft) of sand and the town of Athol, Ontario was forced to relocate after facing a similar event. In the 1920s, Sandbanks was the site of an intense reforestation project. The sand dunes extended over a further 34 hectares (85 acres). To recreate the Carolinian forest that had pre-existed there, the reforestation project used poplar to prevent the sand dunes from burying roads and orchards.

Development of Sandbanks Provincial Park began in the 1960s. A development plan submitted in February 1964 placed a paved road through the sand dunes. After protests due to the damage that would cause to the dunes, the plan was abandoned and Parks Ontario pledged to protect the dunes. The park was established in 1970.

== Recreational use ==
Sandbanks Provincial Park is one of the most popular parks in Ontario, commonly reaching capacity by 10 am. The park is operated by the government of Ontario, with areas for different types of recreation. With 3 beaches (Outlet Beach, Dunes Beach and Lakeshore Beach) and over 600 campsites. Sandbanks offers both non-electrical and electrical campsites located all over the park. Some parts of the beach had been bought or settled before the designation of the area as a provincial park, which makes the beaches come in short clusters along the coastline. Naturists have used the beaches for nude bathing for many years. Other activities include walking, cycling, birdwatching, fishing and swimming.

=== Park information ===
There are two radio stations for travelers at the main entrance to the park.

- 89.5 FM (English)
- 91.9 FM (French)

== In media ==
Sandbanks stands in for Sable Island in the 2002 made-for-television film Touching Wild Horses, starring Jane Seymour. Resident Evil: Afterlife (2010) was also filmed there. This is also where the music video for the 1985 song "Wave Babies" by Honeymoon Suite was filmed. Sandbanks was filmed for Leg 7 pit stop for season 8 of The Amazing Race Canada.
