= List of numbered roads in Lennox and Addington County =

List of county roads

This is a list of numbered county roads in Lennox and Addington County, Ontario.

County Road #	Local name(s)	Western/Northern Terminus	Eastern/Southern Terminus	Settlements served	Additional Notes
Lennox and Addington County Road 1; Lennox and Addington County Road 1E	County Road 1 West Bridge Street West, Belleville Road (Napanee); County Road 1 East Bridge Street East, Camden Road, Newburgh Road (Napanee)	1W: Deseronto Road County Road 10 County Road 24 (Hastings County limits) 1E: County Road 1W Napanee	1W: County Road 1E Napanee 1E: Township Road 4 Camden-Portland Boundary Road (Frontenac County limits)	Napanee, Newburgh, Camden Eas, Yarker	West portion formerly provincial highway 502
Lennox and Addington County Road 2	County Road 2 Dundas Street East and Dundas Street Wes (Napanee), Main Street Odessa,	Deseronto Road (Hastings County limits)	Road 2 Princess Street (Frontenac/Kingston City Limits)	Napanee, Odessa	Formerly Highway 2 (main east-west provincial highway), decertified 1998. Continues west as Dundas Street, Deseronto, and east as Princess Street, Kingston
Lennox and Addington County Road 3	County Road 3	Cold Water Road (Hastings County limits)	County Road 41	Marlbank, Erinsville	Continues as Napanee Road, Queen Street and Napanee Road in Hastings, and becomes County Road 13
Lennox and Addington County Road 4	County Road 4 County Road 4W	County Road 41	Highway 33	Millhaven, Camden East, Centreville, Tamworth	West of Tamworth the road becomes County Road 4W
Lennox and Addington County Road 5	Palace Road; County Road 5	County Road 2	County Road 4	Napanee	Palace Road name changes to County Road 5 at Highway 401
Lennox and Addington County Road 6	County Road 6	County Road 14	Highway 33	Amherstview, Odessa, Yarker, Colebrook, Moscow,	
Lennox and Addington County Road 7	County Road 7	County Road 2	Highway 33	Bath	
Lennox and Addington County Road 8	County Road 8	River Road/Palace/Centre Street South Intersection (Napanee)	Highway 33	Adolphustown, Napanee	
Lennox and Addington County Road 9	River Road; County Road 9	County Road 8/Palace/Centre Street South Intersection (Napanee)	County Road 8	Napanee, Greta, Bethany, Huff Wharf, Watercombe	
Lennox and Addington County Road 10	Deseronto Road	Kennelly Road (Hastings) / County Road 11	Dundas Street (Deseronto) County Road 2		This road is the boundary between Lennox and Hastings counties.
Lennox and Addington County Road 11	County Road 11	Deseronto Road (County Road 10) (Hastings County limits)	Main Street (County Road 27)	Selby, Newburgh	
Lennox and Addington County Road 12	County Road 12 Deseronto Road	Deseronto Road (Hastings County limits)	County Road 41	Forest Mills	A small section of Deseronto Road from County Road 12 to Enright is held under the jurisdiction of the County of Lennox and Addington as County Road 12
Lennox and Addington County Road 13	County Road 13	County Road 41	Youngs Road	Erinsville	
Lennox and Addington County Road 14	County Road 14	County Road 41	Deerhurst Lane	Reidville, Enterprise	
Lennox and Addington County Road 15	County Road 15 Concession Street North	Frontenac County limits	County Road 4	Gull Creek, Tamworth	continues north to Highway 7 as Arden Road in Frontenac County
Lennox and Addington County Road 16	County Road 16	County Road 11	County Road 1	none	minor connecting route
Lennox and Addington County Road 17	County Road 17	County Road 4	County Road 27	Newburgh	minor connecting route
Lennox and Addington County Road 18	County Road 18	County Road 1 West	County Road 5	none	minor connecting route
Lennox and Addington County Road 19	County Road 19 (Mud Lake Road North)	County Road 6	Howes Road	Odessa	
Lennox and Addington County Road 20	County Road 20	County Road 6	Florida Road	Wilton	
Lennox and Addington County Road 21	County Road 21	County Road 8	Highway 33	Galts Corner	minor connecting route
Lennox and Addington County Road 22	County Road 22	County Road 8	County Road 7	Millers Corners	
Lennox and Addington County Road 23	Taylor Kidd Boulevard	County Road 4	County Road 24	Amherstview, Millhaven	extension of Kingston suburban route as Taylor Kidd Boulevard, then becomes John Counter Boulevard in Kingston (proper)
Lennox and Addington County Road 24	Coronation Boulevard	Woodbine Road (Kingston)	Highway 33	Amherstview	western boundary of Kingston (Collins Bay), eastern boundary of Lennox County (Amherstview)
Lennox and Addington County Road 25	County Road 25	South Shore Road	County Road 8	The Pines	
Lennox and Addington County Road 26	Jim Snow Drive	Taylor Kidd Boulevard (County Road 23)	Highway 33	Millhaven	minor connecting route, serves a Bombardier factory near Millhaven
Lennox and Addington County Road 27	County Road 7	County Road 14	County Road 1	Croydon, Newburgh	
Lennox and Addington County Road 28	Millhaven Road	County Road 4	County Road 6	Links Mills, Asselstine, Odessa	
Lennox and Addington County Road 29	Flinton Road	Hastings County limits	Highway 41	Flinton, Flinton Corners	continues through Hastings County as Flinton Road to Highway 7
Lennox and Addington County Road 30	Buckshot Lake Road	Highway 41	Frontenac County limits	Vennachar, Vennachar Junction	veers into Hastings County briefly near Russ Brown Road; continues through Hastings County to Plevna
Lennox and Addington County Road 41	County Road 41; Centre Street North Centre Street South	County Road 8 in Napanee	Highway 41	Kaladar, Napanee	continues north as Highway 41 to Pembroke and south as Lennox and Addington County Road 8 to Adolphustown
