= Ontario Highway 502 =

Ontario provincial highway

Highway 502

Route information
- Maintained by the Ministry of Transportation of Ontario
- Length: 151.1 km (93.9 mi)
- History: 1956–1973 (near Napanee); 1980–present (Fort Frances–Dryden)

Major junctions
- South end: Highway 11 – Fort Frances
- North end: Highway 594 – Dryden

Location
- Country: Canada
- Province: Ontario

Highway system
- Ontario provincial highways; Current; Former; 400-series
← Queen Elizabeth Way	→ Highway 510
Former provincial highways
← Highway 501	Highway 503 →

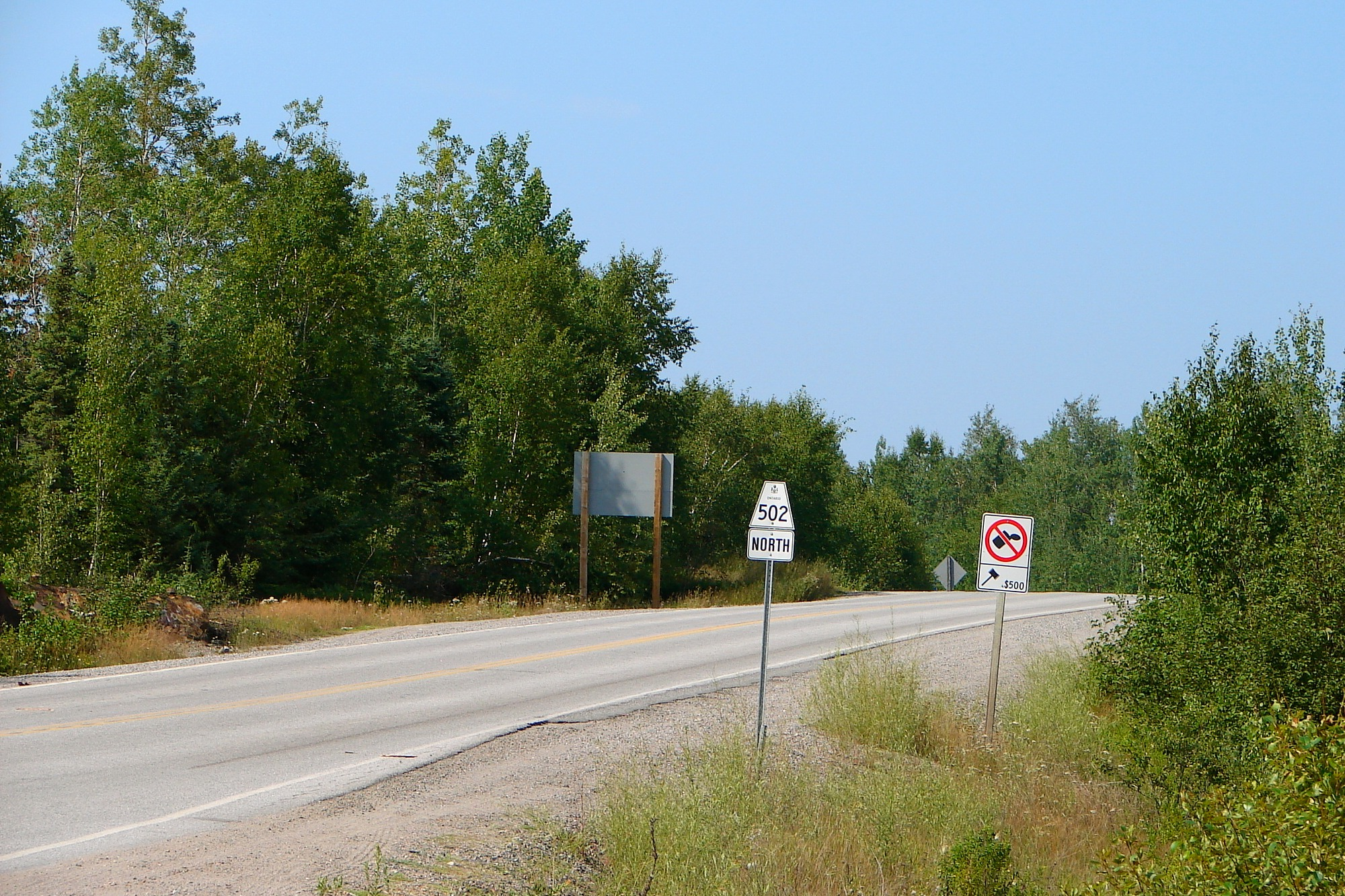
South end of Highway 502

Secondary Highway 502, commonly referred to as Highway 502, is a provincially maintained secondary highway in the Canadian province of Ontario. The highway is 151.7 kilometres (94.3 mi) long, connecting Highway 11 east of Fort Frances with Highway 17 in Dryden, via Highway 594. It also carries the Great River Road designation.

The route was constructed throughout the mid- to late 1970s as a new connection between Highway 11 and Highway 17, known as the Manitou Road. It opened in 1980. Another Highway 502 existed between 1956 and 1973, a short alternative route to Highway 2 near Napanee.

== Route description ==
Highway 502 begins at a junction with Highway 11 approximately 30 kilometres (19 mi) east of Fort Frances. It progresses north through an isolated region dominated by the forests, exposed bedrock, rivers, numerous lakes, muskeg and mountains of the Canadian Shield, encountering no communities or significant roads along its 151.1-kilometre (93.9 mi) route; it does provide access to numerous logging and mineral access roads. Highway 502 ends at a junction with Highway 594 approximately 6 kilometres (3.7 mi) west of Dryden and 8 kilometres (5.0 mi) west of Highway 17.

On an average day, approximately 520 vehicles use the highway at the southern terminus, while approximately 420 vehicles use the highway at the northern terminus. These represent the heaviest and lightest travelled portions of the route, respectively.

== History ==
Historically, the Ontario Highway 502 designation has been used on two different, unrelated roads: the Belleville Road between Marysville and Napanee, and the Fort Frances–Dryden Highway in northwestern Ontario.

=== Belleville Road ===
Prior to the completion of Highway 401 near Napanee, Highway 2 formed the backbone of the provincial highway network and served as the main corridor between Toronto, Kingston, Montreal, and other cities and towns along the north shore of Lake Ontario and the Saint Lawrence River. To the west of Napanee, Highway 2 turned south at Marysville to travel through Deseronto and along the shoreline of the Bay of Quinte and Napanee River, rather than the more direct route along Belleville Road. Highway 502 was designated alongside many other secondary highways on May 9, 1956. It was the southernmost secondary highway in the province. The new route reduced the distance between Marysville and Napanee by nearly 5 km (3 mi).

The section of Highway 401 parallel to Belleville Road was one of the final links in the trans-provincial freeway. By early 1963, the freeway had opened as a four lane route west of Wyman Road near Marysville, and as a two lane route (along the future eastbound lanes) east of Napanee. The future eastbound lanes between Wyman Road and Napanee opened in the fall of 1962; the westbound lanes were opened in the fall of 1964, completing Highway 401 between Toronto and Kingston.

The opening of Highway 401 resulted in a sharp reduction in traffic volume along Highway 2 and consequently Highway 502. Highway 502 was decommissioned and transferred to Hastings County and Lennox and Addington County in 1973. Today the former highways is known as Hastings County Road 24 and Lennox and Addington County Road 1.

=== Northern Ontario ===
In 1972, planning began for a new route between Highway 11 near Fort Frances and Highway 17 near Dryden. The existing Highway 812 extended north from Highway 11 for approximately 50 kilometres (30 mi), and so work began to extend it north the remaining 100 kilometres (62 mi). During construction, the route was referred to as the Manitou Road. The Manitou Road was officially opened on October 31, 1980, and redesignated as Highway 502. It has remained unchanged since then.

For several years in the late 1990s and early 2000s, the highway became used by trucking traffic as an alternative to Ontario Highway 71, after load restrictions were placed on the Sioux Narrows Bridge.

== Major intersections ==
The following table lists the major junctions along Highway 502, as noted by the Ministry of Transportation of Ontario.

Division	Location	km	mi	Destinations	Notes
Rainy River	Unorganized Rainy River	0.0	0.0	Highway 11 – Fort Frances, Rainy River	Trans-Canada Highway
Kenora	Unorganized Kenora	92.6	57.5	4th Base Line	
Kenora	Dryden	151.1	93.9	Highway 594 – Dryden, Eagle River	Access to Highway 17
1.000 mi = 1.609 km; 1.000 km = 0.621 mi
