= Warings Corner =

Community in Prince Edward County, Ontario

Coordinates: 43.993°N 77.178°W

Location of Warings Corner in Ontario

Warings Corner is a community in Prince Edward County, Ontario. It is situated at the intersection of Loyalist Parkway and Prince Edward County road 1.
