= Glenora, Ontario =

Glenora is a community in the Canadian province of Ontario, on the southern shore of the Bay of Quinte at 44°02′N 77°03′W. The Bay of Quinte is a long narrow inlet on the northern shore of Lake Ontario.

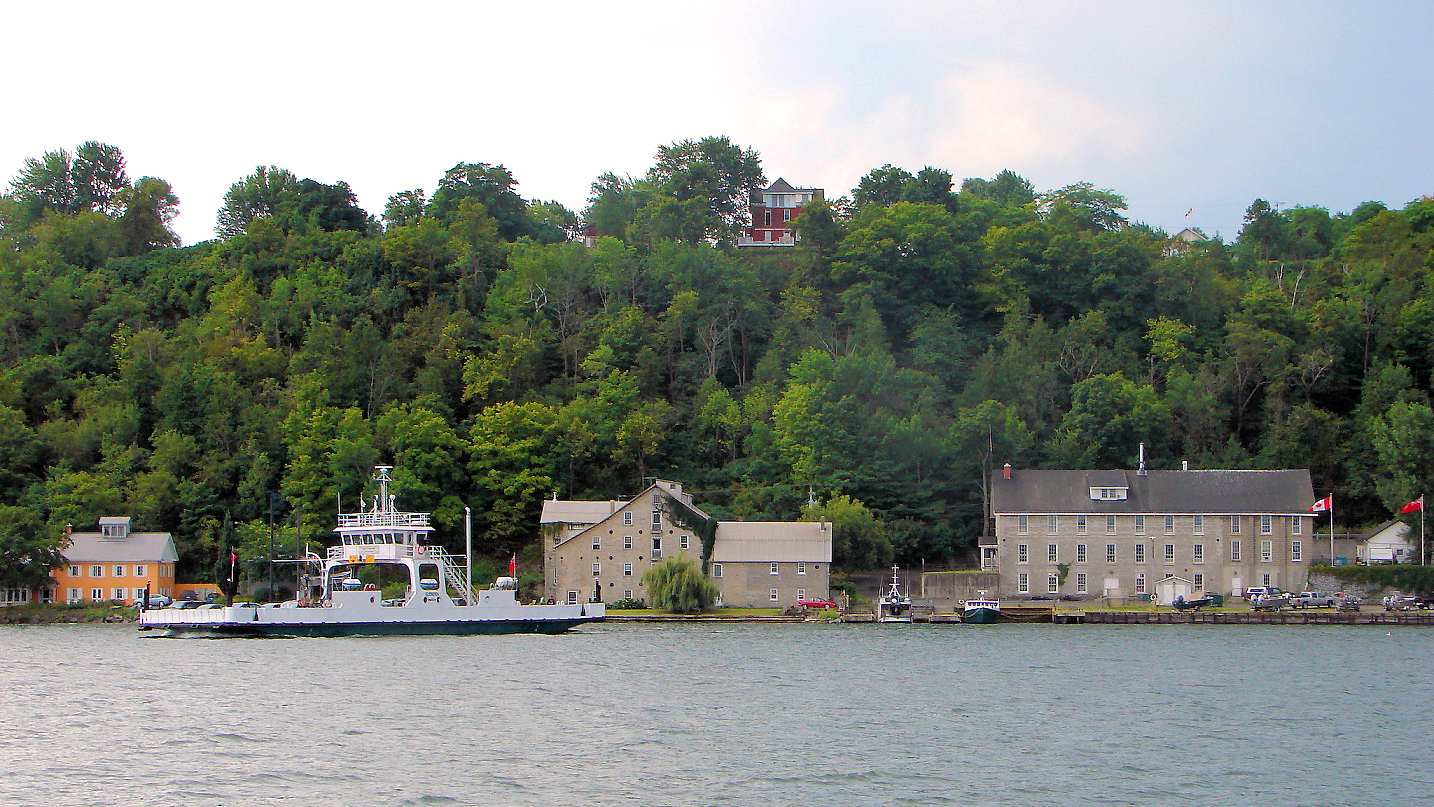
Glenora, Ontario and Glenora Ferry

Glenora is a rural area located directly east of Picton, Ontario in the municipality of Prince Edward County. It serves as the western terminus of the Glenora Ferry, which connects the two shores between Glenora and Adolphustown as part of the Loyalist Parkway (Ontario Highway 33).

The earliest ferry crossings at this point (originally named Stone Mills) were primarily local traffic from Adolphustown-Bath to the mills; these predate Asa Danforth Jr.'s 1802 extension of the pioneering Danforth Road (1801, Scarborough to the Trent River) to terminate at the Bay of Quinte. As colonial roads of the era were primitive, muddy and ill-maintained dirt pathways from which forest had been cleared and were often impassible, crossing at this point appears to have been sporadic until 1880, with the vessels originally powered by oarsmen and later by horses. Much traffic on the Bay of Quinte would remain local freight, such as milled grains and agricultural produce. Reliable scheduled stagecoach service only appeared after the 1817 York Road was constructed as the main post road from Toronto to Kingston via Napanee, bypassing the area.

The modern ferry crossing at this point is a free car ferry operated by the Ontario Ministry of Transportation, which runs at regular 30-minute intervals year-round (and more often at peak times in summer). The crossing (one-way) takes fifteen minutes.

Glenora is home to the Glenora Fisheries Station (Ontario Ministry of Natural Resources, Lake Ontario Management Unit), a research facility located on the Bay of Quinte near the ferry docks which maintains a Bay of Quinte Fisheries Management Plan and fishery management plans for Lake Ontario.

Glenora and Adolphustown both remain heavily reliant on agriculture and tourism; visitors are invited to pick strawberries (in-season in early July) as well as apples at various commercial orchards on both sides of the Bay of Quinte.

== See also ==
- List of communities in Ontario
