= Ontario Highway 62 =

Ontario provincial highway

Highway 62
- Madoc–Pembroke Road
- A map of Highway 62; Highway 62 Connecting Links; Former section

Route information
- Maintained by the Ministry of Transportation of Ontario
- Length: 165.8 km (103.0 mi)
- Existed: August 11, 1937–present

Major junctions
- South end: Highway 33 in Bloomfield
- Highway 401 in Belleville; Highway 7 in Madoc; Highway 28 in Bancroft
- North end: Highway 127 at Maynooth

Location
- Country: Canada
- Province: Ontario

Highway system
- Ontario provincial highways; Current; Former; 400-series
← Highway 61	→ Highway 63

King's Highway 62, commonly referred to as Highway 62, is a provincially maintained highway in the Canadian province of Ontario. The highway travels south–north from Highway 33 at Bloomfield in Prince Edward County, through Belleville, Madoc and Bancroft, to Maynooth, where it ends at a junction with Highway 127. Prior to 1997, the route continued north and east of Maynooth through Combermere, Barry's Bay, Killaloe, Round Lake and Bonnechere to Highway 17 in Pembroke. This section of highway was redesignated Hastings Highlands Municipal Road 62, Renfrew County Road 62, and Renfrew County Road 58.

Highway 62 was designated by the Department of Highways (DHO), predecessor to the modern Ministry of Transportation, in 1937 along the Madoc–Pembroke Road between those two communities. A gap existed along the route between Barry's Bay and Round Lake for several decades pending construction of a new road which never took place. The highway was extended south from Madoc to Highway 14 at Foxboro in 1966. Two years later, Highway 521 was renumbered as part of Highway 62, and a concurrency established with Highway 60 between Barry's Bay and Killaloe, uniting the discontinuous sections. In the 1980s, it assumed the route of Highway 14 from Foxboro to Bloomfield, establishing the peak length of the highway at 294.7 km (183.1 mi). The northernmost portion of the route was renumbered Highway 148 in 1982.

== Route description ==
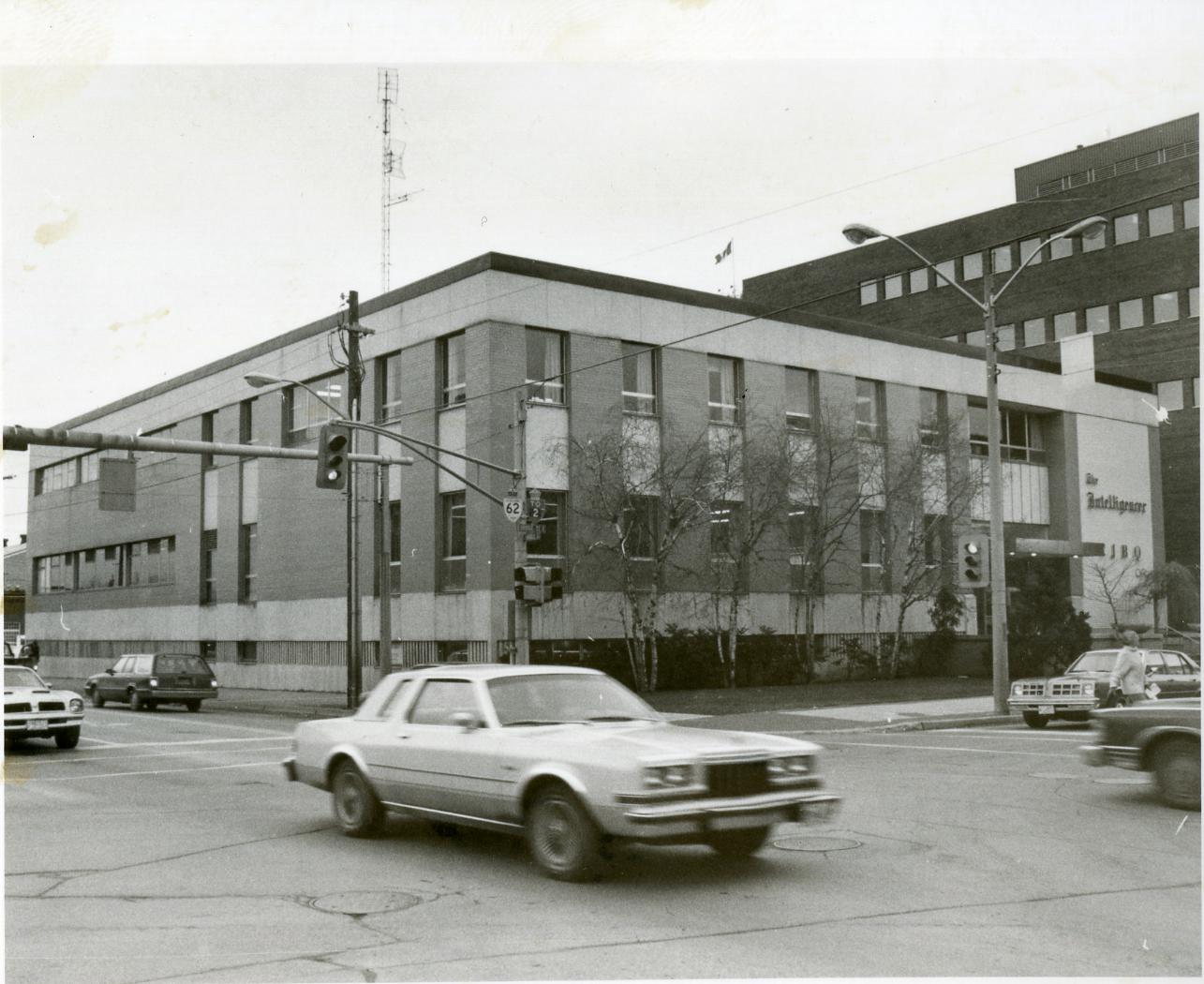
Highway 62 at Bridge Street in Belleville

Highway 62 begins in the community of Bloomfield at a junction with Highway 33, the Loyalist Parkway, with which it shares a common terminus at Wellington Street. The first 650 metres (2,130 ft) of the road north of that intersection is maintained under a Connecting Link agreement. Exiting Bloomfield, the highway winds north through several communities in Prince Edward County, including Huffs Corners where the Huff Estates Winery is located, Crofton, Mountain View and Fenwood Gardens before crossing the Norris Whitney Bridge over the Bay of Quinte into Belleville. It skirts the CFD Mountain View military base between Crofton and Mountain View.

Within urbanized Belleville, Highway 62 serves as the primary north–south route. It is maintained under a Connecting Link agreement from the northern end of the Norris Whitney Bridge to the southern end of the Highway 401 interchange. The Connecting Link follows Bay Bridge Road, Dundas Street, Pinnacle Street, and Front Street North. Prior to crossing the Moira River in downtown Belleville, Highway 62 encounters what was, until 1997, the southern terminus of Highway 37 at Station Street.

After crossing over Highway 401 at the Exit 543 cloverleaf interchange, Highway 62 exits the urban portion of Belleville. It travels straight north and passes beneath a hydro corridor until its path is interrupted by the Moira River approaching Foxboro; the highway bypasses to the west of that community along the boundary between Belleville and Quite West, meeting the southern terminus of former Highway 14 at Doucette Road. The former route through Foxboro is known as Ashley Street. Continuing along the bypass, the highway merges onto the Madoc Road at Halloway. Entering the municipality of Centre Hastings approximately 3 km (1.9 mi) north of Halloway, it follows the route of the historic settlement road north to Highway 7 at Madoc, passing through a mixture of farm fields and grasslands; the occasional forest interrupts the shorter vegetation, as well as the communities of West Huntingdon and Crookston.

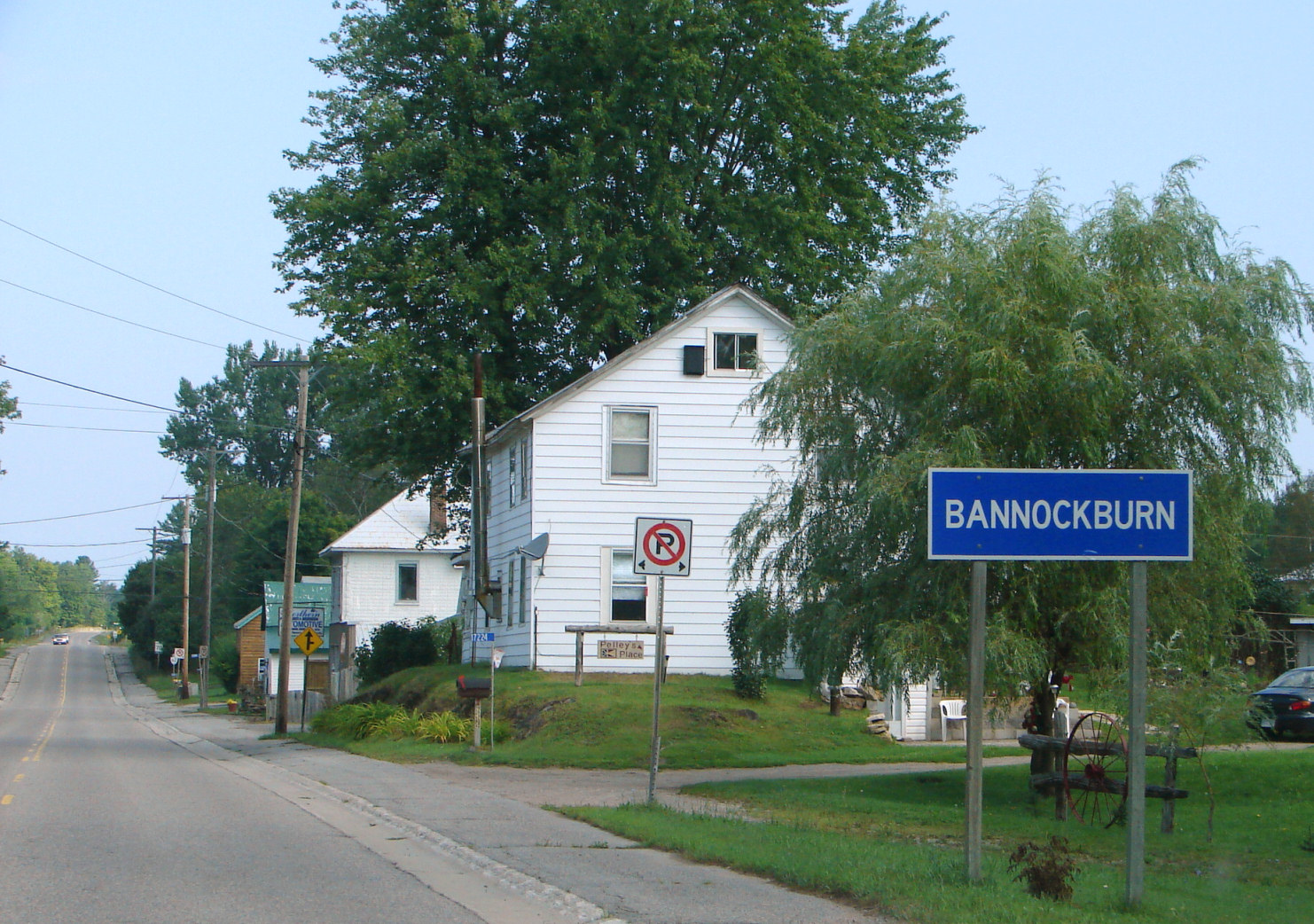
Highway 62 passing through Bannockburn

Within the village of Madoc, Highway 62 is maintained under a Connecting Link agreement as it passes through the centre of town. The Connecting Link begins just north of Charles Street and extends to south of Highway 7 (Trans-Canada Highway). Now following the Hastings Colonization Road, an early pioneer settlement road, the highway travels straight north into Madoc Township, passing through Eldorado, site of the first gold rush in Ontario. At Keller Bridge, the highway crosses under transmission lines and enters the Canadian Shield, with farmland giving way to thick forests and frequent rock outcroppings for the remainder of its length. The next 50 km (30 mi) of Highway 62 bypasses the Hastings Colonization Road through the particularly barren townships of Tudor and Cashel and Limerick, with a combined population of under 1,000. Only the communities of Bannockburn and Millbridge break the endless forests.

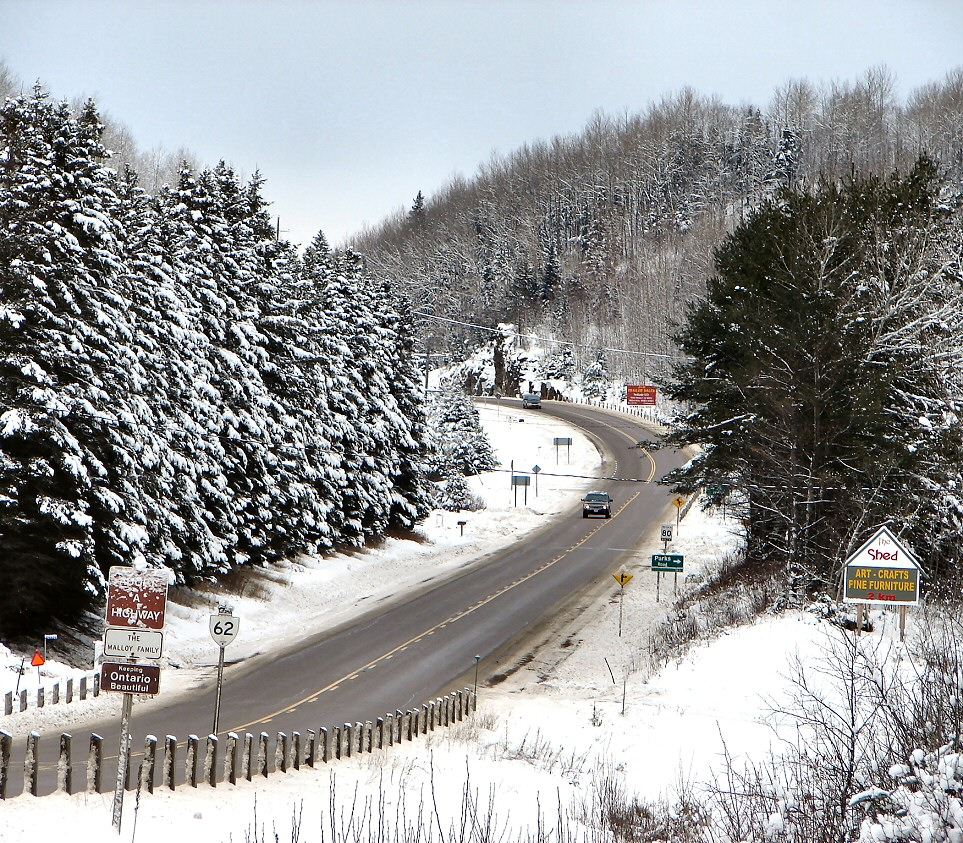
Highway 62 north of Bancroft

Entering the larger rural Town of Bancroft, Highway 62 travels through the community of L'Amable and around the lake of the same name. It enters the village of Bancroft, where it is maintained as a Connecting Link as it meanders alongside the York River. The Connecting Link begins south of Bay Lake Road and stretches 7.7 km (4.8 mi) through the village to Victoria Drive. Within the centre of the village, Highway 62 intersects and is briefly concurrent with Highway 28 along Bridge Street, crossing the York River. South of this concurrency, it is known as Mill Street, while north of the concurrency it is known as Hastings Street.

Parting ways with the York River, Highway 62 enters Hastings Highlands and passes through the communities of York River and Birds Creek, which form a continuous stretch of urban development along with the village of Bancroft. The highway then returns to thick forests, although the occasional farm dots the journey north, mostly surrounding the Hickey Settlement. At the Peterson Colonization Road, the highway makes a sharp curve east and enters Maynooth, before ending at the junction with Highway 127, with which it shares a terminus. Prior to 1997, Highway 62 continued east and north along what is now known as Hastings Highlands Municipal Road 62, Renfrew County Road 62 and Renfrew County Road 58 via Cobermere, Barry's Bay, Killaloe, Round Lake Centre, and Bonnechere to the Trans-Canada Highway (Highway 17) in Pembroke.

== History ==
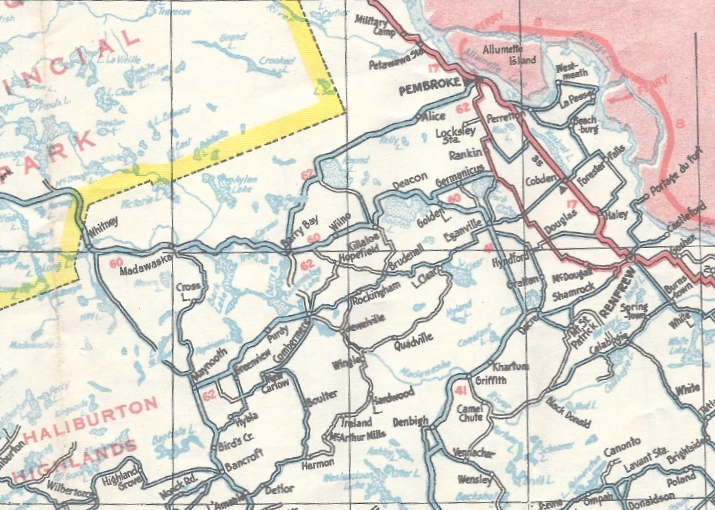
1937–38 Ontario road map, showing the section of Highway 62 between Barry's Bay and Bonnechere that was never built

Highway 62 was first assumed by the DHO in 1937. On April 1 of that year, the DHO merged with the Department of Northern Development. Following the merger, many new trunk roads through central and northern Ontario were designated as provincial highways. One of these was the Madoc–Pembroke Road, which became Highway 62 on August 11, 1937. Originally, the route followed the Hastings Colonization Road, which was quickly determined to be too rough to upgrade. A new alignment was constructed to the east between Millbridge and L'Amable in the late 1930s. This bypass was opened to traffic on March 22, 1939. Subsequently, the bypassed portion of the highway was decommissioned on April 11.

At the time of its assumption, Highway 62 was split into two segments. The first section travelled from Madoc to Barry's Bay, the second from Pembroke to the community of Bonnechere, on the northwestern shore of Round Lake. It was originally planned to unite these segments by building a new highway mostly following the route of Paugh Lake Road. (Note: Some maps mistakenly show the route as complete between Barry's Bay and Pembroke. The official Ontario road map for 1937–1938 lists a distance of 50.2 km (31.2 mi) between Barry's Bay and Alice, while the 1940–1941 map divides the highway into two parts.) This section was never built, and so the two sections of Highway 62 remained separated for a quarter century.

Several changes occurred in the Round Lake area through the 1950s and 1960s. In 1956, Highway 521 was designated by the DHO between Brudenell and the northern segment of Highway 62 at Bonnechere Provincial Park. Four years later, Highway 62 was extended concurrently along Highway 60 between Barry's Bay and Killaloe and north along Highway 521 to Tramore on the southeast side of Round Lake. The remainder of Highway 521, between Tramore and Bonnechere Provincial Park, was renumbered Highway 62 in 1967, reuniting the two sections of the route.

Animation of highway routes near Pembroke, from 1936 to now

Within Pembroke, Highway 62 initially ended at the intersection of Trafalgar Road and Pembroke Street West. The completion of the Des Allumettes Bridge southeast of Pembroke, in 1957, resulted in the extension of Highway 62 to the Quebec boundary in 1960, almost entirely a concurrency with Highway 17. In 1966, Highway 62 was extended south of Madoc to Highway 14 at Foxboro when several Hastings County roads were taken over by the DHO on April 1 of that year.

The Norris Whitney Bridge over the Bay of Quinte was opened in December 1982, replacing the original 1891 swing bridge. Portions of the original causeway can still be seen alongside the current structure. Shortly thereafter, by 1984, the section of Highway 14 south of Foxboro to Highway 33 at Bloomfield was renumbered as part of Highway 62. Discussions have been underway since 2017 to build a second bridge, widening the highway from two to four lanes.

As part of a series of budget cuts initiated by premier Mike Harris under his Common Sense Revolution platform in 1995, numerous highways deemed to no longer be of significance to the provincial network were decommissioned and responsibility for the routes transferred to a lower level of government, a process referred to as downloading. Portions of Highway 62 were consequently transferred to local jurisdictions in 1997 and 1998. On April 1, 1997, the section from the Laurentian Valley – Killaloe, Hagarty and Richards boundary east to Highway 17 was transferred to Renfrew County. Renfrew quickly redesignated it as County Road 58. On January 1, 1998, the section northeast of Highway 127 in Maynooth was transferred to Hastings and Renfrew counties. The concurrency with Highway 60 was discontinued as a result of this transfer. Hastings County subsequently transferred its portion of the road to the townships of Monteagle and Bangor, Wicklow and McClure on April 15, 1998.

== Major intersections ==
The following table lists the major junctions along Highway 62, as noted by the Ministry of Transportation of Ontario.

Division	Location	km	mi	Destinations	Notes
Prince Edward	Bloomfield	0.0	0.0	Highway 33 east / County Road 33 west (Loyalist Parkway) – Picton, Wellington	Highway 62 southern terminus
Prince Edward		5.3	3.3	County Road 1 (Scoharie Road)	
Prince Edward		8.4	5.2	County Road 4 east – Gilbert Mills	
Prince Edward		12.4	7.7	County Road 14 (Burr Road) – Demorestville	
Prince Edward	Rossmore	24.8	15.4	County Road 28	
Prince Edward	Rossmore	25.8	16.0	County Road 3 west	
Bay of Quinte		25.9– 26.9	16.1– 16.7	Norris Whitney Bridge	
Belleville		26.9	16.7		Beginning of Belleville Connecting Link agreement
Belleville		27.5	17.1	Dundas Street	Formerly Highway 2 west; former southern end of Highway 2 concurrency
Belleville		28.5	17.7	Pinnacle Street / Dundas Street	Formerly Highway 2 east; former northern end of Highway 2 concurrency; Highway 62 follows Pinnacle Street
Belleville		29.5	18.3	Station Street / Front Street	Formerly Highway 37 north
Belleville		32.2	20.0	Highway 401 – Toronto, Kingston	Highway 401 exit 453; end of Belleville Connecting Link agreement
Belleville		36.7	22.8	Ashley Street	Original route of Highway 14
Belleville–Quinte West boundary		38.8	24.1	Municipal Road 5 (Frankford Road) – Frankford, Foxboro	
Belleville–Quinte West boundary		40.1	24.9	Municipal Road 14 (Foxboro–Stirling Road) – Stirling, Foxboro	Formerly Highway 14
Hastings	Centre Hastings	50.9	31.6	County Road 8 (Stirling Road / Moira Road) – Moira	West Huntingdon Station
Hastings	Centre Hastings	61.3	38.1	County Road 38 (Crookston Road) – Campbellford, Tweed	Crookston
Hastings	Centre Hastings (Madoc)	68.5	42.6	Shoreline Road	Beginning of Madoc Connecting Link agreement
Hastings	Centre Hastings (Madoc)	70.2– 70.3	43.6– 43.7	County Road 23 (St. Lawrence Street)	Highway 62 follows St. Lawrence Street for 1 block
Hastings	Centre Hastings (Madoc)	71.2	44.2	Highway 7 / TCH – Peterborough, Perth	End of Madoc Connecting Link agreement
Hastings	Madoc (township)	82.2	51.1	County Road 11 west (Deloro Road)	
Hastings	Madoc (township)	87.2	54.2	Bannockburn Road – Cooper	Bannockburn
Hastings	Tudor and Cashel	91.1	56.6	Old Hastings Road – Millbridge	Original route of Highway 62; Hastings Colonization Road
Hastings	Limerick	119.3	74.1	County Road 620 west (Coe Hill Road) – Ormsby	Formerly Highway 620 west
Hastings	Bancroft	139.6	86.7		Beginning of Bancroft Connecting Link agreement
Hastings	Bancroft	142.5	88.5	Highway 28 west (Sherbourne Street) – Lakefield	Southern end of Highway 28 concurrency
Hastings	Bancroft	142.7	88.7	Highway 28 east (Bridge Street) – Denbigh	Northern end of Highway 28 concurrency
Hastings	Bancroft	147.4	91.6		End of Bancroft Connecting Link agreement
Hastings	Hastings Highlands	165.8	103.0	Highway 127 north – Whitney Highway 62 ends Hastings County Road 62 begins	Maynooth; Highway 62 northern terminus
Hastings–Renfrew boundary	Hastings Highlands–Madawaska Valley boundary	195.0	121.2	Hastings County Road 62 ends Renfrew County Road 62 begins	
Renfrew	Madawaska Valley	197.5	122.7	County Road 517 south (Dafoe Road)	Formerly Highway 517 south
Renfrew	Madawaska Valley	198.2	123.2	County Road 515 south (Palmer Road)	Combermere; formerly Highway 515 south
Renfrew	Madawaska Valley	215.0	133.6	Highway 60 west – Huntsville; Renfrew County Road 62 ends	Barry's Bay; former southern end of Highway 60 concurrency
Renfrew	Killaloe, Hagarty and Richards	238.1	147.9	Highway 60 east – Eganville Renfrew County Road 58 begins County Road 512 south (Queen Street)	Killaloe; former northern end of Highway 60 concurrency; formerly Highway 512 south
Renfrew	Laurentian Valley	284.7	176.9	Highway 17 / TCH – North Bay, Ottawa	Former Highway 62 northern terminus (1982-1997); former Highway 148 western terminus (1982-1997)
Pembroke		289.9	180.1	County Road 19 (Boundary Road) Renfrew County Road 58 ends	Pembroke city limits
Pembroke		290.7	180.6	Pembroke Street	Formerly Highway 17 (pre-1982); former Highway 62 northern terminus (1937-1960); former southern end of Highway 17 concurrency (1960-1982); to County Road 42 west
Pembroke		292.2	181.6	Highway 41 south (Mackay Street) Highway 148 begins	Present-day Highway 148 western terminus; former Highway 62 follows present-day Highway 148
Renfrew	Laurentian Valley	297.4	184.8	County Road 40 east (Greenwood Road)	Former southern end of Highway 17 concurrency (1960-1982)
Ottawa River		299.2	185.9	Allumettes Bridge	
Ottawa River		299.2	185.9	R-148 east – Gatineau	Continuation into Quebec; former Highway 62 northern terminus (1960-1982); formerly Quebec Route 8 (pre-1972)
1.000 mi = 1.609 km; 1.000 km = 0.621 mi: Closed/former; Concurrency terminus; Route transition
