= Asa Danforth Jr. =

- Born: June 29, 1768; Brookfield, Massachusetts, United States
- Died: c. 1818 or 1821; United States
- Occupation(s): Early settler, land speculator, highway engineer
- Spouse: Olivia Langdon
- Children: Amanda Danforth
- Parent(s): Asa Danforth Sr. and Hannah Wheeler

Asa Danforth Jr. (June 29, 1768 – c. 1818 to 1821) was one of the first citizens of Onondaga County, New York, United States, when he arrived there with his father, Asa Danforth in 1788. Danforth incurred heavy debts speculating in land in New York State. Hoping to reverse his fortunes, he invested in the especially risky land titles of nearby Upper Canada and later was a highway engineer.

In Toronto, Ontario, Canada, Danforth Road, Danforth Village and Danforth Avenue (built by the Danforth Plank Road Company), which is a major east-end thoroughfare in Toronto, are named for him.

== Biography ==
=== Later years ===
Danforth's Road was extended in 1802 from Trenton to reach the Bay of Quinte at Stone Mills (now Glenora). From there, a primitive ferry crossing to Adolphustown provided access to an early Loyalist colonisation road, the Bath Road, built in 1784 from Bath to Kingston.

In 1817, the York Road (Kingston Road) bypassed through traffic between Trenton and Kingston away from Danforth's 1802 Bay of Quinte extension onto an inland route through Belleville and Napanee, eliminating a ferry crossing.

He left Upper Canada in 1802, was in hiding in New York City and died in or after 1821.

== Recognition and memorials ==
Danforth Avenue, a major east-end thoroughfare in Toronto, in turn lends its name to the main east-west TTC Bloor-Danforth subway line (1966). Colonel Danforth Trail is a short residential road beginning south of Highway 2A at Lawson Road to a cul de sac near Meadowvale Road and Lawrence Avenue East.

A Glenora Road which closely follows Danforth's 1802 path to Trenton was designated part of the Loyalist Parkway (1984). Asa Danforth Sr. didn't raise any Loyalists, but the road connects by ferry to an established 1784 Loyalist colonisation road through Bath to Kingston.

== See also ==
- The Danforth

== Notes ==
- Gates, Lillian F. (1987). "Danforth, Asa". In Halpenny, Francess G (ed.). Dictionary of Canadian Biography. Vol. VI (1821–1835) (online ed.). University of Toronto Press.
- The Dan
- Asa Danforth
- photo of marker locating the c. 1788 house occupied by Danforth
