= Ontario Highway 49 =

Ontario provincial highway

Highway 49
- A map of Highway 49; Highway 49 Downloaded segments Bypassed pre-1965 route

Route information
- Maintained by the Ministry of Transportation of Ontario
- Length: 5.8 km (3.6 mi)
- History: 1936–1961 (York County); February 1965–present (Picton–Marysville)

Major junctions
- South end: Quinte Skyway to Prince Edward County
- North end: Tyendinaga Mohawk Territory north limits

Location
- Country: Canada
- Province: Ontario

Highway system
- Ontario provincial highways; Current; Former; 400-series
| ← Highway 48 | → Highway 58 |
Former provincial highways
| Highway 50 → |

King's Highway 49, commonly referred to as Highway 49, is a provincially maintained highway in the Canadian province of Ontario. The 5.8-kilometre (3.6 mi) highway travels across the Quinte Skyway and through the Tyendinaga Mohawk Territory south of Marysville.

A previous iteration of Highway 49 existed between 1936 and 1961 from Kleinburg west to the York County boundary south of Bolton, which is today known as York Regional Road 49 (Nashville Road). The current Highway 49 was created in 1965 as an internal designation for the proposed route connecting the newly-opened Highway 401 with the skyway over the Bay of Quinte. By 1966, the route was signed south to Picton along what was Highway 41. The skyway opened in 1967, replacing a ferry crossing and completing Highway 49.

The route remained unchanged until the late 1990s, when more than half of the highway was transferred to the jurisdiction of local governments. The Quinte Skyway, as well as the portion through the Mohawk territory were retained in the provincial highway system, resulting in Highway 49 not connecting with any other provincial highway.

== Route description ==
Highway 49 within the Tyendinaga Territory

Highway 49 is a short highway that connects the county maintained roads that once formed a part of it. The province transferred the majority of the route to Prince Edward County and Hastings County in 1998. However, the Quinte Skyway (constructed in 1967) and the section lying within the Tyendinaga Mohawk Territory remain under provincial jurisdiction. At the southern end of the skyway, the route connects with Prince Edward County Road 49, which continues south to Picton, as well as County Road 15 and County Road 35. At the northern end of the skyway, the highway intersects the former Highway 2, which travels east to the town of Deseronto. From there it travels north to the northern edge of the Tyendinaga Mohawk Territory, after which it becomes Tyendinaga Township Road 2 for approximately 2.1 kilometres (1.3 mi) to the Highway 401 interchange.

== History ==
Two roads have borne the designation of Highway 49 within Ontario. The first existed between 1936 and 1972 in York County. The second was designated in 1965, and exists to this day.

=== 1936–1961 ===
Prior to the present Highway 49 being assumed by the Department of Highways (DHO), predecessor to the modern Ministry of Transportation (MTO), a previous route in York County, now the Regional Municipality of York, was designated as Highway 49. The original Highway 49 travelled along present-day York Regional Road 49 (Nashville Road) between Highway 50 and Kleinburg. It was assumed by the DHO on August 5, 1936, at a distance of 5.6 km (3.5 mi); it was already paved. The route remained as-is for 25 years before being transferred back to York County at some point in 1961.

=== 1965–present ===
The current iteration of Highway 49 was created in February 1965, when the southern, discontinuous section of Highway 41 north of Picton was renumbered. Prior to this, Highway 41 had two separate sections: one which ran north from Highway 2 at Napanee, and another that travelled north from Picton alongside the Bay of Quinte. The latter portion followed the present-day Prince Edward County Road 49 as far as Roblin Mills, where it curved to follow County Road 35. This road was known as the Lower High Shore Road; there was no road directly north from Roblin Mills until the 1960s. Highway 41 passed through Mount Carmel before ending at Cole's Wharf, where a ferry crossed to Huff's Wharf. The length of this section was 17.6 km (10.9 mi).

Highway 49 descending the Quinte Skyway

In preparation for the construction of the Quinte Skyway, the DHO took over 1.3 km (0.81 mi) of Marysville Road from the intersection of Highway 2 and Highway 502 (Belleville Road) to the soon-to-be completed Highway 401 interchange on June 26, 1963. Construction of the Quinte Skyway began with the awarding of a contract in November 1964. The DHO had planned to begin work in September 1962, but funding was unavailable. Severe winter weather prevented work from proceeding until the spring of 1965. Construction proceeded simultaneously on realigning the highway south to Picton, bypassing several portions and building a new road north from Roblin Mills in the process. An inland bypass was built around the Essroc cement plant, which opened in 1958. Old sections of the highway are now known as White Chapel Road and Lower High Shore Road. The Quinte Skyway and realigned Highway 49 were both completed in September 1967, with premier John Robarts opening the bridge during a motorcade on September 6.

Highway 49 remained unchanged for 30 years, until the late 1990s. As part of a series of budget cuts initiated by premier Mike Harris under his Common Sense Revolution platform in 1995, numerous highways deemed to no longer be of significance to the provincial network were decommissioned and responsibility for the routes transferred to a lower level of government, a process referred to as downloading. On January 1, 1998, the entire route of Highway 49 was downloaded to Hastings County and Prince Edward County. Hastings County, which does not maintain roads or bridges, in turn transferred its section to Tyendinaga Township and the Tyendinaga Mohawk Territory. The territory was unable to afford maintenance of the highly-travelled route, forcing the MTO to retain ownership of the highway within the territory.

== Major intersections ==
The following table lists the major junctions along Highway 49, as noted by the Ministry of Transportation of Ontario.

| Division | Location | km | mi | Destinations | Notes |
|---|---|---|---|---|---|
| Picton | | −20.2 | −12.6 | Highway 33 (Loyalist Parkway) | Decommissioned January 1, 1998; now Prince Edward County Road 49 |
| Prince Edward County | | 0.0 | 0.0 | County Road 15 | Southern end of Quinte Skyway |
| Hastings | Tyendinaga Mohawk Territory | 1.0 | 0.62 | County Road 16 – Deseronto | Northern end of Quinte Skyway; southern end of Tyendinaga Mohawk Territory |
| Hastings | Tyendinaga Mohawk Territory | 2.4 | 1.5 | Dundas Street – Deseronto; York Street | Southern end of former Highway 2 concurrency |
| Hastings | Tyendinaga Mohawk Territory | 5.8 | 3.6 | Tyendinaga Township Road L31 | Northern end of Tyendinaga Mohawk Territory; end of Highway 49 |
| Hastings | Tyendinaga | 6.9 | 4.3 | Old Highway 2 (west); Belleville Road (east) | Northern end of former Highway 2 concurrency; section decommissioned January 1, 1998; now Hastings County Road 15. Community of Marysville. Belleville Road is former Highway 502. |
| Hastings | Tyendinaga | 7.9 | 4.9 | Highway 401 – Toronto, Kingston | Section decommissioned January 1, 1998; now Hastings County Road 15 |
1.000 mi = 1.609 km; 1.000 km = 0.621 mi: Closed/former
