= List of numbered roads in Prince Edward County =

This is a list of numbered county roads in Prince Edward County, Ontario.

County Road #	Local name(s)	Western/Northern Terminus	Eastern/Southern Terminus	Townships served	Settlements served	Additional Notes
1	Schoharie Road, Sandy Hook Road	Loyalist Parkway	County Road 10	Hillier, Hallowell	Huff's Corners, Warings Corner	Known as Scoharie Road West of Warings Corner; Sandy Hook Road between Warings Corner and County Road 10
2	Belleville Street	King's Highway 62	Loyalist Parkway	Hillier, Ameliasburgh	Mountain View, Allisonville, Wellington	
3	Rednersville Road	Loyalist Parkway	King's Highway 62	Ameliasburgh	Carrying Place, Albury, Rednersville, Rossmore	
4	Ben Gill Road, Old Belleville Road, Talbot Street	King's Highway 62	Loyalist Parkway	Sophiasburgh, Hallowell	Gilbert Mills, Picton	Known as Ben Gill Road between Highway 62 and County Road 34; Talbot Street between 34 and Loyalist Parkway
5	Yerexville Road, Johnson Street	County Road 15	County Road 49	Sophiasburgh, Hallowell	Demorestville, Yerexville, Picton	
6	County Road 6	County Road 5	County Road 49	Hallowell	none	Minor connecting route
7	County Road 7	Loyalist Parkway	County Road 8	Hallowell, North Marysburgh	Glenora, Lake on the Mountain, Bongard, Cressy	
8	Union Street	Loyalist Parkway	County Road 7	Hallowell, North Marysburgh	Picton, Waupoos, Cressy	
10	County Road 10	County Road 24	County Road 13	Athol, South Marysburgh	Cherry Valley, Milford	
11	County Road 11	County Road 18	County Road 10	Athol	Athol, Woodrous	
12	Stanley Street	Loyalist Parkway	County Road 18	Hallowell, Athol	West Lake, Sandbanks Provincial Park	
13	Long Point Road	County Road 8	Gravelly Bay Road	North Marysburgh, South Marysburgh	Black River, Port Milford, South Bay	
14	Burr Road	County Road 2	County Road 15	Hillier, Sophiasburgh	Burr, Mountain View, Demorestville	
15	Northport Road	County Road 14	County Road 49	Sophiasburgh	Demorestville, Northport, Solmesville	
16	County Road 16	County Road 17	County Road 13	South Marysburgh	Black River	Minor connecting route
17	County Road 17	County Road 8	County Road 10	Hallowell, North Marysburgh, South Marysburgh	Milford	
18	County Road 18	County Road 12	County Road 10	Athol	West Lake, Sandbanks Provincial Park, The Outlet, Salmon Point, Cherry Valley	
19	County Road 19	Loyalist Parkway	County Road 2	Ameliasburgh	Ameliasburg, Mountain View	
20	Huycks Point Road	Huycks Point	Loyalist Parkway	Hillier	Huycks Bay	
21	County Road 21	Big Island Road	County Road 15	Sophiasburgh	none	Road approx. 900 m (0.56 mi) long consisting mostly of a bridge to Big Island
22	Church Street	County Road 8	County Road 10	Hallowell	Picton	Church Street continues north to Loyalist Parkway
23	County Road 23	County Road 3	County Road 19	Ameliasburgh	Rednersville, Centre	
24	County Road 24	County Road 10	Army Reserve Road	Athol	Cherry Valley, Soup Harbour	
25	County Road 25	County Road 7	County Road 8	North Marysburgh	none	Minor connecting route
27	North Beach Road	North Beach	Loyalist Parkway	Hillier	North Beach Provincial Park	
28	County Road 28	County Road 3	King's Highway 62	Ameliasburgh	Rossmore, Fenwood Gardens	
29	Mill Street	Loyalist Parkway	Loyalist Parkway	Ameliasburgh, Hillier	Consecon	
30	Corey Street	County Road 1	Loyalist Parkway	Hallowell	Bloomfield	
32	County Road 32	Loyalist Parkway	County Road 12	Hallowell	none	Minor connecting route extending south of Mallory Road
33	Loyalist Parkway, Highway 33	Northumberland County Road 64	Glenora Ferry	Ameliasburgh, Hillier, Hallowell, North Marysburgh	Carrying Place, Consecon, Wellington, Bloomfield, Picton, Glenora	Extension of Hastings County Road 33 from Stirling; Loyalist Parkway continues from Hwy. 62 junction as Loyalist Parkway; known as Main Street in Wellington and Wellington Street in Bloomfield; Known as Main Street (West of 49) and Bridge Street (East of 49) in Picton
34	County Road 34	County Road 4	County Road 5	Hallowell	Yerexville	Hull Road extends west to May Road
35	County Road 35	County Road 15	County Road 49	Sophiasburgh	Greenpoint, Cole Wharf, Roblin Mills	
38	County Road 38	County Road 8	Waupoos Marina	North Marysburgh	Waupoos	Length of road approx. 550 m (600 yd)
39	Stinson Block Road	Edward Drive	County Road 29	Hillier	Consecon, Wellers Bay	Stinson Block Road loops back to County Road 29
49	Highway 49	County Road 35	Loyalist Parkway	Hallowell, Sophiasburgh	Picton, Fawcettville, Woodville, Roblin Mills	Picton Main Street continues west on Loyalist Parkway to Lake Street; road continues north as King's Highway 49 on bridge over Bay of Quinte to Tyendinaga Mohawk Territory, Hastings County Road 15, and Highway 401 at exit 566
