= Foxboro, Ontario =

Coordinates: 44°14′46″N 77°26′04″W

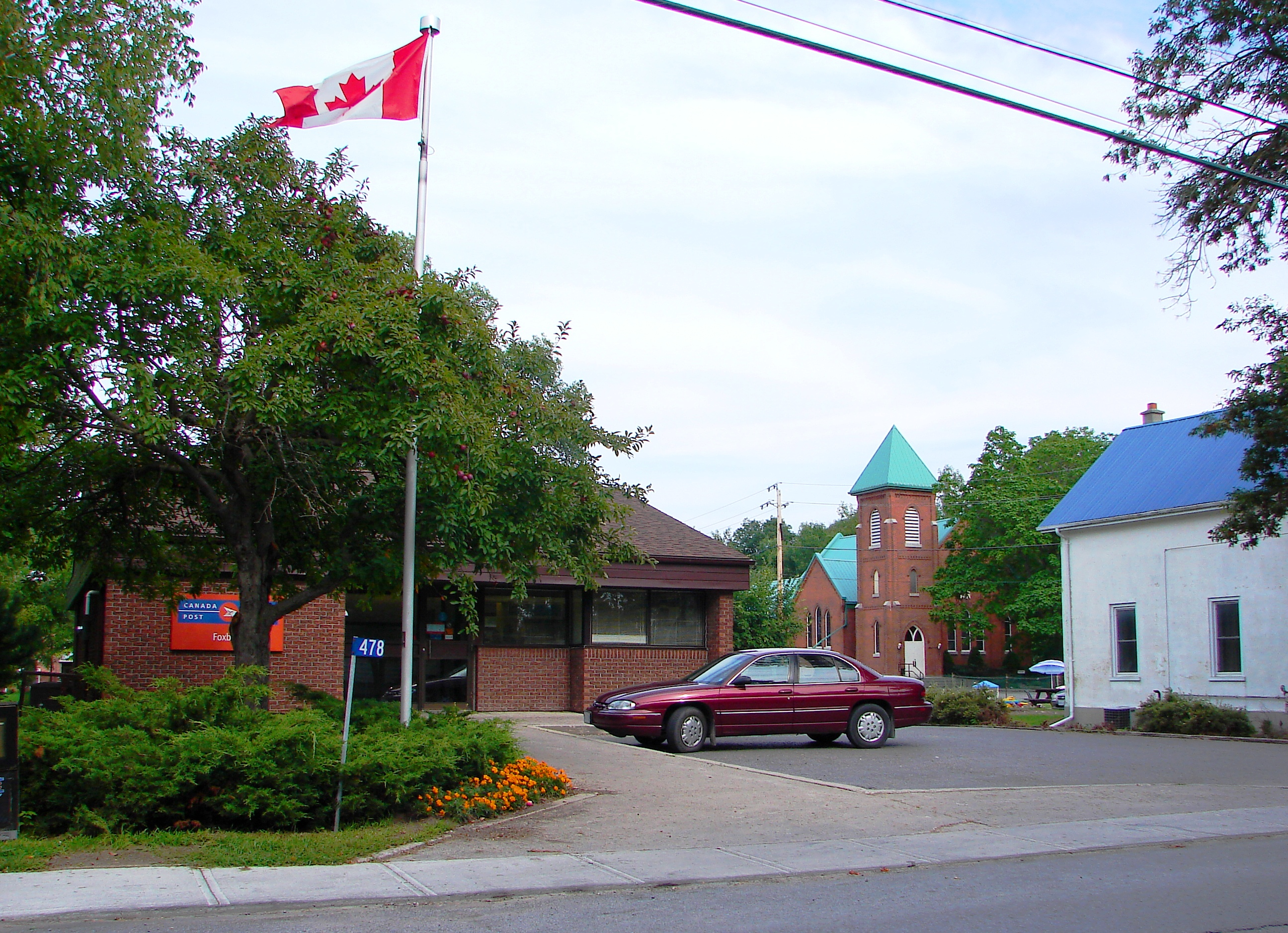
Foxboro Post Office and church

Foxboro is a community located in southern Ontario, 10 kilometres (6.2 mi) north of the centre of Belleville. It is just east of Highway 62 linking Belleville with Bancroft, and it has also direct road connections to and from Frankford, Stirling, and Plainfield via Mudcat Road. The Moira River runs just east of the community. The village of Foxboro is a part of the City of Belleville and the Mayor is Neil Ellis.

== Nearest places ==
- Stirling, northwest (distance: 12 km)
- Plainfield, northeast (distance: about 6 km)
- Belleville, south (distance: 10 km from the centre)
- Frankford, west (distance: about 23 km)

== Geography and information ==
The area around Foxboro is made up of hills, farmlands, and forests within the valley and hilly areas. The main industries until the mid-20th century were agriculture and cheese making. The downtown section features a few shops on Ashley Street (formerly Main Street) where Highways 14 and 62 used to pass, as well as on North Main Street and Old Madoc Road. The village was originally called Smithville, after its founder Smith Demorest, who built a modern clapboard house in 1810 on the Fifth Concession. The house still stands today at the corner of Main St. and the Fifth Concession.

== Other ==
Foxboro features a school, churches, a few car mechanics, an architectural woodshop, a convenience store as well as a Foodland, banks (ATM only), and several parks.

== See also ==
- List of communities in Ontario
