= List of numbered roads in Hastings County =

This is a list of numbered municipal roads in Quinte West, Belleville and Hastings County, Ontario.

The City of Quinte West and the City of Belleville are single-tier municipalities not under the jurisdiction of an upper-tier municipality such as Hastings County and thus, are outside of the geographic limits of Hastings County for municipal purposes. For geographic purposes however, Quinte West and Belleville are within the geographic limits of Hastings County. The cities form part of the county's census division.

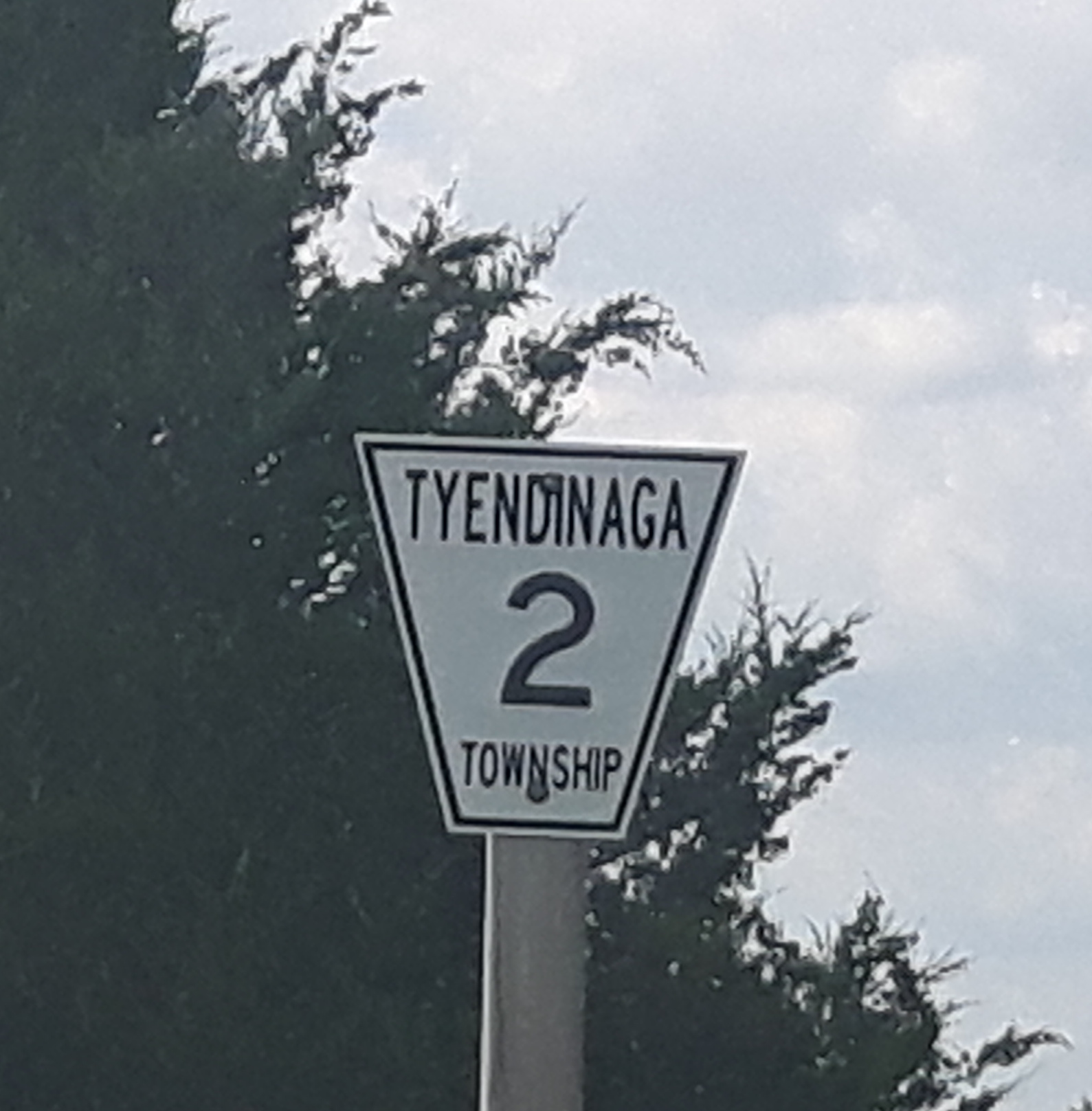
Shield for Tyendinaga Township Road 2

Diagram of a shield for Wollaston Township Road 620

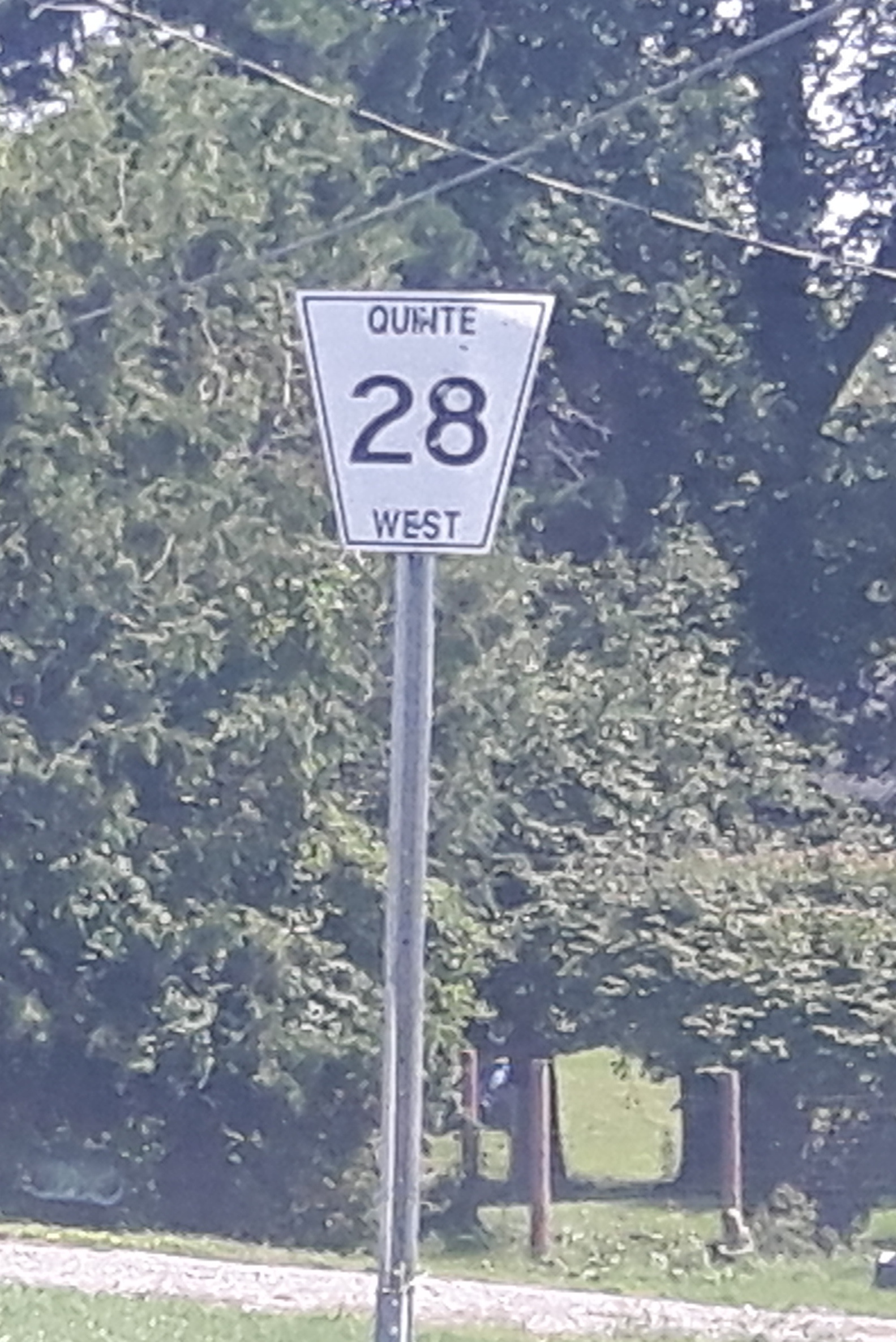
Shield for Quinte West Road 28

== List ==
Municipal Road #	Local name(s)	Southern/Western Terminus	Northern/Eastern Terminus	Settlements served	Additional Notes
1	Wallbridge-Loyalist Road	County Road 2	County Road 14	Loyalist College	
2	Old Highway 2 Dundas Street	Stoney Point Road	County Road 10	Trenton, Belleville, Milltown, Marysville, Deseronto	Former King's Highway 2; follows King's Highway 49 from Belleville Road to York Road; a.k.a. Dundas Street in Trenton, Dundas Street in Belleville and Dundas Street in Deseronto
4	Sidney Street; Glenn Miller Road; Riverside Parkway	Dixon Drive, Trenton	County Road 33	Trenton, Glenn Miller, Frankford	
5	County Road 5 Mill Street; Frankford Road; Ashley Street; Mudcat Road	County Road 28	County Road 41	Wooler, Stockdale, Frankford, Foxboro	
6	Blessington Road; Read Road; Enright Road; Deseronto Road	King's Highway 37	Scott's Mill Road	Blessington, Read, Albert, Ebenezer	
7	Shannonville Road	County Road 2	King's Highway 37	Blessington, Halston, Chisholms Mills, Roslin	
8	Hoards Road; Campbellford Road; Front Street; Mill Street; Ridge Road; Moira Road	Wingfield Road	King's Highway 37	Anson, Stirling, West Huntingdon Station, Moira	
10	Deseronto Road	County Road 2	Kennelly Road	Deseronto	This road is the boundary between Lennox and Hastings counties.
11	Deloro Road	King's Highway 7	King's Highway 62	Deloro, Malone	
12	Cooper Road	King's Highway 7	Bannockburn Road	Hazzards Corners, Rimington, Allen, Cooper	
13	Marlbank Road; Napanee Road	King's Highway 37	Youngs Road	Stoco, Larkins, Farrell Corners, Marlbank	
14	Foxboro-Stirling Road; Forsyth Street; Main Street; Cordova Road	County Road 5	Vansickle Road	Foxboro, Stirling, Bonarlaw, Marmora	
15	Marysville Road; Waddingham Road; Melrose Road	Tyendinaga Mohawk Territory	County Road 6	Lonsdale	Intersects King's Highway 401 at Exit 566; continues as King's Highway 49.
16	Bayshore Road	King's Highway 49	County Road 2	Deseronto	
17	Point Anne Road	Lane Crescent	County Road 2	Point Anne	
18	Airport Parkway	College Street East, Belleville	County Road 7	Belleville, Belleville Airport	
19	Wellmans Road	County Road 8	County Road 14	Wellman	
20	Queensborough Road	County Road 12	King's Highway 7	Hazzards Corners, Queensborough	
21	RCAF Road	County Road 2	County Road 22	CFB Trenton	
22	Hamilton Road	County Road 4	County Road 1	Trenton	
23	St. Lawrence Street	King's Highway 7	King's Highway 7	Madoc	
24	Belleville Road	King's Highway 49	County Road 10	Marysville	
25	Flinton Road	King's Highway 7	Lennox and Addington County limits	Elzevir	
26	Moneymore Road	County Road 7	County Road 32	Chisholms Mills, Moneymore, Coulters Hill	
27	Maitland Drive; Cannifton Road; Tank Farm Road	County Road 30	King's Highway 37	Cannifton	
28	New Wooler Road	Dalmas Road	County Road 40	none	minor rural route
30	Sidney Street	County Road 2	County Road 31	Belleville	
31	Vermilyea Road	County Road 1	King's Highway 62	none	minor connecting route
32	Napanee Road	County Road 3	Cold Water Road	Marlbank	
33	Loyalist Parkway; Carrying Place Road; Dufferin Avenue; Dundas Street West; Division Street; Front Street; Water Street; Trenton Street; Trenton-Frankford Road; Trent Street; Mill Street; River Drive; Frankford-Stirling Road	Old Portage Road (continues as Prince Edward County Road 33)	County Road 8	Trenton, Frankford, River Valley, Stirling	Formerly part of King's Highway 33
38	Spring Brook Road; Crookston Road	Rylstone Road	King's Highway 37	Spring Brook, Crookston, Tweed	
39	Sulphide Road	King's Highway 37	Otter Creek Road	Cosy Cove, Sulphide	
40	County Road 40; Wooler Road	County Road 33	County Road 28	Highway 401 Exit 522	
41	Phillipston Road	King's Highway 37	County Road 8	Phillipston, Moira	
62	Peterson Colonization Road	King's Highway 62	Schweig Road (continues as Renfrew County Road 62)	Maynooth, Maple Leaf, Purdy	Formerly part of King's Highway 62
69	Kamaniskeg Lake Road; Siberia Road	District Road 62	Renfrew County limits	none	minor bush route
504	Highway 504	Peterborough County Road 504	Wollaston Township Road 620	none	Formerly Secondary Highway 504
517	Highway 517	Boulter Road	Coulas Road	Craigmont	
620	Highway 620	Peterborough County Road 620	King's Highway 62	Coe Hill, Ormsby	Formerly Secondary Highway 620
