= Bloomfield, Ontario =

Unincorporated community in Ontario, Canada

Bloomfield
- Settlement
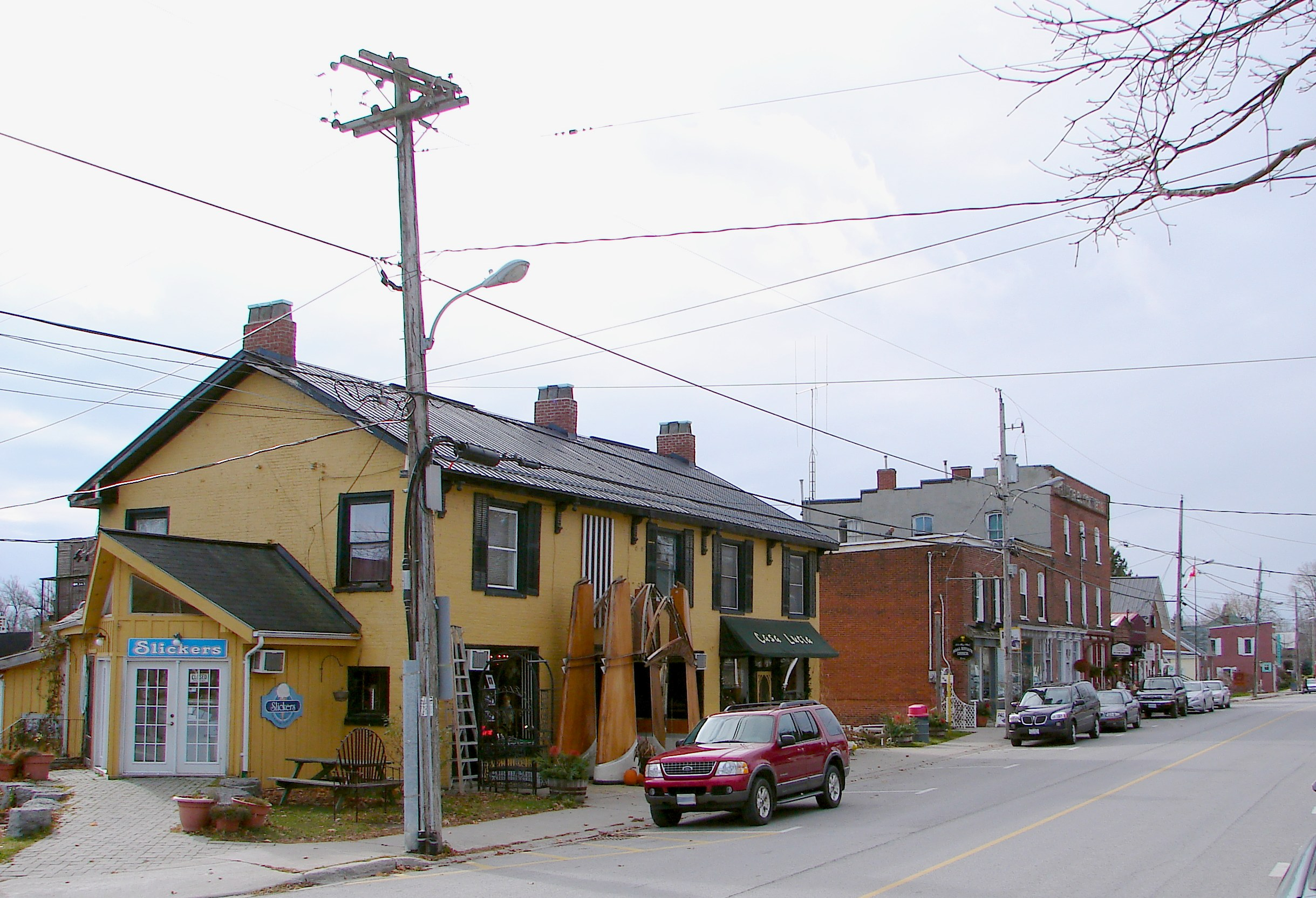
- Bloomfield, Prince Edward County, Ontario, Canada

- Location within Ontario
- Coordinates: 43°59′11.01″N 77°13′48.19″W
- Country: Canada
- Province: Ontario
- County: Prince Edward County
- Elevation: 84 m (276 ft)

Population (2021)
  - Total: 477
  - Density: 232.7/km^{2} (603/sq mi)
- Time zone: UTC-05:00 (EST)
  - Summer (DST): UTC-04:00 (EDT)
- Postal code: K0K 0C9, K0K 1G0
- Area codes: 343, 613

Bloomfield is an unincorporated community in Ontario, Canada. It is recognized as a designated place by Statistics Canada.

== Demographics ==
In the 2021 Census of Population conducted by Statistics Canada, Bloomfield had a population of 477 living in 202 of its 245 total private dwellings, a change of −17.2% from its 2016 population of 576. With a land area of 2.05 km^{2} (0.79 sq mi), it had a population density of 232.7/km^{2} (602.6/sq mi) in 2021.

== See also ==
- List of communities in Ontario
- List of designated places in Ontario
